= Wessobrunn Prayer =

Old High German prayer

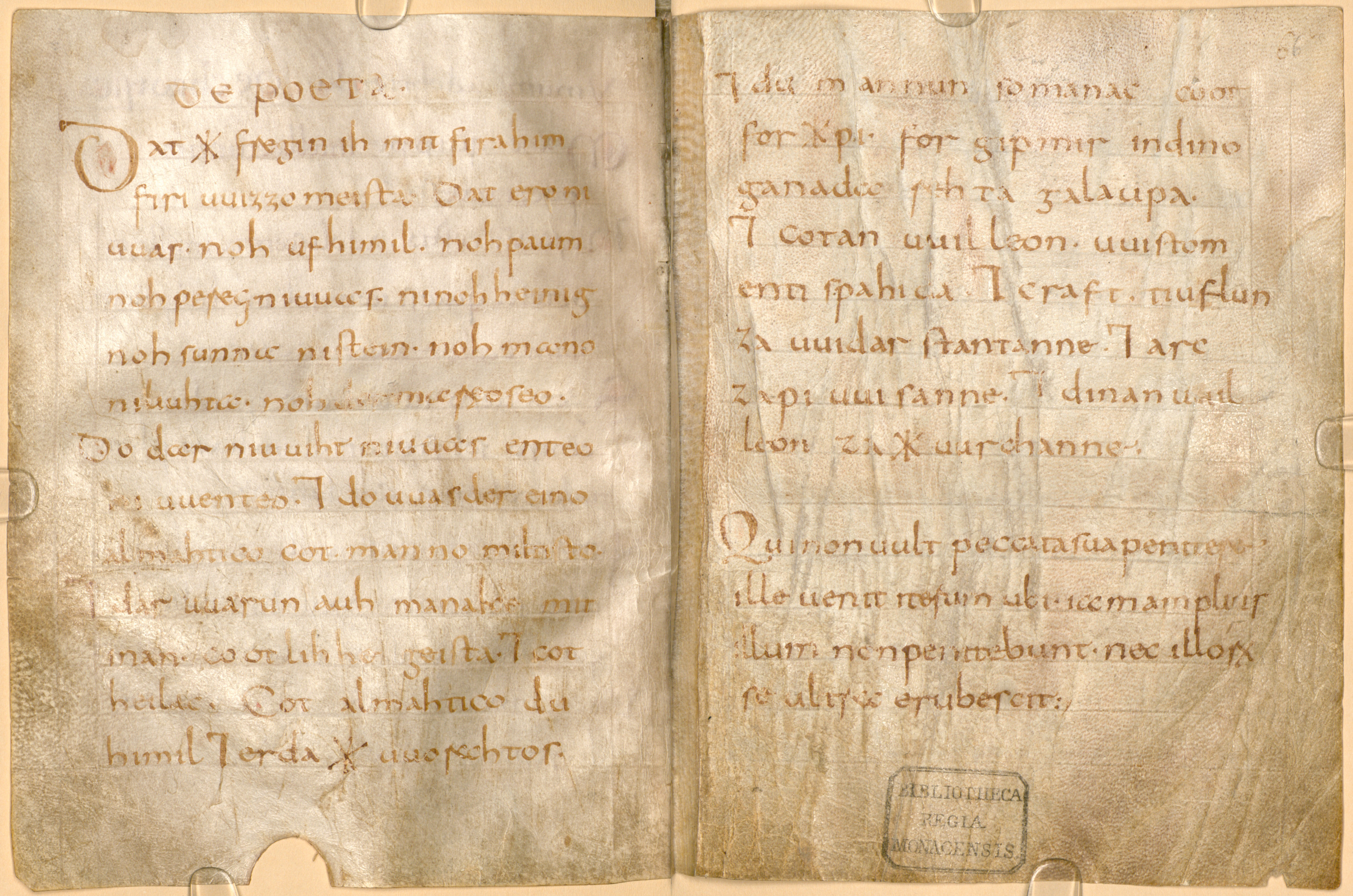
The Wessobrunner Gebet in Clm 22053

The Wessobrunn Prayer (German: Wessobrunner Gebet, also Wessobrunner Schöpfungsgedicht, "Wessobrunn Creation Poem") is among the earliest known poetic works in Old High German, believed to date from the end of the 8th century.

== Provenance and reception ==
The poem is named after Wessobrunn Abbey, a Benedictine monastery in Bavaria, where the sole manuscript containing the text was formerly kept. The abbey was dissolved in 1803 and its library incorporated into the Bavarian Royal Library in Munich, where the manuscript was given the identifier "Clm 22053". The script of the Latin title is uncial, that of the text Caroline minuscule. Paleographic characteristics of the script support production in Bavaria, with some Swabian influence, consistent with an origin in southern Bavaria, likely in the Diocese of Augsburg. The manuscript was probably not written at Wessobrunn, however (the original monastery at Wessobrunn having been destroyed in a Magyar raid in 955). Suggestions for the origin of the manuscript include Regensburg, Benediktbeuern, Staffelsee and Augsburg itself.

The manuscript is a convolution of five parts, with a total of 98 folia (numbered to 99, fol. 8 missing). The poem is contained at the end of the second fascicle (foll. 22-66), on foll. 65v/66r, following a collection of Latin excerpts on theology, geography and metrology. The date of composition is put in the reign of Charlemagne, roughly in the 790s (estimates range from "shortly after 772" to "shortly after 800"). The manuscript itself was written in the early 800s, most likely the years just predating 814.

The language has some Bavarian characteristics (cootlîh, paum, pereg) besides traces of Low German or Anglo-Saxon influence, specifically in the first line (dat is Low German; gafregin ih parallels OS gifragn ik and AS ȝefraeȝn ic). Anglo-Saxon influence is further suggested by the scribe's representation of the word enti "and" (with one exception) by Tironian et (⁊), and by the use of a "star-rune" ᚷ⃒ (a bindrune combining g and i) to represent the syllable ga- shared by only one other manuscript, also Bavarian, viz., Arundel MS 393 in the British Library. This rune is analogous to the gilch rune in the so-called "Marcomannic runes" of Hrabanus Maurus (De Inventione Litterarum); also comparable in shape is the Old English io rune (ᛡ) and the Younger Futhark h rune (ᚼ). Perrett (1938) went as far as attempting the reconstruction of an Anglo-Saxon original of the poem.

The text was printed, without attempts at an interpretation, by Bernhard Pez in 1721, again in Monumenta Boica in 1767, under the title De Poeta * Kazungali, and again by Johann Wilhelm Petersen, Veränderungen und Epochen der deutschen Hauptsprache (1787).

The first edition of the text with philological commentary and translation is due to F. D. Gräter (1797). Gräter also included a facsimile of a copy by Wessobrunn librarian Anselm Ellinger (1758–1816). Gräter's edition was improved upon by the Brothers Grimm in 1812.

The word Kazungali printed in the 1767 transcription was interpreted as the name of the poem's author, but this was recognized as mistaken by Docen (1809). Rather, the word kazungali (equivalent to modern German Gezüngel) is a gloss for "poetry". It is not found on the page of the poem, but four pages earlier (fol. 63r), where [ars] poetica is glossed with "ᚷ̶ kazungali" (with an "asterisk" symbol reminiscent of the "star-rune" but with horizontal bar). The editors of Mon. Boi. were thus inspired to transfer the Old High German gloss for "poetry" to the poem's Latin header.

== Text ==
The poem is in two sections: the first is a praise of creation in nine lines of alliterative verse. This is followed by a prayer in prose: Grimm (1812) and Massmann (1824) made attempts at the reconstruction of alliterating verses in the second part, but following Wilhelm Wackernagel (1827:9), the second part is now mostly thought to be intended as prose with occasional alliteration.

Some features in the first section reflect the language and idiom of Germanic epic poetry, using alliteration and poetic formulae known from the Norse, Anglo-Saxon and Old Saxon traditions (ero ... noh ufhimil, manno miltisto, dat gafregin ih).

The cosmological passages in the poem have frequently been compared to similar material in the Völuspá, and in the Rigvedic Nasadiya Sukta. Against this, Wackernagel (1827:17ff) holds that the emphasis of a creatio ex nihilo is genuinely Christian and not found in ancient cosmogonies.

[65v]

5

10

[66r]
15

20

Close transcription

De poeta.
Dat ᚷ⃒ fregin ih mit firahim
firi uuizzo meiſta. Dat ero ni
uuaſ· noh ufhimil. noh paum
noh perecniuuaſ. ninohheinig
noh ſunna niſtein· noh mano
niliuhta. noh der maręoſeo.
Do dar niuuiht niuuaſ enteo
ni uuenteo. ⁊ do uuaſ der eino
al mahtico cot manno miltiſto.
⁊ dar uuarun auh manake mit
inan: cootlihhe geiſta. ⁊ cot
heilac. Cot almahtico· du himil
⁊ erda ᚷ⃒ uuorahtoſ.
⁊ du mannun ſomanac coot
forᚷ⃒pi· for gipmir indina
ganada rehta galaupa:
⁊ cotan uuilleon· uuiſtóm·
enti ſpahida. ⁊ craft· tiuflun
za uuidar ſtantanne. ⁊ arc
zapi uuiſanne. ⁊ dinan uuil
leon za ᚷ⃒ uurchanne:

Normalized text

De poeta
Dat gafregin ih mit firahim firiuuizzô meista,
Dat ero ni uuas noh ûfhimil
noh paum noh pereg ni uuas
ni [sterro] nohheinîg noh sunna ni scein
noh mâno ni liuhta noh der mareo-sêo.
Dô dar niuuiht ni uuas enteô ni uuenteô,
enti dô uuas der eino almahtîco cot, manno miltisto,
enti (dar uuârun auh) manakê mit inan cootlîhhê geistâ.

Enti cot heilac, cot almahtîco, dû himil enti erda gauuorahtôs, enti dû mannun sô manac coot forgâpi,
forgip mir in dînô ganâdâ rehta galaupa enti côtan uuilleon uuîstôm enti spâhida, [tugida] enti craft tiuflun za uuidar stantanne enti arc za piuuîsanne enti dînan uuilleon za gauurchanne.

English translation

This I found, from men, as the foremost wisdom,
That neither earth there was, nor sky above;
Nor tree, nor hill there was.
Nor stars there were; nor shone the sun.
Nor moon-light there was, nor the salty sea.
Nothing there was: neither end, nor limit.
And there was the One Almighty God,
The mildest of men; and many were with them,
Godly Ghosts: and God the Holy.

God Almighty! Thou wroughtest Heaven and Earth; And to men Thou gavest so much good. Give me the right belief in Thy grace; And a good will, wisdom, and also prudence; Virtue wherewith to withstand the Devils, to drive away Evil, and to work Thy will.

Grimm (1812) and Massmann (1824) agree in the analysis of the first six verses, as shown above. They differ in their analysis of verses seven to nine, and they attempt to restitute an alliterative structure in the "prose" portion (for a total of 15 and 17 verses, respectively), as follows:

Grimm (1812)

enti do was der eino almahtico cot,
manno miltisto, enti manake mit imo,
cootlihhe geista, enti cot heilac.
cot almahtico, du himil enti erda chiworahtos, [10]
enti du mannun so manac coot forchipi,
forgip mir in dinero ganada rehta galaupa
enti cotan willeon, wistom enti spahida,
[tugida] enti craft tiuflun za widar stantanne,
enti arc za piwisanne, enti dînan willeon za chiwurchanne. [15]

Massmann (1824)

enti do uuas der eino almahtico cot,
manno miltisto, enti manake mit-man,
cootlihhe geista; enti cot heilac,
cot almahtico, du himil enti erda chiuuorahtos, [10]
enti du mannun so manac
coot forchipi: forgip mir
in dino ganada rehta galaupa,
enti côtan uuilleon, uuistom enti spahida,
[tugida] enti craft tiuflun [15]
za uuidarstantanne enti arc za piuuisanne,
enti dinan uuilleon za chiuurchanne.

== Musical settings ==
The poem has been set to music many times in the 20th century. Arrangements include those by Heinrich Kaminski as part of the work Triptychon for voice and organ (1931), and by his pupil Carl Orff, published as part of the series Schulwerk (1950–54). Other settings include those by Hans Josef Wedig, op. 11, (Version 1) (1937), for male choir and organ, and a 1951 motet by Leopold Katt (1917–1965), Mir gestand der Sterblichen Staunen als der Wunder grösstes... (a free translation of the opening line based on the translation by Karl Wolfskehl).

One of the most unusual settings is by the German composer Helmut Lachenmann in his Consolation II (1968), in which component phonetic parts of the words of the prayer are vocalised separately by the 16 solo voices in a texture of vocal 'musique concrète'. More recent interpretations by composers in the classical tradition include those by Felix Werder in 1975 for voice and small orchestra, and by Michael Radulescu in two works: De Poëta in 1988 for four choirs and bells, and in another arrangement of 1991 re-worked in 1998 for soprano and organ.

Medieval folk groups have adapted the text, including Estampie in their album Fin Amor (2002), and In Extremo in Mein rasend Herz (2005).

== Bibliography ==
- Steinhoff, H-H, 1999. Wessobrunner Gebet, in: Verfasserlexikon, vol. 10, cols. 961-965.
- Willy Krogmann, "Die Mundart der Wessobrunner Schöpfung", Zeitschrift für Mundartforschung 13 (1937), 129-149.
- Heinrich Tiefenbach, "Wessobrunner Schöpfungsgedicht" in: Heinrich Beck, Dieter Geuenich, Heiko Steuer (eds.), Reallexikon der Germanischen Altertumskunde 33 (2006), 513–516.
- Horst Dieter Schlosser, Althochdeutsche Literatur (1970), p. 28 (online transcription: fh-augsburg.de).
