= Fehu =

Runic alphabet letter

Name	Proto-Germanic	Old English	Old Norse
Name	*Fehu	Feoh	Fé
Name	"livestock → (loose) wealth"		
Shape	Elder Futhark	Futhorc	Younger Futhark
Unicode	ᚠ U+16A0		
Transliteration	f		
Transcription	f		
IPA	[ɸ]	[f]	
Position in rune-row	1		

Fehu is the reconstructed Proto-Germanic name for the rune ᚠ (Old Norse: fé; Old English: feoh), found as the first rune in all futharks (runic alphabets starting with F, U, Þ, Ą, R, K), i.e. the Germanic Elder Futhark, the Anglo-Frisian Futhark and the Norse Younger Futhark, with continued use in the later medieval runes, early modern runes and Dalecarlian runes.

It corresponds to the letter f in the Latin alphabet, but it can periodically shift into the sound value of v (compare "leaf" and "leaves").

== Character ==
The shape of the rune is likely based on Etruscan v ⟨𐌅⟩ ⟨⟩, like Greek Digamma ⟨Ϝ⟩ and Latin ⟨F⟩ ultimately from Phoenician waw ⟨⟩.

The change of the bistaves pointing upward could stem from visually diverging it from the rune ᚨ, as well as linking it visually to the horns of cattle (see § Name).

== Name ==
The root name is an ancient word for "livestock". Compare Swedish: fä ("livestock, animal"), Dutch: vee ("livestock, cattle"), German: Vieh ("livestock"), Old Norse: fé ("livestock, loose assets"), Old English: feoh ("livestock, money"), *fehu ("livestock"), Latin: pecū, pecūs ("livestock"), Sanskrit: पशु (paṧu, "livestock, cattle"). By extension, it also means '(loose) wealth' and thereof, thus surviving as fee in English with the meaning of "payment compensating for rights or services".

The Proto-Germanic name has been reconstructed as *fehu, with the meaning of "livestock, cattle" and by extension "wealth".

The corresponding letter of the Gothic alphabet is ⟨𐍆⟩ ⟨f⟩, called faihu. Such correspondence between all rune poems and the Gothic letter name, as well, is uncommon, and gives the reconstructed name of the Old Futhark a high degree of certainty.

== Rune poems ==
The name is recorded in all three rune poems:

Old Norwegian:

ᚠ Fé vældr frænda róge;
føðesk ulfr í skóge.

Translation:

Fee causes strife amongst kin;
the wolf lives in the forest.

Old Icelandic:

ᚠ Fé er frænda róg · ok flæðar viti
ok grafseiðs gata

Translation:

Fee is strife of kin and beacon of floods (the sea)
and grave-saithe's path (serpent's path).

Old English:

ᚠ Feoh bẏþ frofur · fira gehƿẏlcum;
sceal ðeah manna gehƿẏlc · miclun hẏt dælan
gif he ƿile for drihtne · domes hleotan.

Translation:

Fee is a comfort to every man;
yet must everyone bestow it freely,
if they wish to gain honour in the sight of the Lord.

== See also ==
- Félag
