= Medieval runes =

Scandinavian runic alphabet

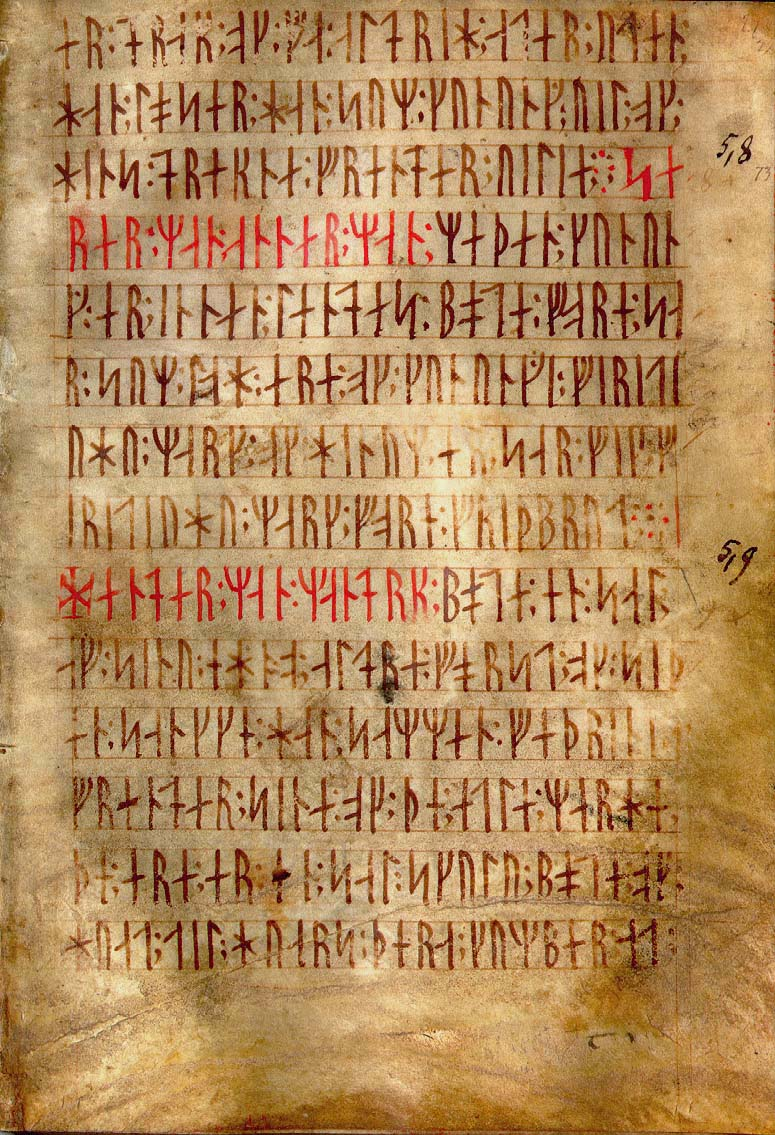
- Leaf (f. 27r.) of Codex Runicus, a vellum manuscript from c. 1300 containing one of the oldest and best preserved texts of the Scanian Law, written entirely in runes
- Script type: alphabet
- Period: 12th to 17th centuries
- Direction: Left-to-right
- Languages: North Germanic languages

Related scripts
- Parent systems: Phoenician alphabet: Greek alphabet (Cumae variant); Old Italic alphabets; Elder Futhark; Younger Futhark; Medieval runes
- Child systems: Dalecarlian runes

The medieval runes, or the futhork, was a Scandinavian runic alphabet that evolved from the Younger Futhark after the introduction of stung (or dotted) runes at the end of the Viking Age. These stung runes were regular runes with the addition of either a dot diacritic or bar diacritic to indicate that the rune stood for one of its secondary sounds (so an i rune could become an e rune or a j rune when stung). The medieval futhork was fully formed in the early 13th century. Due to the expansion of its character inventory, it was essentially possible to have each character in an inscription correspond to only one phoneme, something which was virtually impossible in Younger Futhark with its small inventory of 16 runes.

Medieval runes were in use throughout Scandinavia during the Middle Ages, and provided the basis for runology beginning in the 16th century.

== History ==
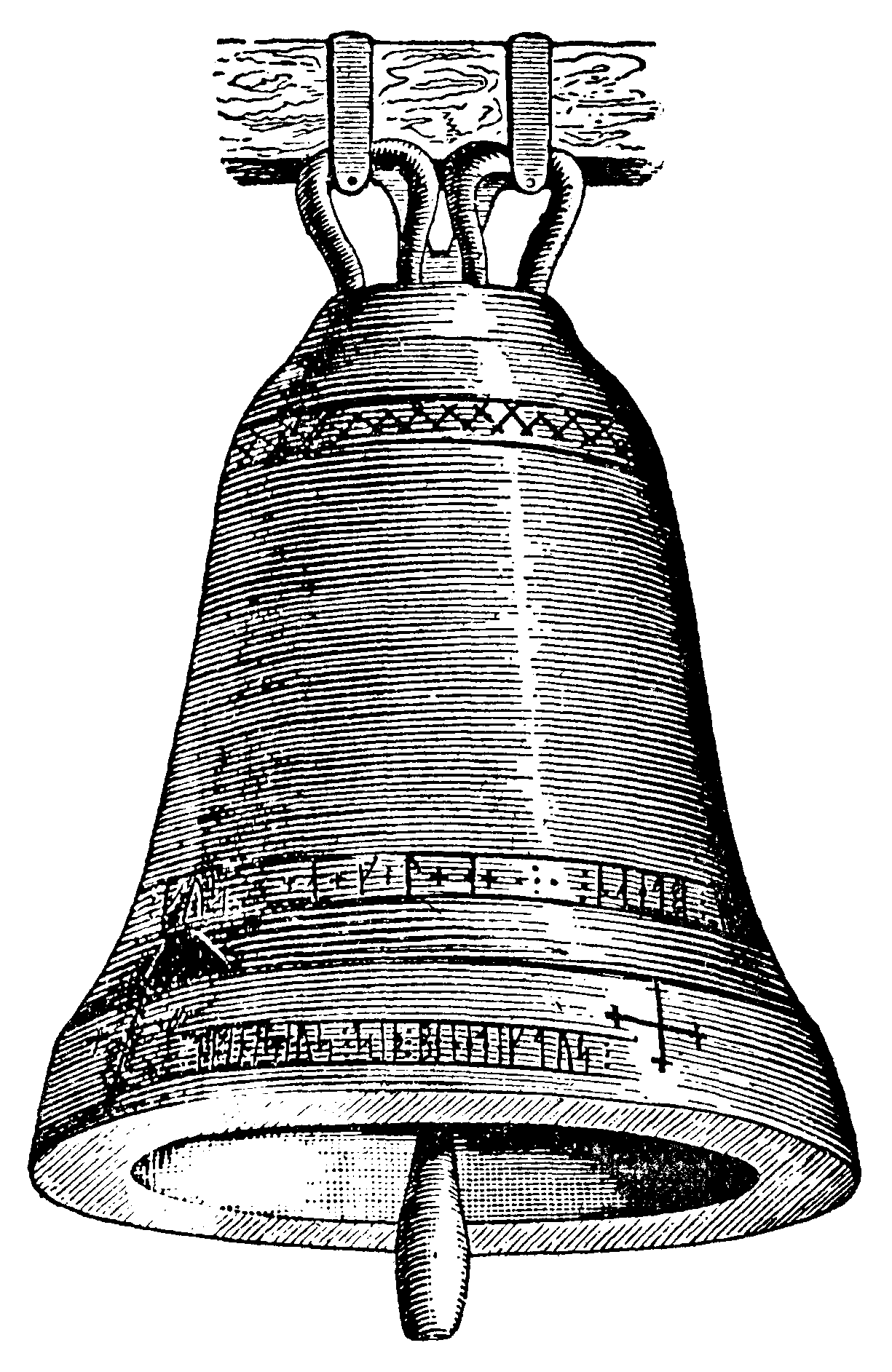
A church bell from Saleby, Västergötland, Sweden, containing a runic inscription from 1228

Towards the end of the 11th century, the runic alphabet met competition from the introduced Latin alphabet, but instead of being replaced, the runes continued to be used for writing in the native Old Norse language. The Latin alphabet, on the other hand, was mainly used by the clergy for writing in Latin, but also Latin prayers could be written down with runes. Whereas the Latin letters were written with quill and ink on expensive parchment, the runes were carved with sharp objects on prepared wooden staffs that were cheaper (see e.g. the Bryggen inscriptions).

Although, it may at first appear that the church did not provide a congenial environment for tradition of writing in medieval runes, there are many known church objects that were engraved with runes, such as reliquaries, bells, baptismal fonts, iron work on church doors, church porches and church walls. In fact, one of the last runestones was raised in memory of the archbishop Absalon (d. 1201).

Most of the runes in the medieval runic alphabet can be traced back to forms in the Younger Futhark as the runemasters preferred to use, or modify, old runes for new phonemes rather than invent new runes.

At the end of the 10th century, or the early 11th century, three stung runes were added in order to represent the phonemes in a more exact manner. Rather than create new runes for the /e/, /ɡ/ and /y/ phonemes, stings were added to the i, k and u runes.

Around the mid-11th century, the ą and the ʀ runes took on new sounds. In Western Scandinavia, the sound of the ʀ rune merged with the sound of the r rune. Since the ʀ rune's name was ýr, and since this name began with /y/, it was no stretch to begin using the rune to stand for /y/. The practice of using the ʀ rune to stand for /y/ then spread to the rest of Scandinavia. Meanwhile, when the nasal /ɑ̃/ changed into /o/, this became the new phoneme for the ą rune.

Towards the end of the 11th century and in the early 12th century, new d and p runes were created through the addition of stings to the t and b runes. A second /p/ rune with a shape similar to an uppercase K, and transliterated as ᴘ, begins to appear around the 13th century. This rune may have been invented because stinging a consonant rune usually marks it as voiced, and the stung b rune violated this norm by being unvoiced.

When the medieval runic alphabet was fully developed in the early 13th century, it mixed short-twig and long-branch runes in a novel manner. The short-twig a rune represented /a/, while the long-branch one represented /æ/. The short-twig ą rune represented /o/, whereas the long-branch form represented /ø/.

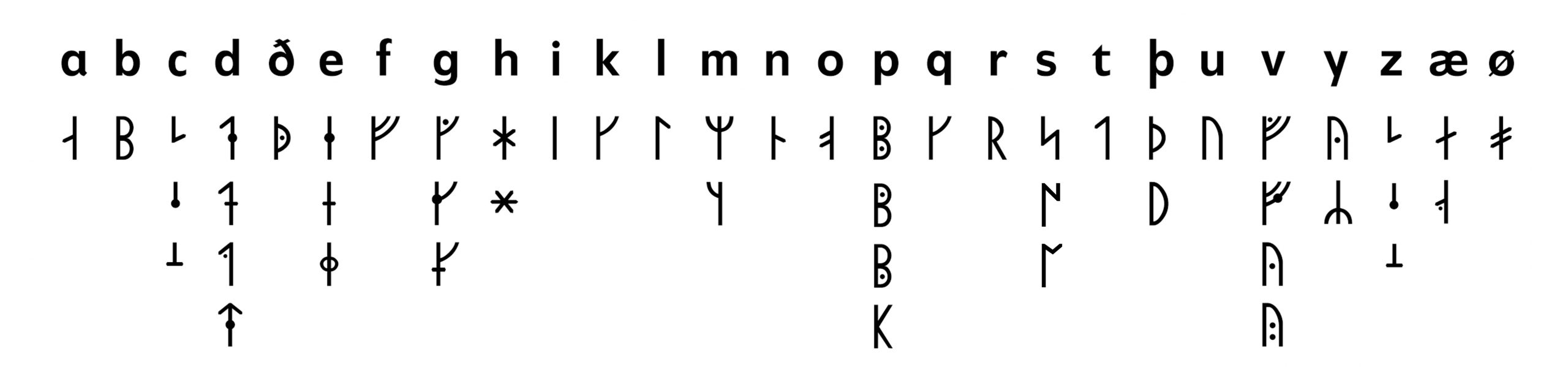
Medieval rune-variations in ABC-order. More variations exist.

As the two alphabets were used alongside each other, there was a mutual influence. The Latin alphabet early borrowed the þ rune to represent the /θ/ and /ð/ phonemes, but in Denmark it was rarely used. In the 15th century, Norwegians and Swedes also stopped using the þ letter, but the Icelanders still retain it in their Latin alphabet. Due to the Latin alphabet the m and the l runes changed places so the rune row read fuþorkniastblmy (note that the last rune had come to represent the /y/ phoneme). In addition, Scandinavians began to double spell runes for consonants, influenced by this use in the Latin alphabet.

In the oldest Scandinavian manuscripts that were written with Latin letters, the m rune was used as a conceptual rune meaning "man". This suggests that the medieval Scandinavian scribes had a widespread familiarity with the names and the meanings of the individual runes. In the oldest preserved manuscript of the Poetic Edda from 1270, and which is written with the Latin alphabet, the m is used as a conceptual rune meaning "man" and in Hávamál it appears 43 times.

In the early 13th century, the runes began to be threatened by the Latin letters as the medieval Scandinavian laws were written. Until then, the laws had been memorized and recited by the lawspeakers. Still, when the runes began to experience competition, they went through a renaissance. A thorough reformation of the runes appeared and the medieval runes reached their most complete form. This may be because the laws were written down, and the oldest manuscript with a Scandinavian law, the Codex Runicus, was written entirely in runes.

== Early modern legacy ==
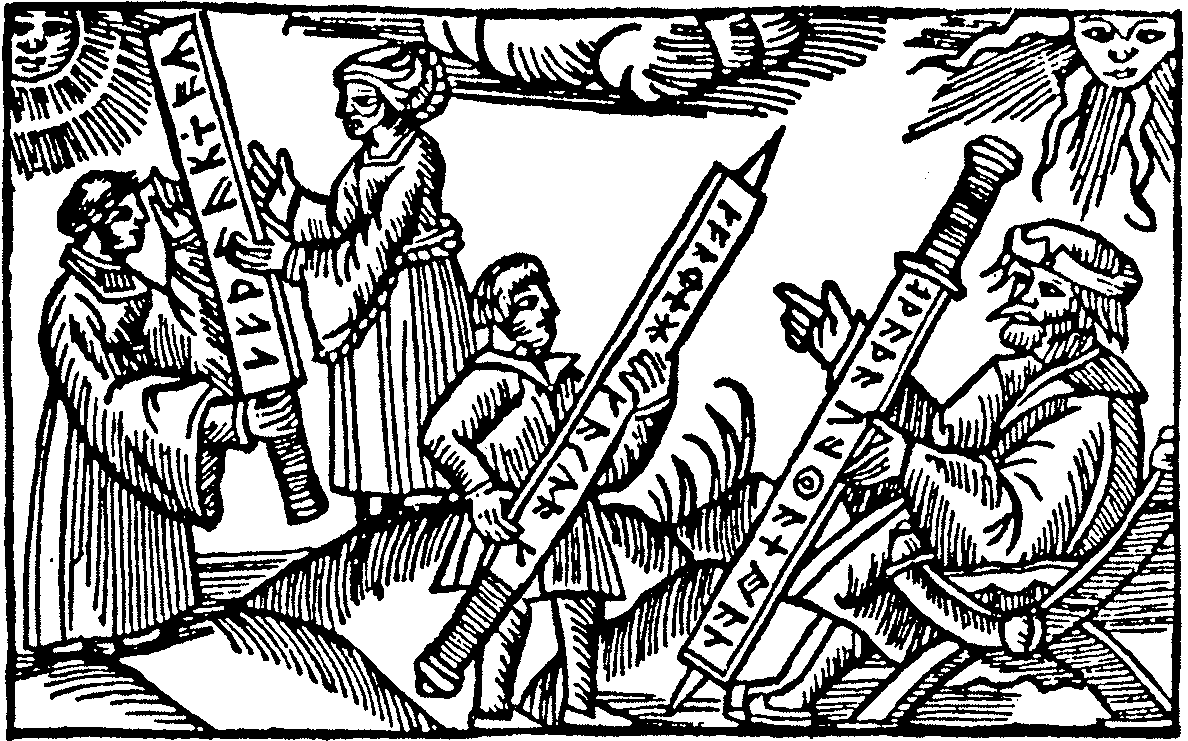
A 16th-century depiction of children taught to use runic calendars (Olaus Magnus)

The Latin letters were introduced officially during the 13th century, but farmers, artisans and traders continued to write with runes to communicate or to mark goods. It appears that in many parts of Sweden, people considered Latin letters to be a foreign practice throughout the Middle Ages. Still in the 16th century, the runes were engraved on official memorials or as secret writing in diaries. In the mid-16th century, the parson of the parish of Runsten on Öland wrote a sign on the chancel-wall of the church that said "The pastor of the parish should know how to read runes and write them". It is likely that the text represented the general opinion of the parishioners. Since the runes were still actively known and used in the 16th century, when the first runologists began to do scholarly work on the runes, the runic tradition never died out. Many manuscripts written in Iceland through the 16th to 19th centuries featured medieval runes, Rune Poems and secret rune sets.

When Linnaeus visited the province Dalarna in 1734, he noted the common use of runes, and this province has been called "the last stronghold of the Germanic script". In Dalarna as in the rest of Sweden, the medieval tradition of using runic calendars was almost universal until the 19th century. A notable case of a runic calendar is the calendar from Gammalsvenskby in Ukraine. It was made on Dagö in 1766 before the Swedish settlement was deported on a forced march to the steppes of Ukraine. For 134 years, the people of Gammalsvenskby in Ukraine used it to calculate the passage of time, until 1900 when a member of the community brought it to Stockholm.

The prominent Swedish runologist Sven B.F. Jansson commented on the use of runes in his country with the following words:

We loyally went on using the script inherited from our forefathers. We clung tenaciously to our runes, longer than any other nation. And thus our incomparable wealth of runic inscriptions also reminds us of how incomparably slow we were – slow and as if reluctant – to join the company of the civilised nations of Europe.

== Letters ==
Shape	Name	Name meaning	Transliteration	IPA
ᚠ	fé	livestock	f	/f/, [v] (allophone of /f/)
ᚢ	úr	windy, cold drizzle/snowfall	u	/u/, /ø/, /v/ ([w] or [v])
ᚦ	þurs	giant, troll	þ	/θ/, [ð] (allophone of /θ/)
ᚮ	óss	Æsir	o	/o/, /ɔ/
ᚱ	reið	riding	r	/r/
ᚴ	kaun	ulcer	k	/k/, /g/, [ɣ] (allophone of /ɡ/)
ᚼ	hagall	hail	h	/h/, rarely [ɣ] (allophone of /h/)
ᚿ	nauð	need	n	/n/
ᛁ	íss	ice	i	/i/, /e/, /j/
ᛆ	ár	year	a	/a/
ᛌ / ᛋ	sól	sun	s	/s/, [z] (allophone of /s/)
ᛐ / ᛏ	týr	Týr	t	/t/, /d/
ᛒ	bjarkan	birch	b	/b/, /p/
ᛘ	maðr	man	m	/m/
ᛚ	lǫgr	water	l	/l/
ᛦ	ýr	yew	y	/y/

The above continues the younger futhark rune order. Although this order was still used in the medieval period, it became increasingly common to arrange the runes in the order of the Latin alphabet. The names listed come from the manuscripts Stowe MS 57, AM 461 12o, and AM 749 4to with slight alteration. The name meanings are inferred from the Norwegian and Icelandic rune poems.

A hallmark of medieval runes was the optional sting or bar diacritic which was often used to indicate when a rune stands for a secondary sound; ᚡ gave /v/, ᚤ gave /y/ and /ø/, ᚧ gave /ð/, ᚵ gave /g/ and /ɣ/, ᛂ gave /e/ and rarely /j/, ᛑ gave /d/, ᛔ gave /p/. Of these, ᚡ and ᚧ were rarer than the other stung runes, and show up later in the timeline.

Other runic characters, such as those in the table below, were also used. ᛕ existed as an alternative to ᛔ. In some cases, short-twig and long-branch variants of the same rune became distinct; ᚯ and ᛅ were often used distinctly from ᚮ and ᛆ. Special runes were sometimes used for Latin words. Three additional stung runes are found on Gotland, though two of them are only attested in one inscription.

Shape	Name	Name meaning	Transliteration	IPA
ᚯ			ø	/ø/, /ɔ/
ᛅ			æ	/ɛ/, /æ/
ᚰ			ǫ	/ɔ/
ᛕ	plástr	plaster	ᴘ	/p/
ᛪ	harðsól	hard-sun / hard-ᛋ (/ks/)	x	transliterates Latin X
ᚶ			ŋ	[ŋg]
ᛀ	stungin nauð	stung need		a variant of /n/?
ᛛ	stunginn lǫgr	stung water		a variant of /l/?

=== Open runes ===
Greenlandic Norse "open" reið (ᚱ)

Some runic symbols involving loops were developed into "open" forms to simplify design. The most prominent of these is plástr (ᛕ), an "open version" of bjarkan (ᛒ) for /p/ (as opposed to the complex stung bjarkan ᛔ).

Greenlandic Norse developed a distinctive "open version" of reið (ᚱ), where the top loop opened up to make two parallel sloping branches, that is found in 14 Greenlandic inscriptions.

== See also ==
- List of runestones
- List of rune-row inscriptions
