= Jēran =

Elder Futhark rune

Name	Proto-Germanic	Old English		Old Norse		
Name	*Jēra-	Ġēr/Ġēar	Īor	Ár		
Name	"season, harvest"	"year, harvest"	"eel"	"harvest, plenty"		
Shape	Elder Futhark	Futhorc		Younger Futhark		
Unicode	ᛃ U+16C3	ᛡ U+16E1 / ᛄ U+16C4	ᛡ U+16E1	ᛡ U+16E1	ᛅ U+16C5	ᛆ U+16C6
Transliteration	j	j	io	ᴀ	a	a
Transcription	j	j	io	a		
IPA	[j]	[j]	[jo]	[a]		
Position in rune-row	12	12	28 or 29	10		

Jera (also Jeran, Jeraz, Yera) is the conventional name of the j-rune ᛃ of the Elder Futhark, from a reconstructed Common Germanic stem *jēra- meaning "harvest, (good) year".

The corresponding letter of the Gothic alphabet is Gothic 𐌾, named 𐌾𐌴𐍂 (jēr), also expressing /j/. The Elder Futhark rune gives rise to the Anglo-Frisian ᛄ /j/, named gēr /jeːr/, and ᛡ /io/, named ior, and to the Younger Futhark ár rune ᛅ, which stands for /a/, as the /j/ phoneme disappears in late Proto-Norse.

Note that ᛆ also can be a variation of dotted Isaz used for /e/; e.g. in Dalecarlian runes.

== Name ==
The reconstructed Common Germanic name *jēran is the origin of English year (Old English ġēar). In contrast to the modern word, it had a meaning of "season" and specifically "harvest", and hence "plenty, prosperity".

The Germanic word is cognate with Greek ὧρος (horos) "year" (and ὥρα (hora) "season", whence hour), Old East Slavic ꙗра (jara) "spring" and with the -or- in Latin hōrnus "of this year" (from *hōjōrō), as well as Avestan 𐬫𐬁𐬭𐬆 (yārə) "year", all from a PIE stem *yer-o-.

== Elder Futhark ==
The derivation of the rune is uncertain; it may have been adapted from the classical Latin alphabet's G, ("C (ᚲ) with stroke"), or it may be a Germanic innovation. The letter in any case appears from the very earliest runic inscriptions, figuring on the Vimose comb inscription, harja.

As the only rune of the Elder Futhark which was not connected, its evolution was the most thorough transformation of all runes, and it was to have numerous graphical variants. In the later period of the Elder Futhark, during the 5th to 6th centuries, connected variants appear, and these are the ones that give rise to the derivations in Anglo-Saxon (as ᛄ ger and ᛡ ior) and Scandinavian (as ᛅ ár) traditions.

== Gothic jer ==
The corresponding Gothic letter is 𐌾 (j), named jēr, which is also based on the shape of the Elder Futhark rune. This is an exception, shared with urus, due to the fact that neither the Latin nor the Greek alphabets at the time of the introduction of the Gothic one had graphemes corresponding to the distinction of j and w from i and u.

== Anglo-Saxon runes ==
The rune in the futhorc is continued as gēr, with its epigraphical variant ᛡ, and its manuscript variant ᛄ (which does appear at least once epigraphically, on the Brandon Pin). Manuscripts also record an ior rune with the shape of ᛡ, but its authenticity is questionable.

== Younger Futhark ==
During the 6th and 7th centuries, the initial j in *jāra was lost in Proto-Norse, which also changed the sound value of the rune from /j/ to an /a/ phoneme. The rune was then written as a vertical staff with a horizontal stroke in the centre, usually transliterated as A, with majuscule, to distinguish it from the ansuz rune, a.

During the last phase of the Elder Futhark, the jēra-rune came to be written as a vertical staff with two slanting strokes in the form of an X in its centre. As the form of the rune had changed considerably, an older 7th century form of the rune was assumed by the s-rune. When the n-rune had stabilized in its form during the 6th and 7th centuries, its vertical stroke slanted towards the right, which made it possible to simplify the jēra-rune by having only one vertical stroke that slanted towards the left, giving the ᛅ ár-rune of the classic Younger Futhark (note however, that the earliest YF inscriptions, such as the Ribe skull fragment, still retain the earlier X-shape). Since a simpler form of the rune was taken by the /a/ phoneme, the older cross form of the rune now came to be used for the /h/ phoneme.

The development of the Jēran rune from the earliest open form was not known before the discovery of the Kylver Stone in 1903, which has an entire elder futhark inscription on it. Therefore, the interpretation of the golden horns of Gallehus was slightly wrong before 1903, as it was believed this rune form could be an early form of the Ingwaz rune. The second word on the horns was thus interpreted as holtingaz rather than holtijaz.

== See also ==
- Elder Futhark
- Rune poem
