= Skåäng Runestone =

Coordinates: 58°57′50.49″N 17°25′53.16″E

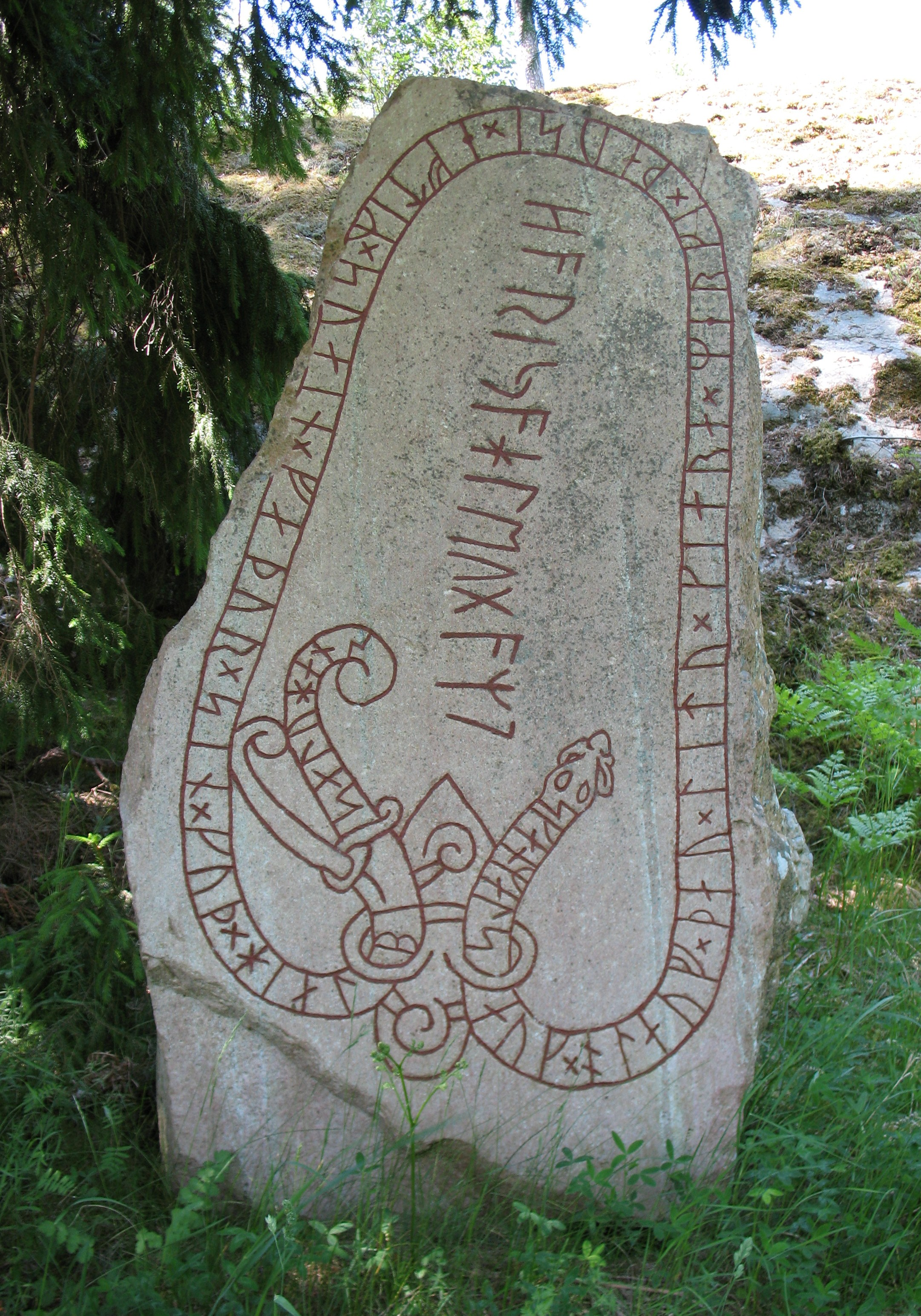
- Writing: Elder Futhark
- Created: 6th Century
- Discovered: 1830; Skåäng, Södermanland, Sweden
- Present location: Skåäng, Södermanland, Sweden
- Culture: Norse
- Rundata ID: Sö 32
- Runemaster: Unknown

Text – Native
- Proto-Norse and Old Norse :See article.

Translation
- See article.

The Skåäng Runestone, designated as Sö 32 under Rundata, is an Iron Age runestone located in Skåäng, Södermanland, Sweden, which is inscribed in Proto-Norse with the elder futhark. During the Viking Age, a second runic inscription was added in Old Norse using the younger futhark.

== Description ==
The Skåäng Runestone consists of a younger futhark inscription that is within a serpent on the edge of the stone and an older inscription in the center of the stone. The younger futhark inscription was discovered in 1830, but the older central inscription was not noticed until 1867.

The Elder Futhark inscription is harija ÷ leugaz which is interpreted as the Proto-Norse names Harija and Leugaz. The name Harija is a hypocoristic form of names ending with -harjaz ("warrior"), or a name beginning with Harja-, and it is part of the place name Häringe. The name Leugaz is a nomen agentis of the same word as the Gothic liugan ("swear an oath") and means "oath taker." Between the two names there is a rune (the shape of younger futhark rune hagall), but there is no consensus on how to interpret it. Two different forms of the z rune algiz are used in this inscription, the first a double or mirrored form similar to that used in the inscription on the Charnay fibula and the second the standard form.

The younger futhark inscription is classified as being carved in runestone style Fp. The text on the serpent states that the stone was part of "landmarks" made by Skammhals and Ólôf in memory of their father Sveinn. The prayer at the end of this text uses the Norse word salu for soul, which was imported from English and is first recorded as being used on a different runestone dating from the tenth century.

== Inscription ==
ᚺᚨᚱᛁᛃᚨᚼ {} ᛚᛖᚢᚷᚨᛉ7
harija ⁓ leugaz
Harja, {} Leugaz
Harja, Leugaz.

ᛋᚴᛅᚾᛘᛅᛚᛋ ᛅᚢᚴ × ᚬᛚᛅᚢᚠ × ᚦᛅᚢ × ᛚᛁᛏᚢ × ᚴᛁᛅᚱᛅ × ᛘᛂᚱᚴᛁ × ᚦᛅᚢᛋᛁ × ᛂᚠᛏᛁᛦ × ᛋᚢᛅᛁᚾ × ᚠᛅᚦᚢᚱ × ᛋᛁᚾ × ᚴᚢᚦ × ᚼᛁᛅᛚᛒᛁ ᛋᛅᛚᚢ ᚼᛅᚾᛋ
skanmals auk × olauf × þau × litu × kiara × merki × þausi × eftiʀ × suain × faþur × sin × kuþ × hialbi salu hans
Skammhals ok {} Ólǫf {} þau {} létu {} gera {} merki {} þessi {} eptir {} Svein, {} fǫður {} sinn. {} Guð {} hjalpi sálu hans.
Skammhals and Ólǫf, they had these landmarks made in memory of Sveinn, their father. May God help his soul.

== See also ==
- List of runestones

== Other sources ==
- The article Skåängstenen in Nordisk familjebok (1917).
- Peterson, Lena (2007). "Lexikon över urnordiska personnamn" (PDF). Swedish Institute for Language and Folklore. Archived from the original (PDF) on 2011-05-18.(Lexicon of Nordic personal names before the 8th century)
