= Caistor-by-Norwich astragalus =

Runic inscription found in Norfolk, England

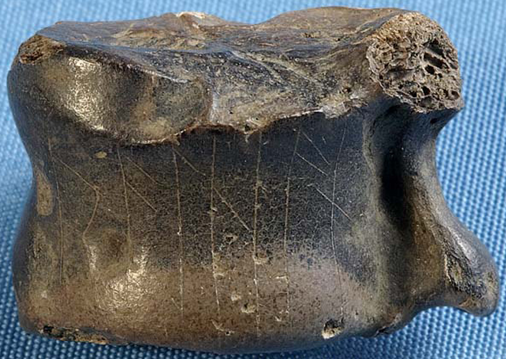
- Material: Bone
- Created: AD 425-475
- Discovered: 1937 in Caistor St. Edmund, Norfolk
- Present location: Norwich Castle Museum
- Registration: N59

The Caistor-by-Norwich astragalus is a roe deer astragalus (ankle bone) found in an urn at Caistor St. Edmund, Norfolk, England in 1937. The astragalus is inscribed with a 5th-century Elder Futhark inscription, reading ᚱᚨᛇᚺᚨᚾ raïhan "roe deer". The inscription is the earliest found in England, and predates the evolution of the specifically Anglo-Frisian Futhorc. As the urn was found in a cemetery that indicated some Scandinavian influence, it has been suggested that the astragalus may be an import, perhaps brought from Denmark in the earliest phase of the Anglo-Saxon settlement of Britain. The inscription is an important testimony for the Eihwaz rune and the treatment of Proto-Germanic *ai. The h rune has the Nordic single-bar shape ᚺ, not the Continental double-bar ᚻ which was later adopted in the Anglo-Frisian runes.
