= Runic (Unicode block) =

- Range: U+16A0..U+16FF (96 code points)
- Plane: BMP
- Scripts: Runic (86 char.); Common (3 char.)
- Major alphabets: Futhark
- Assigned: 89 code points
- Unused: 7 reserved code points

Unicode version history
- 3.0 (1999): 81 (+81)
- 7.0 (2014): 89 (+8)

Unicode documentation
- Code chart ∣ Web page

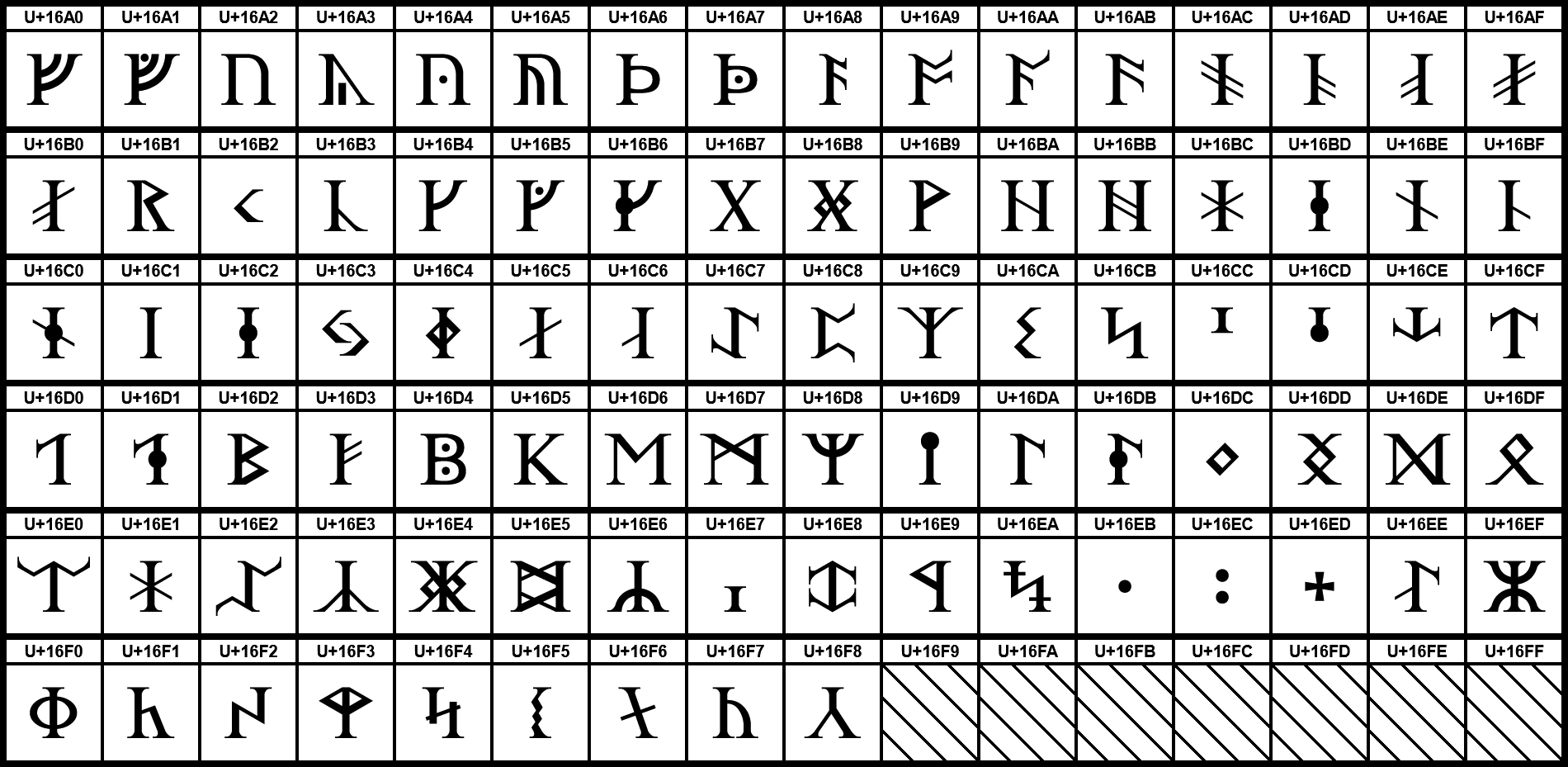
Graphical representation of the Runic Unicode block

Runic is a Unicode block containing runic characters. It was introduced in Unicode 3.0 (1999), with eight additional characters introduced in Unicode 7.0 (2014). The original encoding of runes in UCS was based on the recommendations of the "ISO Runes Project" submitted in 1997. (Note: "At the Third International Symposium on Runes and Runic Inscriptions in Valdres, Norway, in August 1990, the need to represent runes by real graphic symbols in text production of various kinds was discussed. Project meetings were held in Oslo in March 1993 and in Stockholm in November 1994 and March 1995. The proposal from the "ISO Runes Project" (cf. Digitala runor, TemaNord 1997:623, København 1997) was accepted with some minor adjustments in 2001, and Unicode now includes runic characters in accordance with the proposal.")

The block is intended for the representation of text written in Elder Futhark, Anglo-Saxon runes, Younger Futhark (both in the long-branch and short-twig variants), Scandinavian medieval runes and early modern runic calendars; the additions introduced in version 7.0 in addition allow support of the mode of writing Modern English in Anglo-Saxon runes used by J. R. R. Tolkien, (Note: This is not to be confused with Tolkien's own Cirth script which is "runic" in appearance but has no direct relation to the historical runes. This alphabet has no official Unicode encoding (although there is a proposed ConScript Unicode Registry encoding).) and the special vowel signs used in the Franks Casket inscription.

== Background ==
The distinction made by Unicode between character and glyph variant is somewhat problematic in the case of the runes; the reason is the high degree of variation of letter shapes in historical inscriptions, with many "characters" appearing in highly variant shapes, and many specific shapes taking the role of a number of different characters over the period of runic use (roughly the 3rd to 14th centuries AD). The division between Elder Futhark, Younger Futhark and Anglo-Saxon runes are well-established and useful categories, but they are connected by a continuum of gradual development, inscriptions using a mixture of older and newer forms of runes, etc. For this reason, the runic Unicode block is of very limited usefulness in representing of historical inscriptions and is better suited for contemporary runic writing than for palaeographic purposes.

The original publication of the Unicode standard is explicitly aware of these problems, and of the compromises necessary regarding the "character / glyph" dichotomy. The charts published show only "idealized reference glyphs", and explicitly delegates the task of creating useful implementations of the standard to font designers, ideally necessitating a separate font for each historical period. (Note: "The known inscriptions can include considerable variations of shape for a given rune, sometimes to the point where the nonspecialist will mistake the shape for a different rune. There is no dominant main form for some runes, particularly for many runes added in the Anglo-Friesian and medieval Nordic systems. When transcribing a Runic inscription into its Unicode-encoded form, one cannot rely on the idealized representative glyph shape in the character charts alone. One must take into account to which of the four Runic systems an inscription belongs and be knowledgeable about the permitted form variations within each system. The representative glyphs were chosen to provide an image that distinguishes each rune visually from all other runes in the same system. For actual use, it might be advisable to use a separate font for each Runic system.") Glyph shape was taken into consideration explicitly for "unification" of an older rune with one of its descendant characters. (Note: "When a rune in an earlier writing system evolved into several different runes in a later system, the unification of the earlier rune with one of the later runes was based on similarity in graphic form rather than similarity in sound value.") On the other hand, the Younger Futhark era script variants of long-branch, and short-twig, in principle a historical instance of "glyph variants", have been encoded separately, while the further variant form of staveless runes has not. (Note: "Two sharply different graphic forms, the long-branch and the short-twig form, were used for 9 of the 16 Viking Age Nordic runes. Although only one form is used in a given inscription, there are runologically important exceptions. In some cases, the two forms were used to convey different meanings in later use in the medieval system. Therefore the two forms have been separated in the Unicode Standard. ... Staveless runes are a third form of the Viking Age Nordic runes, a kind of Runic shorthand. The number of known inscriptions is small and the graphic forms of many of the runes show great variability between inscriptions. For this reason, staveless runes have been unified with the corresponding Viking Age Nordic runes.")

The ISO Runes Project treated the runes as essentially glyph variants of the Latin script. Everson argued that the native futhark ordering is well established, and that it is unusual for UCS to order letters not in Latin alphabetical order rather than according to native tradition, and a corresponding sorting order of the runic letter Unicode characters was adopted for ISO/IEC 14651 in 2001. (Note: "On 2000-12-24 Olle Järnefors published on behalf of the ISORUNES Project in Sweden a proposal for ordering the Runes in the Common Tailorable Template (CTT) of ISO/IEC 14651. In my view this ordering is unsuitable for the CTT for a number of reasons." "Due to the summer holidays, one of our experts was unable to report back to us by the due date of 2001-09-01. While we voted positively on 2001-08-30, Ireland would like to change our vote to DISAPPROVAL, with the following technical comment: In the tailorable template, the Runic script is ordered according to Latin transliteration order. This produces ordering which does not fully satisfy any user community. The Runes should be reordered to the Futhark order in the tailorable template. Note that the SC22/WG20 minutes are ambiguous as to what should have been sent out for ballot: 'Runes were added after 14651 cut-off. Order of the Runes in N833 are according to the preference of the ISO Runes project (Sweden). Other people, such as Everson and Ken, disagree with the ISO project and prefer the current usage on the web. Reason: academic work is done in transliterations and the order is for the transliterated characters. Everson's proposal is very close to the binary order in 10646 (Futhark) for all extensions in various countries. Transliterated order would have to be a tailoring. Current draft table shows the ISO Runes order.... Discussion about the merits of either ordering. Decision that the order stays as in the table which is the Futhark order.' [...] We believe that ambiguities in transliteration ordering will mean that researchers in the Nordic countries and Britain and Ireland will have to tailor ANYWAY to get a correct transliteration ordering. Therefore the not-quite-perfect transliteration order in the tailorable template serves little purpose. On the other hand, the many non-researcher users of the Runes (who far outnumber the researchers), universally prefer the Futhark order, and require no tailoring for it. Since MOST users will not need to tailor, it seems only logical that the Futhark order should be the order used in the template.")

== Characters ==
The original 81 characters adopted for Unicode 3.0 included 75 letters, three punctuation marks and three "runic symbols".

The names given to the runic letter characters are "a bit clumsy" in a deliberate compromise between scholarly and amateur requirements. They list simplified (ASCII) representations of the three names of a "unified" rune in the Elder Futhark, the Anglo-Saxon and the Younger Futhark traditions, followed by the letter transliterating the rune (if applicable). (Note: "The names given to the Runes in the UCS may be a bit clumsy, but they are intended to serve the needs of scholars and amateurs alike; not everyone is familiar with Runic transliteration practices, and not everyone is conversant with the traditional names in Germanic, English, and Scandinavian usage. So the names concatenate those three together with the scholarly transliteration letter.") The ordering follows the basic futhark sequence, but with (non-unified) variants inserted after the standard Elder Futhark form of each letter, as follows:

Code point	Rune	Name	Elder Futhark	Anglo-Saxon	Younger Futhark (long-branch)	Younger Futhark (short-twig)	Medieval	Dalecarlian
16A0	ᚠ	FEHU FEOH FE F	Yes	Yes	Yes	Yes	Yes	Yes
16A1	ᚡ	V					Yes	
16A2	ᚢ	URUZ UR U	Yes	Yes	Yes	Yes	Yes	Yes
16A3	ᚣ	YR		Yes				
16A4	ᚤ	Y					Yes	
16A5	ᚥ	W					Yes (Note: Modern innovation, intended as representing the Latin letter W in the context of medieval runic inscriptions.)	
16A6	ᚦ	THURISAZ THURS THORN	Yes	Yes	Yes	Yes	Yes	Yes
16A7	ᚧ	ETH					Yes	
16A8	ᚨ	ANSUZ A	Yes	Yes (Note: The Anglo-Saxon æsc rune with the same shape is encoded separately, as 16AB.)				
16A9	ᚩ	OS O		Yes				
16AA	ᚪ	AC A		Yes				
16AB	ᚫ	AESC		Yes				
16AC	ᚬ	LONG-BRANCH-OSS O			Yes			
16AD	ᚭ	SHORT-TWIG-OSS O				Yes		
16AE	ᚮ	O					Yes	
16AF	ᚯ	OE					Yes	Yes
16B0	ᚰ	ON					Yes (Note: nasal o, translitterated with ǫ)	
16B1	ᚱ	RAIDO RAD REID R	Yes	Yes	Yes	Yes	Yes	Yes
16B2	ᚲ	KAUNA	Yes					
16B3	ᚳ	CEN		Yes				
16B4	ᚴ	KAUN K			Yes	Yes	Yes	Yes
16B5	ᚵ	G					Yes	
16B6	ᚶ	ENG					Yes (Note: The 1997 ISORUNES proposed name for this was "RUNIC LETTER YOUNGER K WITH DOT", intended as representing the /ŋ/ phoneme in medieval runic inscriptions (Elder Futhark already had a separate ng-rune, sometimes shown in ligature with the i-rune (the so-called "lantern rune"))	
16B7	ᚷ	GEBO GYFU G	Yes	Yes				Yes (Note: ᚷ is an alternative stylistic representation of ᛅ in Dalecarlian use.)
16B8	ᚸ	GAR		Yes				
16B9	ᚹ	WUNJO WYNN W	Yes	Yes				Yes
16BA	ᚺ	HAGLAZ H	Yes					
16BB	ᚻ	HAEGL H		Yes				
16BC	ᚼ	LONG-BRANCH-HAGALL H			Yes			Yes
16BD	ᚽ	SHORT-TWIG-HAGALL H				Yes		
16BE	ᚾ	NAUDIZ NYD NAUD N	Yes	Yes	Yes			
16BF	ᚿ	SHORT-TWIG-NAUD N				Yes	Yes	Yes
16C0	ᛀ	DOTTED-N					Yes (Note: The 1997 ISORUNES proposed name for this was "RUNIC LETTER YOUNGER N WITH DOT", transliterated as N.)	
16C1	ᛁ	ISAZ IS ISS I	Yes	Yes	Yes	Yes	Yes	Yes
16C2	ᛂ	E					Yes	
16C3	ᛃ	JERAN J	Yes					
16C4	ᛄ	GER		Yes				
16C5	ᛅ	LONG-BRANCH-AR AE			Yes		Yes	Yes
16C6	ᛆ	SHORT-TWIG-AR A				Yes	Yes	Yes
16C7	ᛇ	IWAZ EOH	Yes	Yes				
16C8	ᛈ	PERTHO PEORTH P	Yes	Yes				
16C9	ᛉ	ALGIZ EOLHX	Yes	Yes				
16CA	ᛊ	SOWILO S	Yes					
16CB	ᛋ	SIGEL LONG-BRANCH-SOL S		Yes	Yes		Yes	Yes
16CC	ᛌ	SHORT-TWIG-SOL S				Yes	Yes	Yes
16CD	ᛍ	C					Yes	
16CE	ᛎ	Z					Yes	
16CF	ᛏ	TIWAZ TIR TYR T	Yes	Yes	Yes			
16D0	ᛐ	SHORT-TWIG-TYR T				Yes	Yes	Yes
16D1	ᛑ	D					Yes	
16D2	ᛒ	BERKANAN BEORC BJARKAN B	Yes	Yes	Yes		Yes	Yes
16D3	ᛓ	SHORT-TWIG-BJARKAN B				Yes		
16D4	ᛔ	DOTTED-P					Yes	
16D5	ᛕ	OPEN-P					Yes	
16D6	ᛖ	EHWAZ EH E	Yes	Yes				
16D7	ᛗ	MANNAZ MAN M	Yes	Yes				
16D8	ᛘ	LONG-BRANCH-MADR M			Yes		Yes	Yes
16D9	ᛙ	SHORT-TWIG-MADR M				Yes	Yes	
16DA	ᛚ	LAUKAZ LAGU LOGR L	Yes	Yes	Yes	Yes	Yes	Yes
16DB	ᛛ	DOTTED-L					Yes (Note: The 1997 ISO Runes proposed name for this was "RUNIC LETTER YOUNGER L WITH DOT", transliterated as L.)	
16DC	ᛜ	INGWAZ	Yes					
16DD	ᛝ	ING		Yes				
16DE	ᛞ	DAGAZ DAEG D	Yes	Yes				
16DF	ᛟ	OTHALAN ETHEL O	Yes	Yes				
16E0	ᛠ	EAR		Yes				Yes
16E1	ᛡ	IOR		Yes				
16E2	ᛢ	CWEORTH		Yes				
16E3	ᛣ	CALC		Yes				
16E4	ᛤ	CEALC		Yes				
16E5	ᛥ	STAN		Yes				
16E6	ᛦ	LONG-BRANCH-YR			Yes		Yes	Yes
16E7	ᛧ	SHORT-TWIG-YR				Yes		
16E8	ᛨ	ICELANDIC-YR					Yes	
16E9	ᛩ	Q					Yes	Yes
16EA	ᛪ	X					Yes	

The three "punctuation marks" are three variant forms of separators found in runic inscriptions, one a single dot, one a double dot and one cross-shaped.

Code point	Rune	Name
16EB	᛫	RUNIC SINGLE PUNCTUATION
16EC	᛬	RUNIC MULTIPLE PUNCTUATION
16ED	᛭	RUNIC CROSS PUNCTUATION

The three "runic symbols" are the Arlaug, Tvimadur and Belgthor symbols used exclusively for enumerating years in runic calendars of the early modern period.

Code point	Rune	Name
16EE	ᛮ	RUNIC ARLAUG SYMBOL
16EF	ᛯ	RUNIC TVIMADUR SYMBOL
16F0	ᛰ	RUNIC BELGTHOR SYMBOL

The eight additional characters introduced in Unicode 7.0 concern the Anglo-Saxon runes. Three are variant letters used by J. R. R. Tolkien to write Modern English in Anglo-Saxon runes, representing the English k, oo and sh graphemes. (Note: The k rune was published with The Hobbit (1937), e.g. for writing Tolkien's own name, as ᛁ ᚱ ᚱ ᛏᚩᛚᛱᛁᛖᚾ. His oo and sh runes are known from a postcard written to Katherine Farrer (sic, the name is mistakenly given as Ferrer by Everson and West) on 30 November 1947, published as no. 112 in The Letters of J. R. R. Tolkien (1981) ("A postcard, apparently written on 30 November 1947, using the system of runes employed in The Hobbit [...] Mrs Farrer, a writer of detective stories, was married to the theologian Austin Farrer, then Chaplain of Trinity College, Oxford.").)

Code point	Rune	Name
16F1	ᛱ	RUNIC LETTER K
16F2	ᛲ	RUNIC LETTER SH
16F3	ᛳ	RUNIC LETTER OO

The five others are letter variants used in one of the Franks Casket inscriptions, "cryptogrammic" replacements for the standard Anglo-Saxon o, i, e, a and æ vowel runes.

Code point	Rune	Name
16F4	ᛴ	RUNIC LETTER FRANKS CASKET OS
16F5	ᛵ	RUNIC LETTER FRANKS CASKET IS
16F6	ᛶ	RUNIC LETTER FRANKS CASKET EH
16F7	ᛷ	RUNIC LETTER FRANKS CASKET AC
16F8	ᛸ	RUNIC LETTER FRANKS CASKET AESC

== Fonts ==
Numerous Unicode fonts support the Runic block, although most of them are strictly limited to displaying a single glyph per character, often closely modeled on the shape shown in the Unicode block chart.

Free Unicode fonts that support the runic block include: Junicode, GNU FreeFont (in its monospace, bitmap face), Caslon, the serif font Quivira, and Babelstone Runic in its many different formats. Commercial fonts supporting the block include Alphabetum, Code2000, Everson Mono, Aboriginal Serif, Aboriginal Sans, Segoe UI Symbol, and TITUS Cyberbit Basic.

Microsoft Windows did not support the Runic block in any of its included fonts during 2000—2008, but with the release of Windows 7 in 2009, the system has been delivered with a font supporting the block, Segoe UI Symbol. In Windows 10 the Runic block was moved into the font Segoe UI Historic.

== Chart ==
Runic^{[1]}^{[2]} Official Unicode Consortium code chart (PDF)
	0	1	2	3	4	5	6	7	8	9	A	B	C	D	E	F
U+16Ax	ᚠ	ᚡ	ᚢ	ᚣ	ᚤ	ᚥ	ᚦ	ᚧ	ᚨ	ᚩ	ᚪ	ᚫ	ᚬ	ᚭ	ᚮ	ᚯ
U+16Bx	ᚰ	ᚱ	ᚲ	ᚳ	ᚴ	ᚵ	ᚶ	ᚷ	ᚸ	ᚹ	ᚺ	ᚻ	ᚼ	ᚽ	ᚾ	ᚿ
U+16Cx	ᛀ	ᛁ	ᛂ	ᛃ	ᛄ	ᛅ	ᛆ	ᛇ	ᛈ	ᛉ	ᛊ	ᛋ	ᛌ	ᛍ	ᛎ	ᛏ
U+16Dx	ᛐ	ᛑ	ᛒ	ᛓ	ᛔ	ᛕ	ᛖ	ᛗ	ᛘ	ᛙ	ᛚ	ᛛ	ᛜ	ᛝ	ᛞ	ᛟ
U+16Ex	ᛠ	ᛡ	ᛢ	ᛣ	ᛤ	ᛥ	ᛦ	ᛧ	ᛨ	ᛩ	ᛪ	᛫	᛬	᛭	ᛮ	ᛯ
U+16Fx	ᛰ	ᛱ	ᛲ	ᛳ	ᛴ	ᛵ	ᛶ	ᛷ	ᛸ							
Notes: 1. As of Unicode version 17.0; 2. Grey areas indicate non-assigned code points

== History ==
The following Unicode-related documents record the purpose and process of defining specific characters in the Runic block:

Version	Final code points (Note: Proposed code points and characters names may differ from final code points and names)	Count	UTC ID	L2 ID	WG2 ID	Document
3.0	U+16A0..16F0	81			N1210	Proposal Concerning Inclusion of the Runic Characters, 28 April 1995
3.0	U+16A0..16F0	81		X3L2/95-117	N1222	Everson, Michael (20 May 1995), Names and ordering of the Fuþark (Runic) characters: comment on N1210 [UTC/1995-028]
3.0	U+16A0..16F0	81	UTC/1995-xxx			"Runic Proposal", Unicode Technical Committee Meeting #65, Minutes, 2 June 1995
3.0	U+16A0..16F0	81			N1229	Response to Michael Everson comments (N 1230) on Runic, 16 June 1995
3.0	U+16A0..16F0	81			N1230	Everson, Michael (21 June 1995), Feedback on Runic
3.0	U+16A0..16F0	81			N1239	Ólafsson, Þorvaður Kári (23 June 1995), Icelandic position on Runic
3.0	U+16A0..16F0	81		X3L2/95-090	N1253 (doc, txt)	Umamaheswaran, V. S.; Ksar, Mike (9 September 1995), "6.4.8", Unconfirmed Minutes of WG 2 Meeting # 28 in Helsinki, Finland; 1995-06-26--27
3.0	U+16A0..16F0	81		X3L2/95-118	N1262	Everson, Michael (19 September 1995), Consensus Name and ordering proposal for the Fuþark
3.0	U+16A0..16F0	81		X3L2/96-035	N1330	Lundström, Wera (13 March 1996), Revised Proposal Concerning Inclusion into ISO/IEC 10646 of the Repertoire of Runic Characters
3.0	U+16A0..16F0	81		X3L2/96-051	N1382	Runic Script: Description and Proposed Character Name Table, 18 April 1996
3.0	U+16A0..16F0	81			N1353	Umamaheswaran, V. S.; Ksar, Mike (25 June 1996), "8.6", Draft minutes of WG2 Copenhagen Meeting # 30
3.0	U+16A0..16F0	81	UTC/1996-027.2			Greenfield, Steve (1 July 1996), "E. Runic", UTC #69 Minutes (PART 2)
3.0	U+16A0..16F0	81		X3L2/96-100	N1417 (doc, txt)	Second Revised Proposal for Runic Character Names, 23 July 1996
3.0	U+16A0..16F0	81		X3L2/96-101	N1443	Everson, Michael; Jarnefors, Olle (4 August 1996), Allocating Ogham and Runes to the BMP: a strategy for making the BMP maximally useful
3.0	U+16A0..16F0	81			N1453	Ksar, Mike; Umamaheswaran, V. S. (6 December 1996), "8.6", WG 2 Minutes - Quebec Meeting 31
3.0	U+16A0..16F0	81		X3L2/96-123		Aliprand, Joan; Winkler, Arnold (18 December 1996), "4.5 Runic", Preliminary Minutes - UTC #71 & X3L2 #168 ad hoc meeting, San Diego - December 5-6, 1996
3.0	U+16A0..16F0	81		L2/97-048	N1542	Everson, Michael (27 March 1997), Proposed pDAM text for Runic
3.0	U+16A0..16F0	81			N1620	Everson, Michael (3 July 1997), Runic Proposal Update
3.0	U+16A0..16F0	81		L2/97-288	N1603	Umamaheswaran, V. S. (24 October 1997), "8.5", Unconfirmed Meeting Minutes, WG 2 Meeting # 33, Heraklion, Crete, Greece, 20 June – 4 July 1997
3.0	U+16A0..16F0	81		L2/98-077	N1695	Paterson, Bruce (22 February 1998), Proposed Disposition of Comments on SC2 letter ballot on FPDAMs 16, 19, & 20 (Braille patterns, Runic, Ogham)
3.0	U+16A0..16F0	81		L2/98-132	N1771	Paterson, Bruce (6 April 1998), Revised Text of ISO 10646 Amendment 19 - Runic
3.0	U+16A0..16F0	81		L2/98-134	N1772	Paterson, Bruce (6 April 1998), Revised Text of ISO 10646 Amendment 20 - Ogham
3.0	U+16A0..16F0	81			N1763	Paterson, Bruce (6 April 1998), Disposition of Comments Report on SC 2 N2970: Amendment 19 - Runic
3.0	U+16A0..16F0	81		L2/98-286	N1703	Umamaheswaran, V. S.; Ksar, Mike (2 July 1998), "6.2.3 FPDAM-19 on Runic and FPDAM-20 on Ogham", Unconfirmed Meeting Minutes, WG 2 Meeting #34, Redmond, WA, USA; 1998-03-16--20
3.0	U+16A0..16F0	81		L2/01-023		Everson, Michael (9 January 2001), Ordering the Runic script
7.0	U+16F1..16F8	8		L2/11-096R	N4013R	Everson, Michael; West, Andrew (10 May 2011), Proposal to encode additional Runic characters in the UCS
7.0	U+16F1..16F8	8			N4103	"11.9 Additional Runic characters", Unconfirmed minutes of WG 2 meeting 58, 3 January 2012
7.0	U+16F1..16F8	8		L2/12-007		Moore, Lisa (14 February 2012), "C.5", UTC #130 / L2 #227 Minutes
7.0	U+16F1..16F8	8			N4253 (pdf, doc)	"M59.16l", Unconfirmed minutes of WG 2 meeting 59, 12 September 2012
