= Möjbro Runestone =

Coordinates: 59.8155°N 17.3568°E

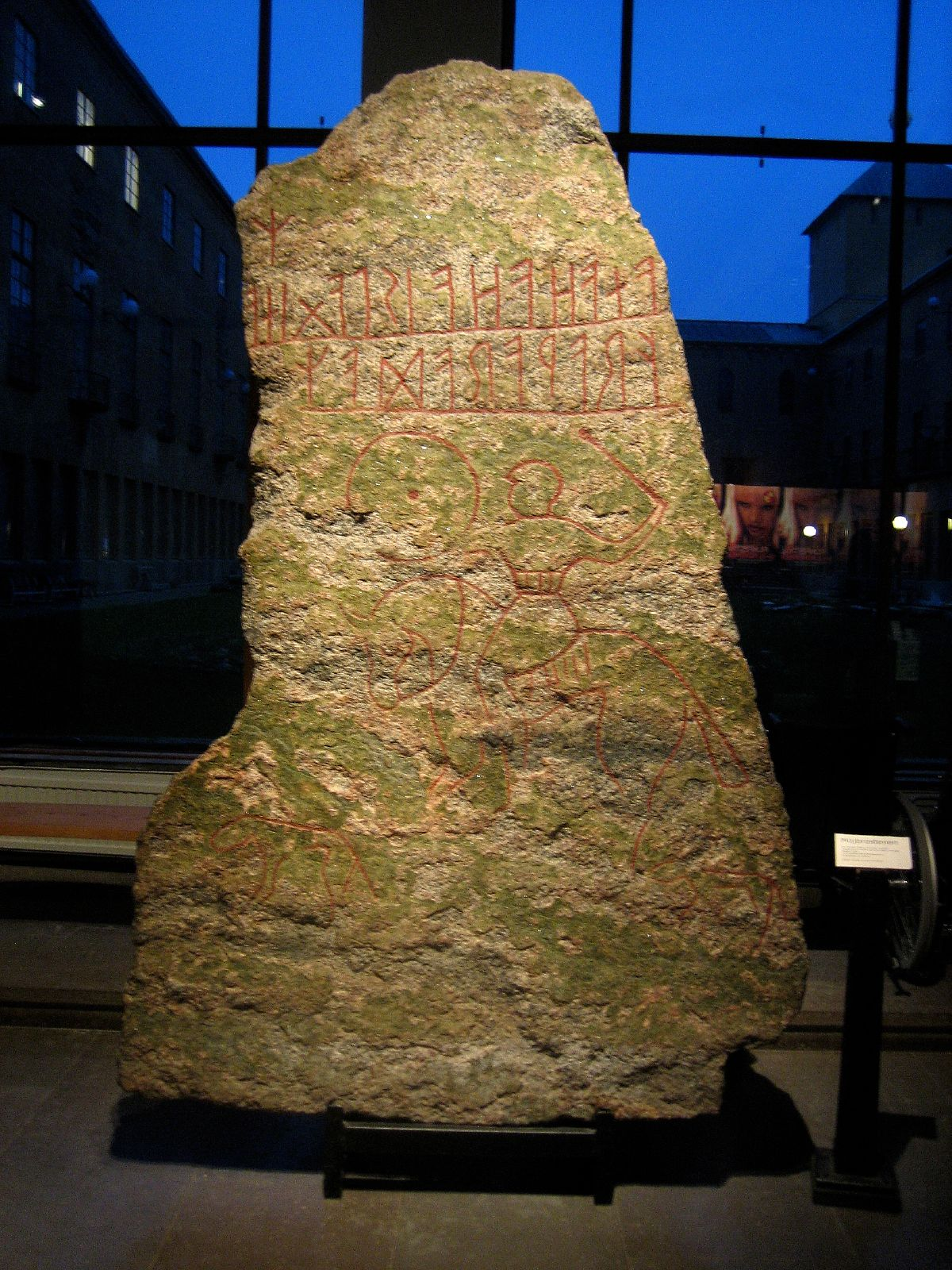
- Height: 2.46 meters
- Writing: Elder Futhark
- Created: 400-550 AD
- Discovered: 1600s AD; Möjbro, Uppland, Sweden
- Present location: Swedish Museum of National Antiquities, Sweden
- Rundata ID: U 877 U
- Runemaster: Unknown

Text – Native
- frawaradaz / anahahaisla[g]ina/z.

Translation
- Frawaradaz <anahaha> is killed.

The Möjbro Runestone is a runestone that is designated as U 877 in the Rundata catalog and is inscribed in Proto-Norse using the Elder Futhark. It was found in Möjbro, which is about 8 kilometers north of Örsundsbro in Uppsala County, Sweden, which is in the historic province of Uppland. The runestone is on display at the Swedish Museum of National Antiquities in Stockholm.

Formerly placed in the 3rd century, the inscription and drawing are now mostly placed in the 5th or early 6th centuries.

== History ==
Although the stone has been known since the initial surveys of runestones in Sweden during the 1600s, its exact original location is not known. The runestone is 2.46 metres (8 ft 1 in) in height and made of granite. It is considered to be fragile. To protect the stone and its shallow inscription, it was moved in 1948 from Möjbro to the Swedish Museum of National Antiquities.

== Drawing ==
The Möjbro Runestone is notable not only for being one of few runestones in Proto-Norse, but also for showing what is considered to be an artistically crafted image of a rider on a horse with two dogs. It is believed to have been inspired by continental Germanic images of victorious warriors on horses and that it ultimately derives from the motifs of horsemen common on tombstones of members of the Roman cavalry in late Roman Empire era art.

== Inscription ==
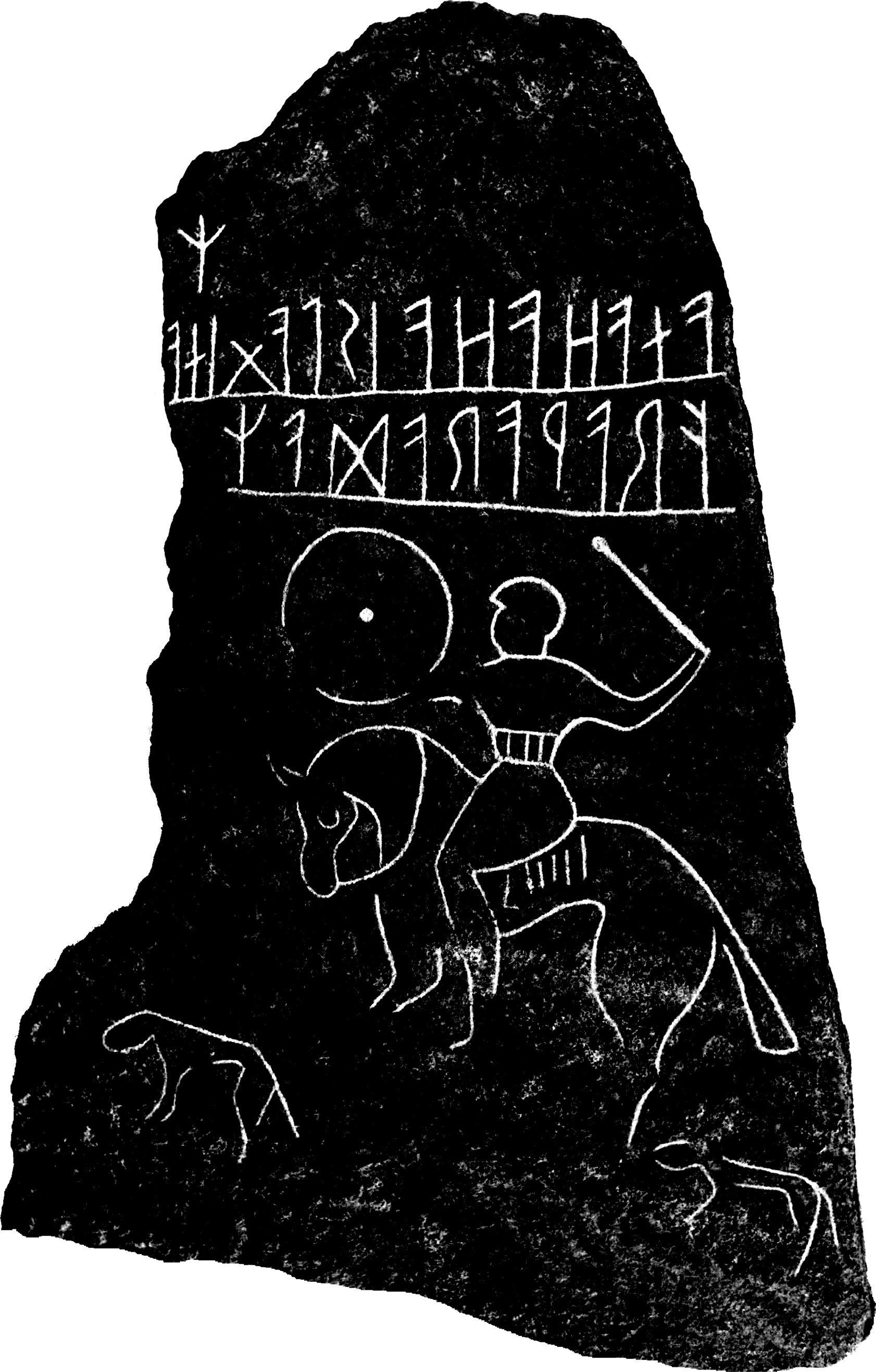
Modern tracing with the two dogs discovered in 1952.

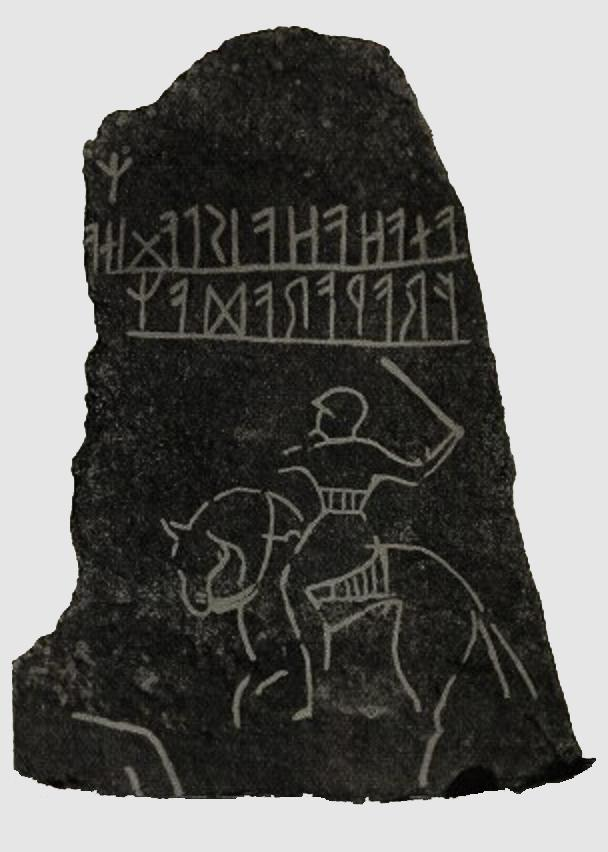
Tracing of the inscription by Oscar Montelius (1905).

The inscription is to be read from right to left, and from bottom to top. It transliterates as

frawaradaz / anahahaisla[g]ina/z.

Several interpretations have been put forth for the inscription, but the only thing that can be said with certainty on the interpretation of the inscription is that Frawaradaz is the name of a man (and even the interpretation of the name is debated).

The most common view is that the final part of the inscription is to be read as slaginaz "slain", indicating that the stone is a memorial and that it says that Frawaradaz was slain. Hempl (1900), by contrast, read langiniz, reading the letter transliterated [g] above as a bind rune (ligature) for ng (/ŋ/).

The middle part of the inscription, reading anahahai or similar, has given rise to a wide variety of tentative interpretations, most of them assuming that it gives additional information on the person of Frawaradaz or on the circumstances of his death, including "Āna, the one-eyed", "the noble", "on the racer"/"on his steed/horse", "of Hagho", "in Hagho". Grønvik (1985) gives an alternative interpretation inasmuch as he has the slaginaz refer to the horse, not the dead man, reading "Frawarādaz [is buried here] - Over [the dead one] the horse was slaughtered."

Elmevik (1978) interprets the final word as laikīnaz, preceded by the copula is: Frawarādaz ainahāhǣ is laikinaz. The ainahāhǣ is interpreted as "the only high one" (=the one most noble of all), and the is laikinaz either as "is eager to fight" or "is killed intentionally" or "is killed by witchcraft".

Krause (1966) segments the top line of text into "ana hahai slaginaz." "Hahai" here is interpreted as "hanhē," indicating both the occurrence in speech of the aspirant h preceded by a vowel and a nasal to be realised as nasalised vowel (explaining the representation as "hahai" instead of expected "hanhai) and the development of the Proto-Germanic dative ending from /-ai/ to /-ē/ over time. This second indication would suggest that the spelling on the Möjbro Runestone is an inherited, archaicised spelling from earlier Proto-Germanic.The inscription is thus interpreted to mean "on (his) steed slain."

== See also ==
- List of runestones

== Other sources ==
- The article Möjbrostenen in Nationalencyklopedin (1994).
- George Hempl (1900). "The Møjebro Runic Stone and the Runic Ligature for ng". Publications of the Modern Language Association. 15 (2): 216–220. doi:10.1632/456614. ISSN 0030-8129. Wikidata Q109469089.
