= Ehwaz =

Elder Futhark rune

Name	Proto-Germanic	Old English
Name	*Ehwaz	E(o)h
Name	"horse"	
Shape	Elder Futhark	Futhorc
Unicode	ᛖ U+16D6	
Transliteration	e	
Transcription	e	
IPA	[e(ː)]	
Position in rune-row	19	

*Ehwaz is the reconstructed Proto-Germanic name of the Elder Futhark e rune ᛖ, meaning "horse" (cognate to Latin equus, Gaulish epos, Tocharian B yakwe, Sanskrit aśva, Avestan aspa and Old Irish ech). In the Anglo-Saxon futhorc, it is continued as ᛖ eh (properly eoh, but spelled without the diphthong to avoid confusion with ᛇ ēoh "yew").

The Proto-Germanic vowel system was asymmetric and unstable. The difference between the long vowels expressed by ᛖ e and ᛇ ï (sometimes transcribed as *ē_{1} and *ē_{2}) was lost. The Younger Futhark continues neither, lacking a letter expressing e altogether. The Anglo-Saxon futhorc faithfully preserved all Elder futhorc staves, but assigned new sound values to the redundant ones, futhorc ēoh expressing a diphthong.

In the Gothic alphabet, the names of the runes were re-applied to letters derived from the Greek alphabet. The name of the Gothic letter 𐌴 (e) is attested as eyz, which has been interpreted as the Gothic word *𐌰𐌹𐍈𐍃 (*aiƕs) "horse" (note that in Gothic orthography, ⟨aí⟩ represents monophthongic /e/).

The rune may have been an original innovation, or it may have been adapted from the classical Latin alphabet's E, or from the Greek alphabet's H.

== Old English rune poem ==
The Old English rune poem has:

ᛖ Eh bẏþ for eorlum æþelinga ƿẏn,
hors hofum ƿlanc, ðær him hæleþ ẏmb[e]
ƿelege on ƿicgum ƿrixlaþ spræce
and biþ unstẏllum æfre frofur.

"The horse is a joy to princes in the presence of warriors.
A steed in the pride of its hoofs,
when rich men on horseback bandy words about it;
and it is ever a source of comfort to the restless."
