= Kalleby Runestone =

Runestone

Coordinates: 58.7164°N 11.3333°E

- Created: 5th Century
- Discovered: Kalleby, Bohuslän, Sweden
- Rundata ID: Bo Krause1966;73B $U
- Runemaster: Unknown

Text – Native
- Proto-Norse : Þrawijan haitinaz was.

Translation
- Yearning was imposed (on him). / Þrawija's (monument). (I/he) was commanded/called. / (I/He) was promised to þrawija.

The Kalleby Runestone is an enigmatic Iron Age runestone discovered in Sweden.

It is inscribed in Proto-Norse with the Elder Futhark: "þrawijan * haitinaz was". This short text has been the subject of several interpretations where þrawijan, which means "yearning", is interpreted as either a name or an epithet. The words haitinaz was mean "was named". Thus the full text is open to various interpretations, such as:

- Yearning was imposed (on him).
- Þrawija's (monument).
- (I/he) was commanded/called.
- (I/He) was promised to þrawija.

The stone is 2.1 metres (6.9 ft) tall and 1.6 metres (5.2 ft) wide, and it was part of a bridge.

== See also ==
- List of runestones

== Sources ==
- Rundata
- The runestone on the site of the Swedish National Heritage Board.
