= Thurs =

Thurs may refer to:

- Thurs, an entity from Germanic mythology. See Jötunn.
- Thurisaz (rune) ᚦ
- An abbreviation for Thursday
- Thurs, a math-statistical function
