= Gyfu =

Runic character

Name	Proto-Germanic	Old English	
Name	*Gebō	Gyfu	Gár
Name	'gift'	'gift'	"spear"
Shape	Elder Futhark	Futhorc	
Unicode	ᚷ U+16B7	ᚷ U+16B7	ᚸ U+16B8
Transliteration	g	ȝ	g
Transcription	g	ȝ, g	g
IPA	[ɣ]	[g], [ɣ], [ʎ], [j]	[g]
Position in rune-row	7	7	33

Gyfu is the name for the g-rune ᚷ in the Anglo-Saxon rune poem, meaning 'gift' or 'generosity':

Old English Rune Poem:	Modern English Translation:
ᚷ Gẏfu gumena bẏþ gleng and herenẏs, ƿraþu and ƿẏrþscẏpe and ƿræcna gehƿam ar and ætƿist, ðe bẏþ oþra leas.	Generosity brings credit and honour, which support one's dignity; it furnishes help and subsistence to all broken men who are devoid of aught else.

The corresponding letter of the Gothic alphabet is 𐌲 g, called giba. The same rune also appears in the Elder Futhark, with a suggested Proto-Germanic name *gebô 'gift'. J. H. Looijenga speculates that the rune is directly derived from Latin Χ, the pronunciation of which may have been similar to Germanic g in the 1st century, e.g., Gothic *reihs compared to Latin rex (as opposed to the Etruscan alphabet, where /𐌗 had a value of [s]).

The gyfu rune is sometimes used as a symbol within modern mysticism, particularly amongst those interested in Celtic mythology. It's described, for example, in the book The Runic Tarot as a representation of the giving-receiving balance in friendships.

== Anglo-Saxon gār rune ==
In addition to gyfu, the Anglo-Saxon futhorc has the gār rune ⟨ᚸ⟩, named after a species of medieval spear. It is attested epigraphically on the Ruthwell Cross, and also appears in 11th-century manuscript tradition. Phonetically, gār represents the /g/ sound. It is a modification of the plain gyfu rune ᚷ.

Old English 'gār' means 'spear', but the name of the rune likely echoes the rune names ger, ear, ior: due to palatalization in Old English, the original g rune (i.e., the Gyfu rune ⟨ᚷ⟩) could express either /j/ or /g/ (see yogh). The ger unambiguously expressed /j/, and the newly introduced gar rune had the purpose of unambiguously expressing /g/.

Gār is the 33rd and final rune in the row as given in Cotton Domitian A.ix.

== See also ==
- Armanen runes § Gibor, 19th-century pseudo-runes of which the 18th character's name is similar to *gebô
