= Nyd =

Nyd or NYD may refer to:

- New Year's Day, first day of the new year
- New Years Day (band), an American rock band
- New York Dolls, another American rock band
- New York Dragons, American football team in the now defunct Arena Football League
- Ny Demokrati, Swedish political party (translates as New Democracy)
- Nyd (rune) (ᚾ), a rune of the Anglo-Saxon fuþorc and continuation of the Elder Fuþark naudiz
