= Mannaz =

M-rune of the Elder Futhark

Name	Proto-Germanic	Old English	Old Norse	
Name	*mannaz	man[n]	maðr	
Name	'man, human'			
Shape	Elder Futhark	Futhorc	Younger Futhark	
Unicode	ᛗ U+16D7		ᛘ U+16D8	ᛙ U+16D9
Transliteration	m			
Transcription	m			
IPA	[m]			
Position in rune-row	20		14	

Two early forms of the /m/ rune of the Younger Futhark.

Mannaz is the conventional name of the /m/ rune ᛗ of the Elder Futhark. It is derived from the reconstructed Proto-Germanic (or Common Germanic) word for 'man', *mannaz.

The Younger Futhark equivalent ᛘ is maðr ('man'). It took up the shape of the algiz rune ᛉ, replacing Elder Futhark ᛗ.

As its sound value and form in the Elder Futhark indicate, it is derived from the letter for /m/, 𐌌, in the Old Italic alphabets, ultimately from the Greek letter mu (uppercase Μ, lowercase μ).

== Rune poems ==
The rune is recorded in all three rune poems, in the Norwegian and Icelandic poems as maðr, and in the Anglo-Saxon poem as man.

Rune poem	English translation
Old Norwegian: ᛉ Maðr er moldar auki; mikil er græip á hauki.	Man is an augmentation of the soil; great is the claw of the hawk.
Old Icelandic: ᛉ Maðr er manns gaman ok moldar auki ok skipa skreytir.	Man is the joy of man and augmentation of the soil and adorner of ships.
Old English: ᛗ Man bẏþ on mẏrgþe his magan leof: sceal þeah anra gehƿẏlc oðrum sƿican, forðum drẏhten ƿẏle dome sine þæt earme flæsc eorþan betæcan.	The joyous man is dear to his kinsmen; yet every man is doomed to fail his fellow, since the Lord by his decree will commit the vile carrion to the earth.

== Modern usage ==
For the 'man' rune of the Armanen Futharkh as the 'life' rune in Germanic mysticism, see Lebensrune.
