= Eihwaz =

Proto-Germanic name of a rune

Name	Proto-Germanic	Old English
Name	*Ē_{2}haz / *Ē_{2}waz	Éoh
Name	"yew"	
Shape	Elder Futhark	Futhorc
Unicode	ᛇ U+16C7	
Transliteration	ï	ï
Transcription	ï	ï
IPA	[iː], [ç]?	[iː], [x], [ç]
Position in rune-row	13	

Eiwaz or Eihaz is the reconstructed Proto-Germanic name of the rune ᛇ, coming from a word for "yew". Two variants of the word are reconstructed for Proto-Germanic, *īhaz (*ē²haz, from Proto-Indo-European *eikos), continued in Old English as ēoh (also īh), and *īwaz (*ē²waz, from Proto-Indo-European *eiwos), continued in Old English as īw (whence English yew). The latter is possibly an early loan from the Celtic, compare Gaulish ivos, Breton ivin, Welsh ywen, Old Irish eó. The common spelling of the rune's name, "Eihwaz", combines the two variants; strictly based on the Old English evidence, a spelling "Eihaz" would be more proper.

Following the convention of Wolfgang Krause, the rune's standard transliteration today is ï, though this designation is somewhat arbitrary as the rune's purpose and origin are still not well understood. Elmer Antonsen and Leo Connolly theorized that the rune originally stood for a Proto-Germanic vowel lost by the time of the earliest known runic inscriptions, though they put forth different vowels (Antonsen put forth [æː] while Connolly put forth [ɨ(ː)]). Ottar Grønvik proposed [ç]. Tineke Looijenga postulates the rune was originally a bindrune of ᛁ and ᛃ, having the sound value of [ji(ː)] or [i(ː)j]. Bengt Odenstedt suggests it may have been adapted from the classical Latin alphabet's Z, or Y.

The rune survives in the Anglo-Saxon futhorc as ᛇ Ēoh or Īh "yew" (note that ᛖ eoh "horse" has a short diphthong). In futhorc inscriptions Ēoh appears as both a vowel around /iː/, and as a consonant around [x] and [ç]. As a vowel, Ēoh shows up in jïslheard (ᛡᛇᛋᛚᚻᛠᚱᛞ) on the Dover Stone. As a consonant, Ēoh shows up in almeïttig (ᚪᛚᛗᛖᛇᛏᛏᛁᚷ) on the Ruthwell Cross.

The Old English rune poem reads:

ᛇ Eoh bẏþ utan unſmeþe treoƿ,
heard hruſan fæſt, hẏrde fẏreſ,
ƿẏrtrumun underƿreþẏd, ƿẏn on eþle.

The yew is a tree with rough bark,
hard and fast in the earth, supported by its roots,
a guardian of flame and a joy on native land.

== See also ==
- Wolfsangel, similar shape to the Eihwaz rune
