= Kaunan =

Rune

Name	Proto-Germanic	Old English	Old Norse
Name	*Kauną^{?}	Cén	Kaun
Name	?	"torch"	"ulcer"
Shape	Elder Futhark	Futhorc	Younger Futhark
Unicode	ᚲ U+16B2	ᚳ U+16B3	ᚴ U+16B4
Transliteration	k	c	k
Transcription	k	c	k, g
IPA	[k]	[k], [c], [tʃ]	[k], [g]
Position in rune-row	6		

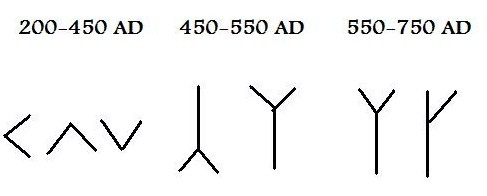
The evolution of the rune in the elder futhark during the centuries

The k-rune ᚲ (Younger Futhark ᚴ, Anglo-Saxon futhorc ᚳ) is called Kaun in both the Norwegian and Icelandic rune poems, meaning "ulcer". The reconstructed Proto-Germanic name is *Kauną. It is also known as Kenaz ("torch"), based on its Anglo-Saxon name.

The Elder Futhark shape is likely directly based on Old Italic c (𐌂) and on Latin C. The Younger Futhark and Anglo-Saxon Futhorc shapes have parallels in Old Italic shapes of k (𐌊) and Latin K (compare the Negau helmet inscription). The corresponding Gothic letter is 𐌺 k, called kusma.

The shape of the Younger Futhark kaun rune (ᚴ) is identical to that of the "bookhand" s rune in the Anglo-Saxon futhorc. The ᚴ rune also occurs in some continental runic inscriptions. It has been suggested that in these instances, it represents the ch /χ/ sound resulting from the Old High German sound shift (e.g. ᛖᛚᚴ elch in Nordendorf II).

Rune Poem:	English Translation:
Old Norwegian ᚴ Kaun er barna bǫlvan; bǫl gørver nán fǫlvan.	Ulcer is fatal to children; death makes a corpse pale.
Old Icelandic ᚴ Kaun er barna böl ok bardaga [för] ok holdfúa hús. flagella konungr.	Disease fatal to children and painful spot and abode of mortification.
Old English ᚳ Cen bẏþ cƿicera gehƿam, cuþ on fẏre blac ond beorhtlic, bẏrneþ oftust ðær hi æþelingas inne restaþ.	The torch is known to every living man by its pale, bright flame; it always burns where princes sit within.
Notes: The Icelandic poem is glossed with Latin flagella "whip".; The Anglo-Saxon poem gives the name cen "torch".
