= Naudiz =

Runic alphabet letter

Name	Proto-Germanic	Old English	Old Norse	
Name	*Naudiz	Nýd	Nauðr	
Name	"need, hardship"			
Shape	Elder Futhark	Futhorc	Younger Futhark	
Unicode	ᚾ U+16BE		ᚾ U+16BE	ᚿ U+16BF
Transliteration	n			
Transcription	n			
IPA	[n]			
Position in rune-row	10		8	

*Naudiz is the reconstructed Proto-Germanic name of the n-rune ᚾ, meaning "need, distress". In the Anglo-Saxon futhorc, it is continued as ᚾ nyd, in the Younger Futhark as ᚾ, Icelandic naud and Old Norse nauðr. The corresponding Gothic letter is 𐌽 n, named nauþs.

The rune may have been an original innovation, or it may have been adapted from the Rhaetic's alphabet's N.

The valkyrie Sigrdrífa in Sigrdrífumál talks (to Sigurd) about the rune as a beer-rune and that "You should learn beer-runes if you don’t want another man’s wife to abuse your trust if you have a tryst. Carve them on the drinking-horn and on the back of your hand, and carve the rune ᚾ on your fingernail."

The rune is recorded in all three rune poems:

Rune Poem:	English Translation:
Old Norwegian ᚾ Nauðr gerer næppa koste; nøktan kælr í froste.	Constraint gives scant choice; a naked man is chilled by the frost.
Old Icelandic ᚾ Nauð er Þýjar þrá ok þungr kostr ok vássamlig verk. opera niflungr.	Constraint is grief of the bond-maid and state of oppression and toilsome work.
Old English ᚾ Nẏd bẏþ nearu on breostan; ƿeorþeþ hi þeah oft niþa bearnum to helpe and to hæle gehƿæþre, gif hi his hlẏstaþ æror.	Trouble is oppressive to the heart; yet often it proves a source of help and salvation to the children of men, to everyone who heeds it betimes.

== See also ==
- Elder Futhark
- Younger Futhark
- Rune poem
