= Thurisaz =

Runic alphabet letter

Name	Proto-Germanic	Old English	Old Norse
Name	*Þurisaz	Þorn	Þurs
Name	"giant"	"thorn"	"giant"
Shape	Elder Futhark	Futhorc	Younger Futhark
Unicode	ᚦ U+16A6		
Transliteration	þ		
Transcription	þ	þ, ð	
IPA	[θ]	[θ], [ð]	
Position in rune-row	3		

The rune ᚦ is called Thurs (Old Norse Þurs, from a reconstructed Common Germanic *Þurisaz) in the Icelandic and Norwegian rune poems. In the Anglo-Saxon rune poem it is called thorn, whence the name of the letter þ derived. It is transliterated as þ, and has the sound value of a voiceless dental fricative /θ/ (the English sound of th as in thing).

The rune is absent from the earliest Vimose inscriptions, but it is found in the Thorsberg chape inscription, dated to ca. AD 200.

The rune may have been an original innovation, or it may have been adapted from the classical Latin alphabet's D, or from the Rhaetic alphabet's Θ.

== Name ==
In Anglo-Saxon England, the same rune was called Thorn or "Þorn" and it survives as the Icelandic letter Þ (þ). An attempt has been made to account for the substitution of names by taking "thorn" to be a kenning (metaphor) for "giant".

It is disputed as to whether a distinct system of Gothic runes ever existed, but it is clear that most of the names (but not most of the shapes) of the letters of the Gothic alphabet correspond to those of the Elder Futhark. The name of 𐌸, the Gothic letter corresponding to Þ, is an exception: it is recorded as thyth in the Codex Vindobonensis 795, which has been interpreted as the Gothic word þiuþ "(the) good", and as such unrelated to either þurs or þorn. The lack of agreement between the various glyphs and their names in Gothic, Anglo-Saxon, and Old Norse makes it difficult to reconstruct the Elder Futhark rune's Proto-Germanic name.

Assuming that the Scandinavian name þurs is the most plausible reflex of the Elder Futhark name, a Common Germanic form *þurisaz can be reconstructed (cf. Old English þyrs "giant, ogre" and Old High German duris-es "(of the) giant").

== Rune poems ==
The Germanic rune ᚦ is mentioned in three rune poems:

Rune Poem:	English Translation:
Old Norwegian ᚦ Þurs vældr kvinna kvillu, kátr værðr fár af illu.	Thurs ["Giant"] causes anguish to women, misfortune makes few men cheerful.
Old Icelandic ᚦ Þurs er kvenna kvöl ok kletta búi ok varðrúnar verr. Saturnus þengill.	Thurs ["Giant"] is torture of women and cliff-dweller and husband of a giantess Saturn's thegn. [The source of this line in the poem is unclear.]
Old English ᚦ Ðorn bẏþ ðearle scearp; ðegna gehƿẏlcum anfeng ẏs ẏfẏl, ungemetum reþe manna gehƿẏlcun, ðe him mid resteð.	The thorn is exceedingly sharp, an evil thing for any thegn to touch, uncommonly severe on all who sit among them.
Notes: In the Icelandic poem, Saturn possibly refers to Ymir or Útgarða-Loki.

== See also ==
- Rune poem
- Old English rune poem
