= Sowilō (rune) =

Runic alphabet letter

Name	Proto-Germanic	Old English	Old Norse	
Name	*Sōwilō	Sigel	Sól	
Name	"Sun"			
Shape	Elder Futhark	Futhorc	Younger Futhark	
Unicode	ᛊ U+16CA	ᛋ U+16CB	ᛋ U+16CB	ᛌ U+16CC
Transliteration	s			
Transcription	s		s, z	
IPA	[s]		[s], [z]	
Position in rune-row	16		11	

Sowilo (*sōwilō), meaning "sun", is the reconstructed Proto-Germanic language name of the s-rune (ᛊ, ᛋ).

The letter is a direct adoption of Old Italic (Etruscan or Latin) s (𐌔), ultimately from Greek sigma (Σ). It is present in the earliest inscriptions of the 2nd to 3rd century (Vimose, Kovel).

The name is attested for the same rune in all three Rune Poems. It appears as Old Norse and Old Icelandic Sól and as Old English Sigel.

== Name ==
The Germanic words for "Sun" have the peculiarity of alternating between -l- and -n- stems, Proto-Germanic *sunnon (Old English sunne, Old Norse, Old Saxon and Old High German sunna) vs. *sōwilō or *sōwulō (Old Norse sól, Gothic sauil, also Old High German forms such as suhil). This continues a Proto-Indo-European alternation *suwen- vs. *sewol- (Avestan xᵛə̄ṇg vs. Latin sōl, Greek helios, Sanskrit surya, Welsh haul, Breton heol, Old Irish suil "eye"), a remnant of an archaic heteroclitic declension pattern that remained productive only in the Anatolian languages.

The Old English name of the rune, written sigel (pronounced /ˈsɪ.jel/) is most often explained as a remnant of an otherwise extinct l-stem variant of the word for "Sun" (meaning that the spelling with g is unetymological), but alternative suggestions have been put forward, such as deriving it from Latin sigillum (assuming that the y is the unetymological element instead).

== Development and variants ==
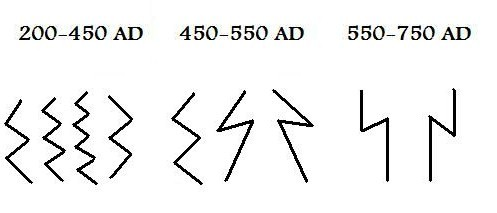
The evolution of the rune in the Elder Futhark during the centuries.

The Elder Futhark s rune is attested in main two variants, a "Σ shape" (four strokes), more prevalent in earlier (3rd to 5th century) inscriptions (e.g. Kylver stone), and an "S shape" (three strokes), more prevalent in later (5th to 7th century) inscriptions (e.g. Golden horns of Gallehus, Seeland-II-C).

The Younger Futhark Sol and the Anglo-Saxon futhorc Sigel runes are identical in shape, a rotated version of the later Elder Futhark rune, with the middle stroke slanting upwards, and the initial and final strokes vertical.

The Anglo-Saxon runes developed a variant shape (ᚴ), called the "bookhand" s rune because it is probably inspired by the long s (ſ) in Insular script. This variant form is used in the futhorc given on the Seax of Beagnoth.

== Rune poems ==
Rune poem	English translation
Old Norwegian ᛋ Sól er landa ljóme; lúti ek helgum dóme.	Sun is the light of the world; I bow to the divine decree.
Old Icelandic ᛋ Sól er skýja skjöldr ok skínandi röðull ok ísa aldrtregi. rota siklingr.	Sun is the shield of the clouds and shining ray and destroyer of ice.
Old English ᛋ Sigel semannum sẏmble biþ on hihte, ðonne hi hine feriaþ ofer fisces beþ, oþ hi brimhengest bringeþ to lande.	The sun is ever a joy in the hopes of seafarers when they journey away over the fishes' bath, until the courser of the deep bears them to land.

Elder Futhark Sowilo rune, earlier ("Σ") variant.

Elder Futhark Sowilo rune, later ("S") variant.

Anglo-Saxon Sigel / Younger Futhark Sol rune

Anglo-Saxon "bookhand s"

== Relationship with the Armanen and SS runes ==
The SS emblem, formed of two Armanen Siegrunes ("victory runes")

Guido von List used Sowilō as the basis for the Armanen sig rune, also known as the Siegrune.

The Armanen sig rune was adapted into the emblem of the SS in 1933 by Walter Heck. Heck's design consisted of two sig runes drawn side by side like lightning bolts and was adopted by all branches of the SS.

== See also ==
- The Lindholm "amulet" that bears the word Sawilagaz which is interpreted as "the one of the Sun"
- Rune poem
- Sigelwara Land
- Sól (Germanic mythology)
- Opel, the logo for which resembles the Sowilō rune

== Sources ==
- Yenne, Bill (2010). Hitler's Master of the Dark Arts: Himmler's Black Knights and the Occult Origins of the SS. Voyageur Press. ISBN 978-0-7603-3778-3.
