= Ansuz (rune) =

Runic alphabet letter

Name	Proto-Germanic	Old English			Old Norse	
Name	*Ansuz	Ós	Ác	Æsc	Óss	
Name	"god"	"god"	"oak"	"ash"	"god"	
Shape	Elder Futhark	Futhorc			Younger Futhark	
Unicode	ᚨ U+16A8	ᚩ U+16A9	ᚪ U+16AA	ᚫ U+16AB	ᚬ U+16AC	ᚭ U+16AD
Transliteration	a	o	a	æ	ą	
Transcription	a	o	a	æ	ą, o	
IPA	[a(ː)]	[o(ː)]	[ɑ(ː)]	[æ(ː)]	[ɑ̃], [o(ː)]	
Position in rune-row	4	4	25	26	4	

Ansuz is the conventional name given to the a-rune of the Elder Futhark, ᚨ. The name is based on Proto-Germanic *ansuz, denoting a deity belonging to the principal pantheon in Germanic paganism.

The shape of the rune is likely from Neo-Etruscan a, like Latin A ultimately from Phoenician aleph.

== Name ==
In the Norwegian rune poem, óss is given a meaning of "estuary" while in the Anglo-Saxon one, ōs ᚩ takes the Latin meaning of "mouth". The Younger Futhark rune is transliterated as ą to distinguish it from the new ár rune (ᛅ), which continues the jēran rune after loss of prevocalic *j- in Proto-Norse *jár (Old Saxon jār).

Since the name of a is attested in the Gothic alphabet as ahsa or aza, the common Germanic name of the rune may thus either have been *ansuz "god", or *ahsam "ear (of wheat)".

== Development in Anglo-Saxon runes ==
The Anglo-Saxon futhorc split the Elder Futhark a rune into three independent runes due to the development of the vowel system in Anglo-Frisian. These three runes are ōs ᚩ (transliterated o), āc "oak" ᚪ (transliterated a), and æsc ᚫ "ash" (transliterated æ).

== Development in Younger Futhark ==
Variations of the rune in Younger Futhark.

The Younger Futhark corresponding to the Elder Futhark ansuz rune is ᚬ, called óss. It is transliterated as ą. This represented the phoneme /ɑ̃/, and sometimes /æ/ (also written ᛅ) and /o/ (also written ᚢ). The variant grapheme ᚯ became independent as representing the phoneme /ø/ during the 11th to 14th centuries.

== Rune poems ==
It is mentioned in all three rune poems:

Rune Poem:	English Translation:
Old Norwegian ᚬ Óss er flæstra færða fǫr; en skalpr er sværða.	Estuary is the way of most journeys; but a scabbard is of swords.
Old Icelandic; ᚬ Óss er alldingautr; ok ásgarðs jǫfurr; ok valhallar vísi; Jupiter oddviti	Aesir (Odin) is olden Gaut; and Asgard's chief; and Valhall's leader; Latin analog to Odin + heiti for King
Old English ᚩ Ós bẏþ ordfruma ælcre spræce wisdomes wraþu and witena frofur, and eorla gehwam eadnẏs and tohiht.	The mouth is the source of all language, a pillar of wisdom and a comfort to wise men, a blessing and a joy to every knight.
Notes: In the Icelandic poem, Óss refers to Odin.
