= Isaz =

Runic alphabet letter

Name	Proto-Germanic	Old English	Old Norse
Name	*Isaz	Ís	Íss
Name	"ice"		
Shape	Elder Futhark	Futhorc	Younger Futhark
Unicode	ᛁ U+16C1		
Transliteration	i		
Transcription	i		
IPA	[i(ː)]		
Position in rune-row	11		9

*Isaz is the reconstructed Proto-Germanic name of the i-rune ᛁ, meaning "ice". In the Younger Futhark, it is called íss in Old Norse. As a rune of the Anglo-Saxon futhorc, it is called is.

The corresponding Gothic letter is 𐌹 i, named eis.

The rune is recorded in all three rune poems:

Rune Poem:	English Translation:
Old English ᛁ Is bẏþ oferceald, ungemetum slidor, glisnaþ glæshluttur gimmum gelicust, flor forste geƿoruht, fæger ansẏne.	Ice is very cold and immeasurably slippery; it glistens as clear as glass and most like to gems; it is a floor wrought by the frost, fair to look upon.
Old Icelandic ᛁ Íss er árbörkr ok unnar þak ok feigra manna fár.	Ice is bark of rivers and roof of the wave and destruction of the doomed.
Old Norwegian ᛁ Ís kǫllum brú bræiða; blindan þarf at læiða.	Ice is called the broad bridge; the blind man must be led.

== See also ==
- Elder Futhark
- Younger Futhark
- Rune poem
