= Elder Futhark =

System of runes for Proto-Germanic

- Script type: Alphabet
- Period: 2nd to 8th centuries
- Direction: Left-to-right, boustrophedon
- Languages: Proto-Germanic, Proto-Norse, Gothic, Alemannic, Old High German

Related scripts
- Parent systems: Phoenician alphabet: Greek alphabet (Cumae variant); Old Italic alphabet; Latin alphabet?; Elder Futhark
- Child systems: Younger Futhark, Anglo-Saxon futhorc

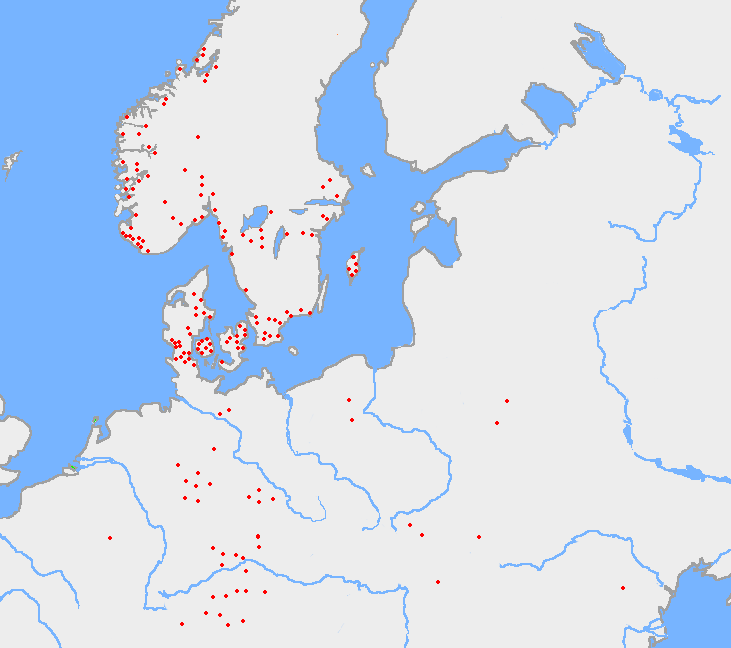
Distribution of pre–sixth-century Elder Futhark finds

The Elder Futhark, (Note: Less common forms includes: Older Futhark, Old Futhark) or Pan-Germanic Futhark (also spelt Fuþark, /ˈfuːθɑːrk/, FOO-thark), is the oldest form of the runic alphabets. It was a writing system used by Germanic peoples in the Migration Period. Inscriptions are found on artifacts including jewellery, amulets, plateware, tools, and weapons, as well as runestones, from the 2nd to the 8th centuries.

In Scandinavia, beginning in the late 8th century, the script was simplified to the Younger Futhark, while the Anglo-Saxons and Frisians instead extended it, giving rise to the Anglo-Saxon futhorc. Both the Anglo-Saxon futhorc and the Younger Futhark remained in use during the Early and the High Middle Ages respectively, but knowledge of how to read the Elder Futhark was forgotten until 1865, when it was deciphered by Norwegian scholar Sophus Bugge.

== Description ==
The Elder Futhark is named after the initial phoneme of the first six rune names: /f/, /u/, /ð/, /ɑ/, /r/, and /k/ corresponding with ᚠ, ᚢ, ᚦ, ᚨ, ᚱ, and ᚲ respectively. It has 24 runes, often arranged in three groups of eight runes; each group is in modern times called an ætt, Old Norse for 'lineage', the term used in Younger Futhark. It has been speculated to potentially stem from Elder Futhark and thought to mean 'group of eight'. (Note: Johannes Bureus 15-type runic row had 3 groups of 5 called femt (lit. 'fifth').) Irish Ogham features a similar division system.

| f | u | þ | a | r | k | g | w |
| h | n | i | j | ï | p | z | s |
| t | b | e | m | l | ŋ | d | o |

What the groups were originally called remains unknown. In the following table, each rune is given with its common transliteration and phoneme:

ætt 1
| rune | ᚠ | ᚢ | ᚦ | ᚨ | ᚱ | ᚲ | ᚷ | ᚹ |
| transliteration | ⟨f⟩ | ⟨u⟩ | ⟨þ⟩ | ⟨a⟩ | ⟨r⟩ | ⟨k⟩ | ⟨g⟩ | ⟨w⟩ |
| phoneme | /f/ | /u/ | /θ/ or /ð/ | /ɑ/ | /r/ | /k/ | /g/ | /w/ |
ætt 2
| rune | ᚺ | ᚾ | ᛁ | ᛃ | ᛇ | ᛈ | ᛉ | ᛊ |
| transliteration | ⟨h⟩ | ⟨n⟩ | ⟨i⟩ | ⟨j⟩ | ⟨ï⟩ or ⟨æ⟩ | ⟨p⟩ | ⟨z⟩ or ⟨ʀ⟩ | ⟨s⟩ |
| phoneme | /h/ | /n/ | /i/ | /j/ | /ɪ/ or /æ/ | /p/ | /z/ or /r₂/ (Note: Rune ᛉ was Proto-Germanic /z/ and evolved into Proto-Norse /r₂/.) | /s/ |
ætt 3
| rune | ᛏ | ᛒ | ᛖ | ᛗ | ᛚ | ᛜ | ᛞ | ᛟ |
| transliteration | ⟨t⟩ | ⟨b⟩ | ⟨e⟩ | ⟨m⟩ | ⟨l⟩ | ⟨ŋ⟩ | ⟨d⟩ | ⟨o⟩ |
| phoneme | /t/ | /b/ | /e/ | /m/ | /l/ | /ŋ/ | /d/ | /o/ |

The earliest known sequential listing of the alphabet dates to 400 AD and is found on the Kylver Stone in Gotland, [ᚠ] and [ᚹ] only partially inscribed but widely authenticated:

| [ᚠ] | ᚢ | ᚦ | ᚨ | ᚱ | ᚲ | ᚷ | [ᚹ] | ᚺ | ᚾ | ᛁ | ᛃ | ᛈ | ᛇ | ᛉ | ᛊ | ᛏ | ᛒ | ᛖ | ᛗ | ᛚ | ᛜ | ᛞ | ᛟ |
| [f] | u | þ | a | r | k | g | [w] | h | n | i | j | p | ï | z | s | t | b | e | m | l | ŋ | d | o |

Two instances of another early inscription were found on the two Vadstena and Mariedamm bracteates (6th century), showing the division in three ætts, with the positions of ï, p and o, d inverted compared to the Kylver stone:

f u þ a r k g w; h n i j ï p z s; t b e m l ŋ o d

The Grumpan bracteate presents a listing from 500 which is identical to the one found on the previous bracteates but incomplete:

f u þ a r k g w ... h n i j ï p (z) ... t b e m l (ŋ) (o) d

== Origins ==
=== Derivation from Italic alphabets ===
The Elder Futhark runes are commonly believed to originate in the Old Italic scripts: either a North Italic variant (Etruscan or Rhaetic alphabets), or the Latin alphabet itself. Derivation from the Greek alphabet via Gothic contact to Byzantine Greek culture was a popular theory in the 19th century, but has been ruled out since the dating of the Vimose inscriptions to the 2nd century (whereas the Goths were in contact with Greek culture only from the early 3rd century). Conversely, the Greek-derived 4th-century Gothic alphabet does have two letters that may have been derived from runes, 𐌾 (from Jer ᛃ j) and 𐌿 (from Uruz ᚢ u).

The main problem is that a derivation from the classical Latin alphabet as used in the 1st and 2nd centuries, while the most obvious possibility suggested by the historical, geographical and cultural context, is not as straightforward as could be expected, especially regarding letter shapes, and many scholars are not satisfied by it. Instead, it is observed that many runic letters suspiciously resemble letters with similar sound values from alphabets used in the Alpine region in the last centuries BC, alphabets which are all derived from the northern Etruscan alphabet; however, again, there is no derivation so straightforward as to convince most scholars.

The angular shapes of the runes, presumably an adaptation to the incision in wood or metal, are not a Germanic innovation, but a property that is shared with other early alphabets, including the Old Italic ones (compare, for example, the Duenos inscription). The 4th century BC Negau helmet B inscription features a Germanic name, Harigastiz, in a North Etruscan alphabet, and may be a testimony of the earliest contact of Germanic speakers with alphabetic writing. Similarly, the Meldorf inscription of 50 AD may qualify as "proto-runic" use of the Latin alphabet by Germanic speakers. The Rhaetic "alphabet of Bolzano" in particular seems to fit the letter shapes well. The spearhead of Kovel, dated to 200 AD, sometimes advanced as evidence of a peculiar Gothic variant of the runic alphabet, bears an inscription tilarids that may in fact be in an Old Italic rather than a runic alphabet, running right to left with a T and a D closer to the Latin or Etruscan than to the Bolzano or runic alphabets. Perhaps an "eclectic" approach can yield the best results for the explanation of the origin of the runes: most shapes of the letters can be accounted for when deriving them from several distinct North Italic writing systems: The p rune has a parallel in the Camunic alphabet, while it has been argued that d derives from the shape of the letter san (= ś) in Lepontic, where it seems to represent the sound /d/.

The g, a, f, i, t, m and l runes show no variation, and are generally accepted as identical to the Old Italic or Latin letters X, A, F, I, T, M and L, respectively. There is also wide agreement that the u, r, k, h, s, b and o runes respectively correspond directly to V, R, C, H, S, B and O.

The remaining ten runes of uncertain derivation may either be original innovations, or adaptions of otherwise unneeded Latin letters of the classical Latin alphabet (1st century, ignoring marginalized K). There are conflicting scholarly opinions regarding them:

1. ᛖ may be from E.
2. ᚾ may be from Raetic N.
3. ᚦ may be from Latin D or from Raetic Θ.
4. ᚹ may be from Q, from Latin P, or from Raetic W.
5. ᛇ may be from Latin Z, from Latin Y, or from Raetic E.
6. ᛉ may be from Raetic Z, from Latin Y, or from Etruscan 𐌙.
7. ᛜ may be from Latin Q.
8. ᛃ may be from Latin G.
9. ᛈ may be from Raetic P or may be an original Germanic innovation.
10. ᛞ may be from Raetic D, from Lepontic san (ś), or may be an original Germanic innovation.

Of the 24 runes in the classical futhark row attested from 400 (on the Kylver stone), ï, p (Note: Speculated by Looijenga 1997 to be a variant of b.) and ŋ (Note: Westergaard 1981 postulates occurrence in 34 Vimose and 23 Letcani, rejected by Odenstedt 1990, p. 118.) are unattested in the earliest inscriptions of c. 175 to 400, while e in this early period mostly takes a Π-shape, its M-shape gaining prevalence only from the 5th century. Similarly, the s rune may have either three or four strokes (and more rarely five or more), and only from the 5th century does the variant with three strokes become prevalent.

The "mature" runes of the 6th to 8th centuries tend to have only three directions of strokes, the vertical and two diagonal directions. Early inscriptions also show horizontal strokes: these appear in the case of e (mentioned above), but also in t, l, ŋ and h.

=== Date and purpose of invention ===
The general agreement dates the creation of the first runic alphabet to roughly the 1st century. Early estimates include the 1st century, and late estimates push the date into the 2nd century. The question is one of estimating the "findless" period separating the script's creation from the Vimose finds of c. 160. If either ï or z indeed derive from Latin Y or respectively Z, as suggested by Odenstedt, the first century BC is ruled out, because these letters were only introduced into the Latin alphabet during the reign of Augustus.

Other scholars are content to assume a findless period of a few decades, pushing the date into the early 2nd century. Pedersen (and with him Odenstedt) suggests a period of development of about a century to account for their assumed derivation of the shapes of þ ᚦ and j ᛃ from Latin D and G.

The invention of the script has been ascribed to a single person or a group of people who had come into contact with Roman culture, maybe as mercenaries in the Roman army, or as merchants. The script was clearly designed for epigraphic purposes, but opinions differ in stressing either magical, practical or simply playful (graffiti) aspects. Bæksted 1952, p. 134 concludes that in its earliest stage, the runic script was an "artificial, playful, not really needed imitation of the Roman script", much like the Germanic bracteates were directly influenced by Roman currency, a view that is accepted by Odenstedt 1990, p. 171 in the light of the very primitive nature of the earliest (2nd to 4th century) inscription corpus.

== Rune names ==
Each rune most probably had a name, chosen to represent the sound of the rune itself according to the principle of acrophony.

The Old English names of all 24 runes of the Elder Futhark, along with five names of runes unique to the Anglo-Saxon runes, are preserved in the Old English rune poem, compiled in the 7th century. These names are in good agreement with medieval Scandinavian records of the names of the 16 Younger Futhark runes, and to some extent also with those of the letters of the Gothic alphabet (recorded by Alcuin in the 9th century). Therefore, it is assumed that the names go back to the Elder Futhark period, at least to the 5th century. There is no positive evidence that the full row of 24 runes had been completed before the end of the 4th century, but it is likely that at least some runes had their name before that time.

This concerns primarily the runes used magically, especially the Teiwaz and Ansuz runes, which are taken to symbolize or invoke deities in sequences such as that on the Lindholm amulet (3rd or 4th century).

Reconstructed names in Common Germanic can easily be given for most runes. Exceptions are the þ rune (which is given different names in Anglo-Saxon, Gothic and Scandinavian traditions) and the z rune (whose original name is unknown, and preserved only in corrupted form from Old English tradition). The 24 Elder Futhark runes are:

| Rune | UCS | Trans. | IPA | Proto-Germanic name | Meaning |
|---|---|---|---|---|---|
| f | ᚠ | f | /ɸ/, /f/ | *fehu | "cattle", "wealth" |
| u | ᚢ | u | /u(ː)/ | ?*ūruz | "aurochs" |
| th,þ | ᚦ | þ | /θ/, /ð/ | ?*þurisaz | "giant", "monster" |
| a | ᚨ | a | /a(ː)/ | *ansuz | "god" |
| r | ᚱ | r | /r/ | *raidō | "ride, journey" |
| k | ᚲ | k (c) | /k/ | ?*kauną | "boil" |
| g | ᚷ | g | /ɡ/ | *gebō | "gift" |
| w | ᚹ | w | /w/ | *wunjō | "joy" |
| h | ᚺ ᚻ | h | /h/ | *hagalaz | "hail" |
| n | ᚾ | n | /n/ | *naudiz | "need", "affliction" |
| i | ᛁ | i | /i(ː)/ | *īsaz | "ice" |
| j | ᛃ | j | /j/ | *jēra- | "year", "good year", "harvest" |
| ï,ei | ᛇ | ï (æ) | ?/æː/, /ɨ(ː)/, /ç/, /ji(ː)/ | ?*ī(h)waz | "yew-tree" |
| p | ᛈ | p | /p/ | ?*perþō | Unknown |
| z | ᛉ | z | /z/ | ?*algiz | "elk" (Note: Ralph Elliott suggested in 1980 "protection, defence". However, in 1996 he doesn't bring up either meanings and suggests "sedge" instead. None of these meanings are found in other runologic literature.) |
| s | ᛊ ᛋ | s | /s/ | *sōwilō | "sun" |
| t | ᛏ | t | /t/ | *tīwaz | "Tiwaz" |
| b | ᛒ | b | /b/ | *berkanan | "birch" |
| e | ᛖ | e | /e(ː)/ | *ehwaz | "horse" |
| m | ᛗ | m | /m/ | *mannaz | "man", "human" |
| l | ᛚ | l | /l/ | ?*laguz | "water", "liquid" |
| ŋ | ᛜ | ŋ | /ŋ/ | *ingwaz | "Ing" |
| o | ᛟ | o | /o(ː)/ | *ōþala- | "inheritance", "household" |
| d | ᛞ | d | /d/ | *dagaz | "day" |

==== Notes ====
Each rune derived its sound from the first phoneme of the rune's respective name, with the exception of Ingwaz and Algiz: the Proto-Germanic z sound of the Algiz rune never occurred in a word-initial position. The phoneme acquired an r-like quality in Proto-Norse, usually transliterated with ʀ, and finally merged with r in Icelandic, rendering the rune superfluous as a letter. Similarly, the ng-sound of the Ingwaz rune does not occur word-initially. The names come from the vocabulary of daily life and mythology, some trivial, some beneficent and some inauspicious:

- Mythology: Tiwaz, Thurisaz, Ingwaz, God, Man, Sun.
- Nature and environment: Sun, day, year, hail, ice, lake, water, birch, yew, pear, elk, aurochs.
- Daily life and human condition: Man, need/constraint, wealth/cattle, horse, estate/inheritance, slag/protection from evil, ride/journey, year/harvest, gift, joy, need, ulcer/illness.

== IPA vowels and consonants ==
The following charts show the probable sound values of each rune based upon Proto-Germanic phonology.

| Consonants | Labial | Dental | Alveolar | Palatal | Velar |
| Nasal | ᛗ /m/ | | ᚾ /n/ | | ᛜ /ŋ/ |
| Plosive | ᛈ /p/, ᛒ /b/ | ᛏ /t/, ᛞ /d/ | | | ᚲ /k/, ᚷ /g/ |
| Fricative | ᚠ /ɸ/, ᛒ /β/ | ᚦ /θ/, ᛞ /ð/ | ᛊ ᛋ /s/, ᛉ /z/ | | ᚺ ᚻ /x/, ᚷ /ɣ/ |
| Approximant | | | ᛚ /l/ | ᛃ /j/ | ᚹ /w/ |
| Trill | | | ᚱ /r/ | | |

| Vowels | Front | Back |
| Close | ᛁ /i/ | ᚢ /u/ |
| Close Mid | ᛖ /e/ | ᛟ /o/ |
| Open | | ᚨ /ɑ/ |

ᛇ has been excluded from the table because what its sound might have been is highly disputed. It may have been a diphthong, or it may have been a monophthong falling somewhere within the range of [ɪ] to [æ]. The only certain fact is that it represented a front vowel.

== Inscription corpus ==
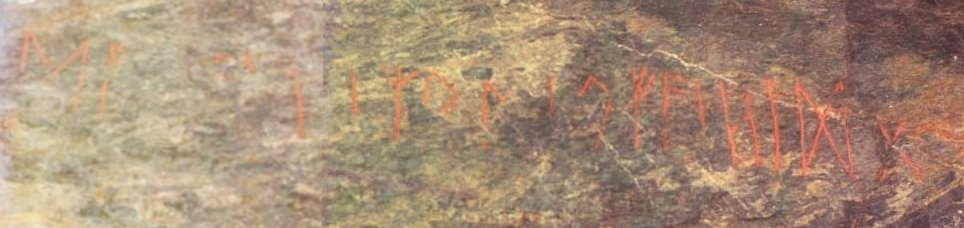
[ek go]dagastiz runo faihido inscription on the 4th century "Einang stone"

Old Futhark inscriptions were found on artifacts scattered between the Carpathians and Lappland, with the highest concentration in Denmark. They are usually short inscriptions on jewelry (bracteates, fibulae, belt buckles), utensils (combs, spinning whorls) or weapons (lance tips, seaxes) and were mostly found in graves or bogs.

=== Scandinavian inscriptions ===
Words frequently appearing in inscriptions on bracteates with possibly magical significance are alu, laþu and laukaz. While their meaning is unclear, alu has been associated with "ale, intoxicating drink", in a context of ritual drinking, and laukaz with "leek, garlic", in a context of fertility and growth. An example of a longer early inscription is on a 4th-century axe-handle found in Nydam, Jutland: wagagastiz / alu:??hgusikijaz:aiþalataz (wagagastiz "wave-guest" could be a personal name, the rest has been read as alu:wihgu sikijaz:aiþalataz with a putative meaning "wave/flame-guest, from a bog, alu, I, oath-sayer consecrate/fight". The obscurity even of emended readings is typical for runic inscriptions that go beyond simple personal names). A term frequently found in early inscriptions is Erilaz, apparently describing a person with knowledge of runes.

The oldest known runic inscription dates to 160 and is found on the Vimose Comb discovered in the bog of Vimose, Funen. The inscription reads harja, either a personal name or an epithet, viz. Proto-Germanic *harjaz (PIE *koryos) "warrior", or simply the word for "comb" (*hārijaz). Another early inscription is found on the Thorsberg chape (200), probably containing the theonym Ullr.

The typically Scandinavian runestones begin to show the transition to Younger Futhark from the 6th century, with transitional examples like the Björketorp or Stentoften stones. In the early 9th century, both the older and the younger futhark were known and used, which is shown on the Rök runestone where the runemaster used both.

The oldest known runestone, the Hole Runestone, dates to the Roman Iron Age, c. 50 BCE–275 CE, and was found as fragments in Ringerike, Norway, during excavations from 2021-2023. The stone features several inscriptions including a name idiberug (possibly idiberun), which could be interpreted as one of several names, including Idibera, Idibergu, or the family name Idiberung. The first three letters of the Elder Futhark, ᚠ (f), ᚢ (u) and ᚦ (th), are also found on the stone, along with a formula naming the writer of the inscription.

The longest known inscription in the Elder Futhark, and one of the youngest, consists of some 200 characters, is found on the Eggjum stone, dated to the early 8th century, and may even contain a stanza of Old Norse poetry.

The Caistor-by-Norwich astragalus reading raïhan "deer" is notable as the oldest inscription of the British Isles, dating to 400, the very end of Roman Britain.

=== Continental inscriptions ===
The oldest inscriptions (before 500) found on the Continent are divided into two groups, the area of the North Sea coast and Northern Germany (including parts of the Netherlands) associated with the Saxons and Frisians on one hand (part of the "North Germanic Koine"), and loosely scattered finds from along the Oder to south-eastern Poland, as far as the Carpathian Mountains (e.g. the ring of Pietroassa in Romania), associated with East Germanic peoples. The latter group disappeared during the 5th century at the time of contact of the Goths with the Roman Empire and their conversion to Christianity.

In this early period, there is no specifically West Germanic runic tradition. This changes from the early 6th century, and for about one century (520 to 620), an Alamannic "runic province" emerges, with examples on fibulae, weapon parts and belt buckles. As in the East Germanic case, use of runes subsides with Christianization, in the case of the Alamanni in the course of the 7th century.

=== Distribution ===
There are some 350 known Elder Futhark inscriptions with 81 known inscriptions from the South (Germany, Austria, Switzerland) and 267 from Scandinavia. The precise numbers are debatable because of some suspected forgeries, and some disputed inscriptions (identification as "runes" vs. accidental scratches, simple ornaments or Latin letters). 133 Scandinavian inscriptions are on bracteates (compared to 2 from the South), and 65 are on runestones (no Southern example is extant). Southern inscriptions are predominantly on fibulae (43, compared to 15 in Scandinavia). The Scandinavian runestones belong to the later period of the Elder Futhark, and initiate the boom of medieval Younger Futhark stones (with some 6,000 surviving examples). As of 2021, one inscription was found in a settlement associated with Slavs.

Elder Futhark inscriptions were rare, with very few active literati, in relation to the total population, at any time, so that knowledge of the runes was probably an actual "secret" throughout the Migration period. Of 366 lances excavated at Illerup, only 2 bore inscriptions. A similar ratio is estimated for Alemannia, with an estimated 170 excavated graves to every inscription found.

Estimates of the total number of inscriptions produced are based on the "minimal runological estimate" of 40,000 (ten individuals making ten inscriptions per year for four centuries). The actual number was probably considerably higher. The 80 known Southern inscriptions are from some 100,000 known graves. With an estimated total of 50,000,000 graves (based on population density estimates), some 80,000 inscriptions would have been produced in total in the Merovingian South alone (and maybe close to 400,000 in total, so that of the order of 0.1% of the corpus has come down to us), and Fischer 2004, p. 281 estimates a population of several hundred active literati throughout the period, with as many as 1,600 during the Alamannic "runic boom" of the 6th century.

=== List of inscriptions ===
After Looijenga 1997, Lüthi 2004.

- Scandinavia
  - Period I (150–550)
    - Hole Runestone (50 BCE–275 CE)
    - Vimose inscriptions (6 objects, 160–300)
    - Øvre Stabu spearhead (c. 180), raunijaz
    - Illerup inscriptions (9 objects)
    - Mos spearhead (c. 300), gaois(?)
    - Golden horns of Gallehus (c. 400)
    - Einang stone (400)
    - Kylver Stone (400)
    - Rö Runestone (400–450)
    - Kalleby Runestone (5th century)
    - Möjbro Runestone (400–550)
    - Järsberg Runestone (500–550)
    - Hogganvik runestone (5th century)
  - Bracteates: total 133 (see also Alu)
    - Seeland-II-C (500)
    - Vadstena bracteate
    - Tjurkö bracteate
  - Period II (550–700)
    - Skåäng Runestone (6th century?)
    - Björketorp Runestone
    - Gummarp Runestone
    - Istaby Runestone
    - Stentoften Runestone
- South-Eastern Europe (200–550): 4 AD.
  - Gothic runic inscriptions (200–350)
- Continental inscriptions (mainly Germany; 200–700): 50 legible, 15 illegible (39 brooches, 11 weapon parts, 4 fittings and belt buckles, 3 strap ends, 8 other)
  - Thorsberg chape (200)
  - Bülach fibula
  - Charnay fibula
  - Nordendorf fibula
  - Pforzen buckle
- English and Frisian (300–700): 44; (see also futhorc)
  - Caistor-by-Norwich astragalus

== Unicode ==
The Elder Futhark is encoded in Unicode within the unified Runic range, 16A0–16FF. Among the freely available TrueType fonts that include this range are Junicode and FreeMono. The Kylver Stone row encoded in Unicode reads:

ᚠᚢᚦᚨᚱᚲᚷᚹᚺᚾᛁᛃᛇᛈᛉᛊᛏᛒᛖᛗᛚᛜᛞᛟ

Encoded separately are the double-barred h-rune, ᚻ and a graphical variant of the ng-rune, ᛝ. These two have separate codepoints because they become independent characters in the Anglo-Saxon futhorc. The numerous other graphical variants of Elder Futhark runes are considered glyph variants better rendered by the use of different fonts and so not given Unicode codepoints. Similarly, bind runes are considered ligatures and not given Unicode codepoints. The only bindrunes that can arguably be rendered as a single Unicode glyph are those that coincidentally look exactly like another rune, e.g. the double ᛚ bindrune is visually identical to ᛏ.

== See also ==
- Rune poem
- Runic script
- Younger Futhark

== Bibliography ==
- Bæksted, A (1952), Målruner og troldruner, Copenhagen.
- Elliott, Ralph Warren Victor (15 January 1981), Runes: An Introduction, Manchester University Press, ISBN 0-7190-0787-9
- Fischer, Svante (2004), "Alemannia and the North — Early Runic Contexts Apart (400–800)", in Naumann, Hans-Peter; Lanter, Franziska; et al. (eds.), Alemannien und der Norden, Berlin: Walter de Gruyter, pp. 266–317, ISBN 3-11-017891-5
- Ilkjær, Jørgen (1996), "Runeindskrifter fra mosefund i Danmark – kontekst og oprindelse", Frisian Runes and Neighbouring Traditions, Rodopi.
- Looijenga, Jantina Helena (1997), Runes around the North Sea and on the Continent AD 150–700 (dissertation), Groningen University.
- Looijenga, Tineke (2004), Texts and Contexts of the Oldest Runic Inscriptions, Leiden: Brill, ISBN 90-04-12396-2
- Lüthi, Katrin (2004), "Von Þruþhild und Hariso: Alemannische und ältere skandinavische Runenkultur im Vergleich", in Naumann, Hans-Peter; Lanter, Franziska; et al. (eds.), Alemannien und der Norden, Berlin: Walter de Gruyter, pp. 318–39, ISBN 3-11-017891-5
- Martin, Max (2004), "Kontinentalgermanische Runeninschriften und 'Alamannische Runenprovinz'", in Naumann, Hans-Peter; Lanter, Franziska; et al. (eds.), Alemannien und der Norden, Berlin: Walter de Gruyter, pp. 165–212, ISBN 3-11-017891-5
- Nowak, Sean (2003), Schrift auf den Goldbrakteaten der Völkerwanderungszeit (PDF) (diss), Göttingen.
- Odenstedt, Bengt (1990), On the Origin and Early History of the Runic Script, Typology and Graphic Variation in the Older Futhark, Uppsala, ISBN 91-85352-20-9.
- Page, Raymond Ian (2005) [1987], Runes, The British Museum Press, ISBN 0-7141-8065-3.
- Rix, Helmut (1997), "Germanische Runen und venetische Phonetik", in Birkmann; et al. (eds.), Vergleichende germanische Philologie und Skandinavistik, Festschrift für Otmar Werner, Tübingen, pp. 231–48, ISBN 3-484-73031-5.
- Robinson, Orrin W (2004), Old English and its Closest Relatives: A Survey of the Earliest Germanic Languages, Routledge, ISBN 0-415-08169-6
- Stifter, David (2010), "Lepontische Studien: Lexicon Leponticum und die Funktion von san im Lepontischen", in Stüber, Karin; et al. (eds.), Akten des 5. Deutschsprachigen Keltologensymposiums. Zürich, 7.–10. September 2009, Wien, pp. 361–76.
- Westergaard, Kai-Erik (1981), Skrifttegn og symboler: noen studier over tegnformer i det eldre runealfabet, Osloer Beiträge zur Germanistik (in Norwegian), vol. 6, Oslo: Germanistisches Institut der Universität Oslo, ISBN 978-82-90389-02-9.
