= Haglaz =

Rune

| Name | Proto-Germanic | Old English | Old Norse | |
|---|---|---|---|---|
| Name | *Hag(a)laz | Hægl | Hagall | |
| Name | "hail" | | | |
| Shape | Elder Futhark | Futhorc | Younger Futhark | |
| Unicode | ᚺ U+16BA / ᚻ U+16BB | | ᚼ U+16BC | ᚽ U+16BD |
| Transliteration | h | | | |
| Transcription | h | | | |
| IPA | [h] | | | |
| Position in rune-row | 9 | | 7 | |

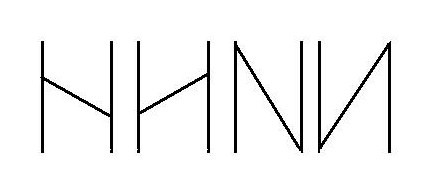
Various forms of the haglaz rune in the Elder Futhark

*Haglaz or *Hagalaz is the reconstructed Proto-Germanic name of the h-rune ᚺ, meaning "hail" (the precipitation).

In the Anglo-Saxon futhorc, it is continued as hægl, and, in the Younger Futhark, as ᚼ hagall. The corresponding Gothic letter is 𐌷 h, named hagl.

The Elder Futhark letter has two variants, single-barred ᚺ and double-barred ᚻ. The double-barred variant is found in continental inscriptions, while Scandinavian inscriptions have exclusively the single-barred variant.

The Anglo-Frisian futhorc in early inscriptions has the Scandinavian single-barred variant. From the 7th century, it is replaced by the continental double-barred variant, the first known instances being found on a Harlingen solidus (ca. 575–625), and in the Christogram on St Cuthbert's coffin.

Haglaz is recorded in all three rune poems:

| Rune Poem: | English Translation: |
| Old Norwegian; Hagall er kaldastr korna; Kristr skóp hæimenn forna. | Hail is the coldest of grain; Christ created the world of old. |
| Old Icelandic; Hagall er kaldakorn ok krapadrífa ok snáka sótt. | Hail is cold grain and shower of sleet and sickness of serpents. |
| Old English; Hægl bẏþ hƿitust corna; hƿẏrft hit of heofones lẏfte, ƿealcaþ hit ƿindes scura; ƿeorþeþ hit to ƿætere sẏððan. | Hail is the whitest of grain; it is whirled from the vault of heaven and is tossed about by gusts of wind and then it melts into water. |

== See also ==
- Bluetooth
- Elder Futhark
- Hagal (Armanen rune)
- Rune poem
