= Runic transliteration and transcription =

Method for analyzing a runic inscription

Runic transliteration and transcription are part of analysing a runic inscription which involves transliteration of the runes into Latin letters, transcription into a normalized spelling in the language of the inscription, and translation of the inscription into a modern language. There is a long-standing practice of formatting transliterations in boldface and transcriptions in Italic type, as the two forms of rendering a runic text have to be kept distinct.

== Overview ==
By not only showing the original inscription, but also transliterating, transcribing and translating, scholars present the analysis in a way that allows the reader to follow their interpretation of the runes. Every step has its challenges, but most Younger Futhark inscriptions are quite easy to interpret. Most Scandinavians can learn to read runic inscriptions with a little training. The Elder Futhark inscriptions, however, are much more challenging and they demand a great deal of knowledge in historical linguistics. Standard works such as Sveriges runinskrifter contain extensive presentations of the ways inscriptions have been interpreted throughout the centuries.

== Runes ==
The a and the þ rune in ligature on the Rök runestone

It is practically impossible to render the runes in all the various ways that they appear in the inscriptions, and so the way they look has to be presented in pictures and in drawings.

== Transliteration ==
Variations of the ansuz rune. They are all transliterated as a.

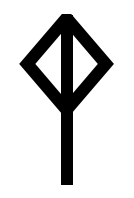
The i ͡ŋ bindrune

Transliteration means that the runes are represented by a corresponding Latin letter in bold. No consideration is given to the sound the rune represented in the actual inscription, and a good example of this is the ansuz rune, which could vary greatly in shape. In the oldest Younger Futhark inscriptions, it always represented a nasal a, as in French an, but later it came to represent other phonemes such as /o/. However, some runemasters continued to use the ansuz rune for an a phoneme. The ansuz rune is always transliterated as o from the Younger Futhark, and consequently, the transliteration mon represents Old Norse man in a runestone from Bällsta, and hon represents Old Norse han in the Frösö Runestone, while forþom represents Old Norse forðom in an inscription from Replösa.

Sometimes the runes are "dotted" which means that a dot has been added, and in transliterations dotted runes are treated differently from ordinary runes. Dotted u, k and i are transliterated as y, g and e though they are rather variations of the non-dotted runes than runes in their own right.

Bind runes are marked with an arch. Some bind runes look in a way that makes it impossible to know which rune preceded the other, and then the scholar has to test the various combinations that give a comprehensible word. Thus all transliterations of bind runes are scholarly interpretations.

Runes that are known from older depictions but that have since disappeared are rendered within square brackets.

== Transcription or normalization ==
The runes are transcribed into normalized spellings of the languages the runes were written in, and normalizations are rendered with italics. Since a single rune may represent several different phonemes, normalizations can differ greatly from transliterations. The þ rune can represent both the Old Norse letter ð (as in English the) or þ (as in English thing).

== See also ==
- List of runestones
- Old Norse orthography
- Runology
