= *Berkanan =

Runic alphabet letter

Name	Proto-Germanic	Old English	Old Norse	
Name	*Berkanan	Beorc/Berc	Bjarkan, Birkal	
Name	"birch"	"birch"/"poplar"?	"birch (lumber)", "birch buds"	
Shape	Elder Futhark	Futhorc	Younger Futhark	
Unicode	ᛒ U+16D2		ᛒ U+16D2	ᛓ U+16D3
Transliteration	b, ƀ		b, p	
Transcription	b			
IPA	[b], [β]		[b], [p]	
Position in rune-row	18		13	

ᛒ is a rune that is transliterated as b or ƀ (β) in the Germanic Elder Futhark and the Anglo-Saxon Futhorc writing systems respectively, and as b or p in the Norse Younger Futhark.

The letter shape is likely directly based on Old Italic 𐌁, whence comes also the Latin letter B.

== Proto-Germanic tradition ==
The reconstructed Proto-Germanic rune name is *berkanan, meaning "birch". While the reconstructed name may have varied historically, the sense of "birch" is uniform across all Runic traditions, including potential derivatives like Irish Ogham, which also uses "birch" for B (Old Irish: Beith).

In Proto-Germanic, including descendants such as Proto-Norse and thereof, the rune could beyond voiced bilabial plosive b also make the phoneme voiced bilabial fricative β (corresponding to bh or ƀ), i.e. a V-esque sound. Compare:

ᛒ as β in Proto-Norse "raven"
Language	Amalgam base		Attested forms
Proto-Norse	*hraƀ(a)naʀ	/hᵃraβᵃnaʀ/	→ ᚺᚨᚱᚨᛒᚨᚾᚨᛉ (harabanaʀ)
Old Norse	*hraƀnʀ	/hraβnʀ/	→ hrabn, hrapn, hrafn, hravn, hramn
Old English	*hraƀ(æ)n	/hraβᵃn/	→ hræfen, hræfn, hrefn, hræmn, hremn, hrem
Old Frisian	*hraƀ(a)n	/hraβᵃn/	→ ravan
Old Dutch	*hraƀ(a)n	/hraβᵃn/	→ ravan
Old Saxon	*hraƀ(a)n	/hraβᵃn/	→ hraƀan, hravan, ravan
Old High German	*hraƀ(a)n	/hraβᵃn/	→ hraban, raban; hram, ram

== Gothic tradition ==
Gothic name
bercna?	*bercha?
*𐌱𐌰𐌹𐍂𐌺𐌰𐌽	*𐌱𐌰𐌹𐍂(𐌹)𐌺𐌰
*baírkan	*bair(i)ka

The Goths used the Elder Futhark for some time before switching to the Gothic alphabet in the 4th century. Like the runic system, they gave corresponding names for all the letters, which for the most part are direct analogs to the rune names, meaning that they most likely ported over the old rune names to their new alphabet. This gives the potentially oldest recorded form of the rune name in the corresponding Gothic letter 𐌱 b, recorded in the late 8th century as bercna by Alcuin of York, which was reconstructed by linguist Adolf Kirchhoff (1826–1908) as the earlier proper form *𐌱𐌰𐌹𐍂𐌺𐌰𐌽 (*baírkan); alternatively it is a misspelling of *bercha, reconstructed by Peter Andreas Munch (1810–1863) as *𐌱𐌰𐌹𐍂𐌹𐌺𐌰 (*bairika), by Kirchhoff as *𐌱𐌰𐌹𐍂𐌺𐌰 (*bairka; cf. Swedish: birka).

== Anglo-Saxon / Old English tradition ==
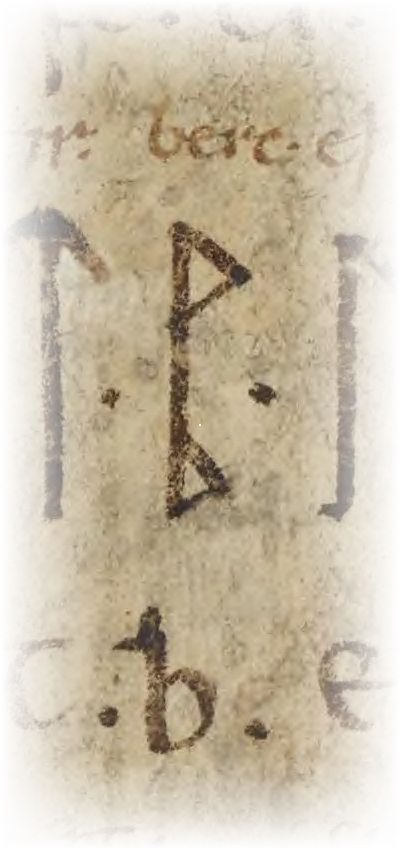
ᛒ (berc) in BL Cotton MS Domitian A IX

The Anglo-Saxon and Old English name is recorded as beorc or berc ("birch" or "poplar"). It is found as early as the 8th century, as featured in the Old English rune poem.

The Old English rune poem goes:

- ᛒ Beorc bẏþ bleda leas, bereþ efne sƿa ðeah
- tanas butan tudder, biþ on telgum ƿlitig,
- heah on helme hrẏsted fægere,
- geloden leafum, lẏfte getenge.

Translation:

- Birch has no fruit, yet it bears nevertheless
- shoots without fruits, is beautiful with branches
- high in its crown, splendidly adorned
- and laden with leaves, pressing up loftily

== Norse tradition ==
In West Norse tradition (Norway, Iceland) the rune is called bjarkan, meaning birch, albeit archaically, as the common form for birch is bjǫrk. The form probably existed in East Norse as well (Denmark, Sweden), as the Old Danish Norse form biercan is found in Codex Leidensis (10th c.).

=== Danish tradition ===
In Denmark, in comparison to Iceland, Norway, and Sweden, no indigenous rune poem is known. Little is preserved of Danish runic tradition, but some runic names are known. As aforementioned, the rune name "bjarkan" is recorded in Danish Old Norse as biercan, as found in Codex Leidensis (10th c.).

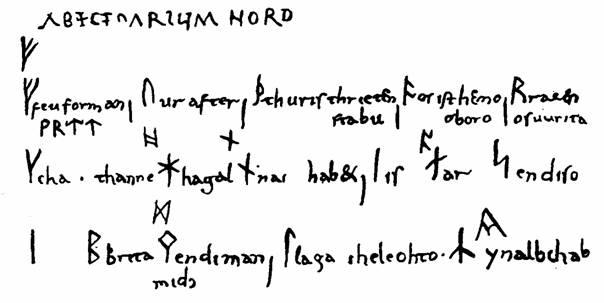
Abecedarium Nordmannicum (10th c.), featuring ᛒ as "brica/briꞇa"

Another Danish name is recorded in Abecedarium Nordmannicum (10th c.), which became largely unreadable in the 19th century due to a failed preservation attempt. A handwritten copy exists from 1826, by Wilhelm Grimm, which has the name written as brica or briꞇa (brita) depending on the assumed identity of the fourth character, either being c or ꞇ (insular t). If "brica" is correct, then a reasonable scenario could be that it is a corruption or misspelling of the name birka. If "brita" is correct, then various theories are possible. For example, Brita is a Nordic shortform for the name Birgitta, which stems from the same root as the Irish pagan goddess Brigid, who is believed to have had the "birch" as her holy tree. Likewise, "Börk", a Nordic dialect form for birch, is recorded as a variation of the given name Brita in Västerbotten and Norrbotten in Sweden.

=== Icelandic tradition ===
In Iceland, the rune is called bjarkan per Norwegian tradition. The Old Icelandic rune poem is partially incomplete, as the original record, AM 687d 4°, is damaged and impossible to make out at parts, such as the bjarkan poem. Many different forms are recorded. A recorded form by Jón Ólafsson of Grunnavík (1732), attributed to either Magnus Olafsson (c. 1573-1636) or a Sveinn a Barði, with Latin translation, reads as:

- ᛒ Bjarkan er litit lim
- ok laufgat tre
- vaxandi vidr

Translation:

- Birch is a small twigged
- and leafy tree
- growing wood

=== Norwegian tradition ===
In Norway, the rune is called bjarkan. The Old Norwegian rune poem goes:

- ᛒ Bjarkan er laufgrønstr líma;
- Loki bar flærða tíma.

Translation:

- Birch has the greenest leaves of any plant-limb;
- Loki bore fortune in his deceit.

=== Swedish tradition ===
In Sweden, the rune is called birkal (also recorded as bÿrkal), with secondary forms like birk or björk (Old Swedish: biørk), birke, and birka.

The suffix -al in Birkal is assumed to be a diminutive or agent suffix or thereof (reconstructed earlier form: *birkil(l) or *bjarkal(l)), meaning "fruit of the tree", "outgrowth", or therearound based on the runic poems (cf. Old High German: eihh-ila, "acorn"; Middle High German: büech-el, "beech nut"). This is supported by its primary Swedish rune kenning, björkbrumar frodast ("birch buds/sprouts most flourishing").

Birk and björk simply mean "birch".

Birke is a forestry term meaning "birch grove" and "birch lumber". Johannes Bureus attested it in 1599 as the name used in the Dalecarlian runic alphabet.

Birka is partly a regional variation of birke, but in Old Norse it also meant "trading center" — see Birk (market place), Bjarkey laws.

There are multiple recorded Swedish rune poems, all of which are short rune kennings. Some shows features of the High to Late Middle Ages and regional variation, with others showing archaic features of unknown older descent, with some select being analog to the Norwegian and Icelandic poems.

The earliest recorded poem was done rather unknowingly by Johannes Bureus in 1599, simply listing them as signific ("meaning") in Latin. An incomplete alternative collection was recorded in a letter by Nicolaus Granius in 1600, and a supplemented third version, more similar to the Bureus collection, was published by Georg Stiernhielm in 1685. Various random forms are also recorded by Olaus Verelius in 1675, found scattered alongside equivalent short forms of the Icelandic poems. Olof Rudbeck the Elder published further recorded forms in his work Atlantica III (1698), which also included poems recorded by Ole Worm in Danicorum Monumentorum (1643), Bureus, and Verelius etc. He cites his new poems from "a Härad-chief Teten", "Professor Ericus Aurivillius" (1643–1702), "Adjunct Johannes Andreae Murich" (1651–1679), and "Petrus Salanus" (1670–1697) and "Nicolaus Jonæ Salanus" (1618–1671).

Swedish kennings
Publisher	Date	Kenning	Translation	Note
Bureus	1599	ᛒᛁᚬᚱᚴᛅ_ᛒᚱᚢᛘᚱ ᚠᚱᚭᚦᛆᛋᛏ; Biörkä-brumr frothast	"Birch buds most flourishing"	Kenning for the name birkal ("birch bud/sprout").
Granius	1600	Biörkahúltet grönast	"The birch grove greenest"	Kenning for the name birke ("birch grove/lumber").
Verelius	1675	Biarks brumur frodast norm. Björks brummar frodast	"Birch's buds most flourishing"	Kenning for the name birkal ("birch bud/sprout").
Verelius	1675	Biark lunda fegurd norm. Björklunda fagert	"Birch grove fair" (Note: By theme "lunda" is read as Swedish: lund ("grove"), but it could also be the adverb lunda, giving the reading: "Birch be, in a way, fair", which potentially could be a kenning for the name björk ("birch")?)	Kenning for the name birke ("birch grove/lumber").
Stiernhielm	1685	Biörkbrumar frodast;	"Birch buds most flourishing;	Kenning for the name birkal ("birch bud/sprout").
Stiernhielm	1685	Biörkeskog grönast, i.e. bäst til Wärke	Birch forest greenest, i.e. best (material) for working"	Kenning for the name birke ("birch grove/lumber").
Rudbeck	1698	Biorken håltune grönast norm. Björken hultene grönast	"Of the birch, the grove greenest"	Kenning for the name birke ("birch grove/lumber").
Rudbeck	1698	Biorke lunde grön norm. Björkelunde grön	"Birch grove green"	Kenning for the name birke ("birch grove/lumber").
Rudbeck	1698	Baldur byter fä	"Balder trades livestock/possessions"? (Note: The given translation is based on Rudbeck's second exegesis, otherwise every word have several possible historical meanings in regards to the theme. The poem features alliteration, and the last word fä ("livestock") may hypothetically have been a third alliteration in some regard: *Balder byter bä ("Balder trading baa", the sound of a sheep)?)	Kenning for the name birka ("trading center")?
Rudbeck	1698	Biork brumar frodast (Verel.)	"Birch buds most flourishing"	Kenning for the name birkal ("birch bud/sprout").
Rudbeck	1698	Bonden beter best	"Farmer bates best"?	See Rudbeck's second exegesis (below).
Rudbeck	1698	Biarkan er lauf grenst lima. (Worm.)	"Birch has the greenest leaves of any plant-limb"	The Norwegian poem.

Rudbeck (1698) also gives three unspecified "exegeses" to the kennings:

Rudbeck's exegeses	Translation
Biörken holtune grönast / är skapnad paslig skön O huru önska alla / att biörken blifwer grön.	"The birch grove is the greenest, it is beautifully shaped Oh how everyone wishes, that the birch becomes green."
Detta åhr blifwer Löfskogen skön för att bryta Löf åth Söderna / och alla som gå till tingz / winna något till bytes / och är ett godt Tingz åhr.	"This year the deciduous forest will be nice for gathering leaves for the livestock, and everyone who goes to the thing assembly will win something as a trade, and it will be a good thing year."
Detta åhr gifwer och godt Wärkie att hugga.	"This year gives and good work lumber to shop."

== Norse p-rune (Plástr) ==
Name	Old Norse	
Name	stunginn ᛒ	opin ᛒ, Plástr
Name	"stung ᛒ"	"open ᛒ", "Bandage"
Unicode	ᛔ U+16D4	ᛕ U+16D5
Transliteration	p	
Transcription	p	
IPA	[p]	
Position in rune-row	*13	

The Norse ᛒ rune primarily stood for /b/, but also represented /p/. In the Early Medieval period, various improvements were made to the Norse runic system in order to make it easier to write with, leading to some proper p-runes. Such generally lacked its own name, but have at times been referred to as Plástr ("bandage").

=== ᛔ Stung Bjarkan/Birkal ===
A stung version of Bjarkan/Birkal ᛔ appeared in the 12th century (Old West Norse: stunginn Bjarkan; Old Swedish: stungen Birkal), meant to indicate that the rune made a /p/ sound.

=== ᛕ Open Bjarkan/Birkal ===
The stung version of the Bjarkan/Birkal ᛔ was complex to carve, leading to a simplified modification ᛕ where the loops were opened, leading to the "open Bjarkan/Birkal".

=== ᛒ Turned Bjarkan/Birkal ===
In Norse Medieval writing, the ᛒ was sometimes mirrored ᛒ to represent /p/ instead of /b/. Such runes are recorded in Early Modern Swedish as being called "turned runes" (vändrunor). A potential name could be *Birkal-vänd ("ᛒ turned") based on other recorded rune names.

== See also ==
- Beith (letter)
- Bluetooth
- Elder Futhark
- Loki
- Rune poem
