= Rune poem =

Literary form

Rune poems are proverbial mnemonic kennings that list the letters of runic alphabets while providing an explanatory poetic stanza for each letter. Four different poems from before the mid-20th century have been preserved: the Anglo-Saxon Rune Poem, the Norwegian Rune Poem, the Icelandic Rune Poem and the Swedish Rune Poem. Note that the singularis term "rune poem" is a bit anachronistic, as there exist several variations of the Icelandic, and Swedish poems, etc.

The Icelandic and Norwegian poems list 16 Younger Futhark runes, while the Anglo-Saxon Rune Poem lists 29 Anglo-Saxon runes. Each poem differs in poetic verse, but they contain numerous parallels between one another. Further, the poems provide references to figures from Norse and Anglo-Saxon paganism, the latter included alongside Christian references. A list of rune names is also recorded in the Abecedarium Nordmannicum, a 9th-century manuscript, but whether this can be called a poem or not is a matter of some debate.

The rune poems have been theorized as having been mnemonic devices that allowed the user to remember the order and names of each letter of the alphabet and may have been a catalog of important cultural information, memorably arranged; comparable with the Old English sayings, Gnomic poetry, and Old Norse poetry of wisdom and learning. The Swedish poems features some clear neologisms for later sound developments, like replacing os ("inlet") with oos ("fumes") for the o-rune ᚯ, as the primary sound for o in Middle Norse became [uː] instead of [oː].

== Old English Rune Poem ==
The Old English Rune Poem as recorded was likely composed in the 7th century and was preserved in the 10th-century manuscript Cotton Otho B.x, fol. 165a – 165b, housed at the Cotton library in London, England. In 1731, the manuscript was lost with numerous other manuscripts in a fire at the Cotton library. However, the poem had been copied by George Hickes in 1705 and his copy has formed the basis of all later editions of the poems.

George Hickes' record of the poem may deviate from the original manuscript. Hickes recorded the poem in prose, divided the prose into 29 stanzas, and placed a copper plate engraved with runic characters on the left-hand margin so that each rune stands immediately in front of the stanza where it belongs. For five of the runes (wen, hægl, nyd, eoh, and Ing) Hickes gives variant forms and two more runes are given at the foot of the column; cweorð and an unnamed rune (calc) which are not handled in the poem itself. A second copper plate appears across the foot of the page and contains two more runes: stan and gar.

Van Kirk Dobbie states that this apparatus is not likely to have been present in the original text of the Cotton manuscript and states that it's possible that the original Anglo-Saxon rune poem manuscript would have appeared similar in arrangement of runes and texts to that of the Norwegian and Icelandic rune poems.

== Old Icelandic Rune Poem ==
The Icelandic Rune Poem is recorded in four Arnamagnæan manuscripts, the oldest of the four dating from around 1500. The Icelandic Rune Poem has been called the most systemized of the rune poems (including the Abecedarium Nordmannicum) and has been compared to the ljóðaháttr verse form. In early runology it is referred to as "divided into three" (Icelandic: þrídeilur, Early Modern Swedish: tridelorne, Latin: trideilum).

The Icelandic Rune Poem is not standardised, and the two earliest records, AM 687 d 4° (c. 1500) and AM 461 12° (c. 1550), showcase differences from one another. Other variations have also been documented later on, and Olaus Verelius showcased some short-form variants in 1675, similar in length to the Swedish rune poems. Jón Ólafsson of Grunnavík recorded a form in 1732, attributed to either Magnus Olafsson (c. 1573-1636) or a Sveinn a Barði, with Latin translations.

=== AM 687 d 4° ===
The oldest recorded Icelandic rune poem is found in the manuscript AM 687 d 4° (c. 1500). This it is the most popular basis for modern normalizations of the Icelandic rune poem. However, AM 687d 4° is damaged and impossible to make out at parts, leaving some bits as guesswork which varies between sources. Especially ᚿ Nauð (n), ᛆ Ár (a), ᛒ Bjarkan (b) and ᛦ Ýr (ʀ) are effected. British historian and runologist R. I. Page discussed this in detail in his publication "The Icelandic rune poem" (1999).

R. I. Page transcribed AM 687 d 4° (hereafter = A), text: f. Iv, 11. 1-16. (Plate 1), as the following. He gives the following notes for the transcription:

Abbreviated words/syllables are rendered in italic (which cannot be more than a general indication since the scribe was inconsistent in writing out the forms of some endings). Letters and groups which the scribe omitted in error or through lack of space are supplied within angled brackets < >. Letter sequences that cannot now be identified are inserted, for convenience of reading, within square brackets [ ], on the evidence either of the available space or of related texts. Such added readings have, of course, little authority for the A version of the poem. The convention [....] indicates that the reading cannot be supplied with any conviction, and merely suggests very roughly how many graphs are lost. It is not always easy to distinguish certain spelling conventions in the manuscript - whether u or v, d or d is intended, for instance. In such cases I have perhaps rather arbitrarily chosen one graph or the other. It is sometimes hard to determine whether the scribe intended a space between adjacent words or not, and again my practice here is inevitably arbitrary. Stops (raised points, colons) are not always easy to distinguish from chance marks on the parchment surface. Rune forms are here given their conventional transliterations in bold characters.

AM 687 d 4° (c. 1500) transcribed by R. I. Page (Note: Italics are annoted letters.)
#	Rune	Poem	Kenning
1	ᚠ	**f** er frænda rog ok flædar viti ok g[ra]fseids gata	Aurum fy<l>ker
2	ᚢ	**u** er skygia gratur ok skæra þuer[rir ok] hirdis hatr	Vmbre • Visi
3	ᚦ	**þ** er kuenna kuǫl ok kleita ibui ok [..]lrunar veʀ	Sat[ur]nus. þeingill
4	ᚮ	**o** er alldingautr ok asg[ar]dz iof[ur ok v]alhallar visi	Jupi[ter] Oddviti
5	ᚱ	**r** er sitiandi sela ok snudig ferd ok iors erfidi	Ite<r> • Ræsir
6	ᚴ	**k** er barna baul ok bardagi ok h[o]ldfuahus.	Flag[...] [k]ongur
7	ᚼ	**h** er kallda [k]orn ok knap[a dri]fa ok snaka sott.	G[ran]do Hilldingr
8	ᚿ	**n** er þyiar þra [ok........] kost[r] ok v[o]ssamlig verk.	Opera Niflungr
9	ᛁ	**i** er aʀ baur[k]r [ok un]nar þ[e] kia ok feigra manna far.	Gl[a]cies jofur
10	ᛆ	**a** er gumna g[.]d[. ...........]ok d[a]ladreyri.	Annus Allvalldr
11	ᛋ	**s** er s[k]yia skiolldr [ok sk]inandi raudull ok isa alldrtregi.	Rota: Siklin<gr>
12	ᛚ	**l** [er] vellanda va[..] ok [..]dr ket[i]ll ok glaummunga grandi.	Iacus Lofd<ungr>
13	ᛒ	**b** er[..................]ok litid tre ok u[.]gsamligr uidr	Abies. Budlungr
14	ᛘ	**m** er manns g[a]man ok molldar auki ok skipa skreytir.	Homo Milldingr
15	ᛐ	**t** er [ein]hendr [a]s ok vlfsleifar ok hofa hilmir.	Mars • Tiggi
16	ᛦ	**y** er ben[....................]otgiarnt jarn	Arcus ynglingr

A variation of the Icelandic rune poem is shown below, with English translation side-by-side from Dickins (1915), with slight corrections. Red markers indicates guesswork or other alterations from R. I. Page's transcription above.

#	Rune	Name	Old Icelandic	English
1	ᚠ	Fé (livestock, loose wealth, gold)	Fé er frænda róg ok flæðar viti ok grafseiðs gata	Wealth = source of discord among kinsmen and beacon of the flow (river) and path of the serpent.
2	ᚢ	Úr (bad precepitation)	Úr er skýja grátr ok skára þverrir ok hirðis hatr.	Bad precepitation = lamentation of the clouds and ruin of the hay-harvest and the shepherd's hatred .
3	ᚦ	Þurs (giant, troll, demon)	Þurs er kvenna kvöl ok kletta búi ok varðrúnar verr.	Giant = torture of women and dweller of cliffs and husband of a giantess.
4	ᚬ	Óss (Æsir)	Óss er aldingautr ok ásgarðs jöfurr, ok valhallar vísi.	Æsir = Elder Gautr and head of Asgard and lord of Valhall.
5	ᚱ	Reið (ride, riding)	Reið er sitjandi sæla ok snúðig ferð ok jórs erfiði.	Riding = joy of the mounted (the horsemen) and speedy journey and toil of the steed.
6	ᚴ	Kaun (ulcer)	Kaun er barna böl ok bardaga [för] ok holdfúa hús.	Ulcer = children's woe and painful spot and abode of mortification.
7	ᚼ	Hagall (hail)	Hagall er kaldakorn ok krapadrífa ok snáka sótt.	Hail = cold grain and shower of sleet and sickness of serpents.
8	ᚾ	Nauð (need, distress, constraint)	Nauð er Þýjar þrá ok þungr kostr ok vássamlig verk.	Constraint = grief of the bond-maid and state of oppression and toilsome work.
9	ᛁ	Íss (ice)	Íss er árbörkr ok unnar þak ok feigra manna fár.	Ice = bark of rivers and roof of the wave and destruction of the doomed.
10	ᛅ	Ár (year = yearly harvest)	Ár er gumna góði ok gott sumar algróinn akr.	Plenty = boon to men and good summer and thriving crops.
11	ᛋ	Sól (sun)	Sól er skýja skjöldr ok skínandi röðull ok ísa aldrtregi.	Sun = shield of the clouds and shining ray and destroyer of ice.
12	ᛏ	Týr (Tyr)	Týr er einhendr áss ok ulfs leifar ok hofa hilmir.	Tyr = god with one hand and leavings of the wolf and prince of temples.
13	ᛒ	Bjarkan (birch)	Bjarkan er laufgat lim ok lítit tré ok ungsamligr viðr.	Birch = leafy twig and little tree and fresh young shrub.
14	ᛘ	Maðr (man)	Maðr er manns gaman ok moldar auki ok skipa skreytir.	Man = delight of man and augmentation of the earth and adorner of ships.
15	ᛚ	Lögr (whelving water body)	Lögr er vellanda vared ok viðr ketill ok glömmungr grund.	Whelving water body = welling water (eddying stream) and wide kettle (pool) and land of the fish.
16	ᛦ	Ýr (yew)	Ýr er bendr bogi ok brotgjarnt járn ok fífu fárbauti.	Yew = bent bow and brittle iron and giant of the arrow.

== Old Norwegian Rune Poem ==
The Norwegian Rune Poem was preserved in a 17th-century copy of a destroyed 13th-century manuscript. The Norwegian Rune Poem is preserved in skaldic metre, featuring the first line exhibiting a "(rune name)(copula) X" pattern, followed by a second rhyming line providing information somehow relating to its subject.

== Swedish Rune Poem ==
There are multiple recorded Swedish rune poems, all of which are short rune kennings. Some appears to be later Medieval creations pertaining to sound changes, while others show archaic features of unknown older descent. A select few are cognate to the Norwegian and Icelandic poems, and some others appear regional. Some of the kennings are classic proverbs or riddles, thus appearing standalone in other material as well. The poem for ᛁ is ("ice") is a common proverb or riddle, stating that "the ice is the broadest bridge". The poem for ᚾ nödh ("need, distress, constraint") is found as a proverb in the 14th century: nødh ær iw enga koster ("need is of no choice"), i.e. when forced, you only have one choice, later appearing in the 17th century as: noͤdhen aͤr eenda kost ("need is the only choice").

The earliest recorded poem was done rather unknowingly by Johannes Bureus in 1599, simply listing them as "signific" in Latin. An incomplete alternative collection was recorded in a letter by Nicolaus Granius in 1600 (although not published until 1908), and a supplemented third version, more similar to the Bureus collection, was published by Georg Stiernhielm in 1685. Various anachronistic forms are also recorded by Olaus Verelius in 1675, found scattered alongside some equivalent short forms of the Icelandic poems. Olof Rudbeck the Elder published further recorded forms in his work Atlantica III (1698), which also included poems recorded by Ole Worm in Danicorum Monumentorum (1643), Bureus, and Verelius etc. He cites his new poems from "a Härad-chief Teten", "Professor Ericus Aurivillius" (1643–1702), "Adjunct Johannes Andreae Murich" (1651–1679), and "Petrus Salanus" (1670–1697) and "Nicolaus Jonæ Salanus" (1618–1671).

The Swedish poems are understudied and have received relatively little attention from runologists.

=== Bureus rune poems ===
In the late 16th century, pioneer runologist and mystic Johannes Bureus traveled around Sweden and researched runic lore (by 1646, he and his assistants had recorded more than 650 runic inscriptions in Sweden). Bureus had learnt to read runes in 1594 by studying a runestone which was fitted as a stepping stone in the Riddarholmen Church in Stockholm. Five years later (1599), he had gathered enough knowledge to publish his first runological work, a copper-plate print, called Runakänslånäs läräspån (ᚱᚢᚾᛆᚴᛅᚿᛋᛚᚮᚾᛅᛋ ᛚᛅᚱᛅ_ᛋᛔᚮᚿ, roughly "first attempt at runic instruction"), also known as "Bureus' Runic Tablet" (Swedish: Bureus runtavla). It was intended as a teaching tool in runic knowledge, and contains examples of different runic alphabets, runic forms and runestone texts, and explanations of the meaning of the runes, a work which was highly regarded and widely used by other researchers in the field of runology.

On said print, he lists runic poems for each rune. These poems are written in his own runic standard, which cannot be properly displayed in unicode. Bureus later refined his standard in his runic textbook Runa ABC, and this does align with unicode, and the poems below have been rendered in this standard. Transliterations have been rendered in the modern Swedish alphabet.

#	Rune	Given names	Given poems	Translations
1	ᚠ	ᚠᛅ Fä (livestock), (Note: cf. Old East Norse: Fǣ, Old West Norse: Fé, for ᚠ) ᚠᚤᚱ Fyr (?), (Note: The Swedish rune name Fyr is attested by Olaus Petri around 1525, and as ᚠᛁᚱ (Fir) 1419 on runic inscription G 306. Possibly a corruption of Freyr; compare Granius spelling: Fÿr = Fijr (F(r)ijr?), where ÿ is a ligature of ij. Compare the historical Svealand name for Freyr: Old Swedish: Frø, Early Modern Swedish: Frö (cf. Swedish: frö, "seed"). Another idea could be Swedish: fyr, "fire".) ᚠᚱᚤᚼ Frygh^{?} (Frigg)	ᚠᛅᚴᛚᛅ ᚠᚱᛅᚿᛑ_ᚱᚭ fäklä f͡ränd-ro	–
2	ᚢ	ᚢᚱ Ur (bad precipitation)	ᚢᛦ ᛁ ᚢᛅᛋᛏᛆᚿ ᚢᛅᚧᚱ ur i västa͡n vädhr	bad precipitation in weastern weather
3	ᚦ	ᚦᚭᚱᛋ Thors (jötunn/troll/demon)	ᚦᚭᚱᛋ ᚴᚢᛁᚿᚿᛆ_ᚴᚢᛮ tors kvinna-kva͡l	Jötunn, woman's pain
4	ᚭ	ᚭᚧᛅᛋ Odhäs	ᛚᚽᚴᚱ ᚭᛋ ᛁ ᚢᛁᚧᛁᛅ lekr os i vidhiä (Note: Swedish: vidje)	Leaks?/Plays? ooze in withy? (Note: A similar sounding poem also recorded is Os i varje å; "Inlet in every river", ie, every river has an inlet.)
5	ᚱ	ᚱᚽᚧᚱ Redhr (ride, rider, riding)	ᚱᛁᛐᛐᚮᛦ ᛁ ᚼᛅᛋᛏᛅ_ᛋᛒᚱᚮᚿᚵ rittår i hästä-språng	rider? in horse-sprint
6	ᚴ	ᚴᚯᚿ Kön (ulcer), ᚴᛆᚼᚿ Kaghn (pillory) (Note: Swedish: kåk)	ᚴᚬᚾ ᛁ ᚴᚬᛏᛅ ᚤᛅᚱᛋᛏᛆ kön i kjöte värsta	ulcer in flesh worst
7	ᚼ	ᚼᛆᚼᛮ Haga͡l (hail)	ᚼᛆᚱᚢᛮ ᛁ ᛒᚭ ᛒᛅᛋᛏᛆ ha͡rva͡l (Note: Swedish: hårdvall) i bo bäst	hard dry ground?, best in home
8	ᚿ	ᚾᚮᚧ Nådh, ᚾᚯᚧ Nödh, ᚾᚭᚧᚱ Nodh͡r (need, distress, constraint)	ᚾᚬᚧ ᚽᚿᛑ ᚴᚮᛋᛏ nödh end kåst	need only choice
9	ᛁ	ᛁᛋ Is (ice), ᛁᚧᚱ idhr, ᛁᚱ ir (?) (Note: Straight forward sense would be Old Swedish: idher, Swedish: ider, cf. Norwegian: ir ("repentance"), from Old Norse: iðr ("bowel, repentance"). However, there is no clear reason why such names would be coined in relation to sound changes, or derived from existing senses (cf. the rune names óss = Odin, later turned to ōdh = rage, first element in Odhin). A possibility is that idhr and ir are surviving Old East Norse forms of the West Norse rune name ýr ("yew") for ᛦ, which is otherwise not recorded whatsoever in Swedish. cf. Swedish: idegran ("yew-spruce"), historical forms: id, iidh, ijdh (= ÿdh), yd, ydh.)	ᛁᛋᛒᚱᚭ ᛒᚱᚽᚦᛆᛋᛏ isbro brethast	ice-bridge broadest
10	ᛆ	ᛆᚱ Å͡r, ᛆᚱᛋ Å͡rs (year, yearly growth)	ᚮᚱᛅ ᛒᛚᛆᚦ årä blath	yearly leaf
11	ᛋ	ᛋᚭᛚ Sol (sun)	ᛋᚭᛚ ᚴᚿᛅᛒᚬᚼ sol knäbögh (Note: Swedish: knäböj)	sun knee-bend
12	ᛏ	ᛏᛁᚧᚱ Tidhr (time), ᛏᚤᚱ Tyr (Tyr)	ᛏᛁᚧᚱ ᚢᛁᛐᚱᚢᛘ ᛚᛁᚧᛆᛋᛏ tidhr vit͡rum lidhast	time is the worst for the wise (Note: Bureus might have missed an n, as Stiernhielm's poem says Tider wintrom ledast, "The time around winter is the worst".)
13	ᛒ	ᛒᛁᚱᚴᛮ Birka͡l (birch-bud), ᛒᛁᚯᚱᚴ Biörk (birch)	ᛒᛁᚬᚱᚴᛅ_ᛒᚱᚢᛘᚱ ᚠᚱᚭᚦᛆᛋᛏ biörka-brumr frodhast	birch-buds most flourishing
14	ᛚ	ᛚᛆᚼᚱ Laghr (law)	ᛚᛆᚼ ᛚᛆᚿᛏᛋᛅᚱᛆ lagh la͡ntsära	law, lands-honor
15	ᛘ	ᛘᛆᚧᚱ Madhr (man)	ᛘᛆᚼᚱ ᛘᚢᛚ_ᚮᚴᚱ maghr mul-åkr	meager mulch-field?
16	ᛦ	ᛋᛏᚢᛔᛅᛘᛆᚧᚱ Stupämadher (stoop-ᛘ)	ᚭᛦᛘᛆᚼᚱ ᛏᛁᚿᚵᛋ_ᚬᚴᚱ ormaghr (Note: Swedish: örmager → negation prefix + måger ("man")?, unclear sense) tings-ökr	–
17	ᛮ	ᛆᚱ-ᛚᛆᚼᚱ Å͡r-Laghr (year-law)	ᚮᚡ_ᛚᛆᚼᛅᚦ åv-laghäth (Note: Swedish: avlagt)	absolved
18	ᛯ	ᛏᚢᚽᛋᛚᚢᚿᚵᛅᚿ_ᛘ Tveslungän ᛘ (two-slung ᛘ)	ᛏᚢᚽᛘᚮᚼᚱ tvemåghr	twin son-in-law
19	ᛰ	ᛒᛅᛚᚼ_ᚦᚭᚱᛋ Bälgh-Thors (bellow ᚦ)	ᚦᚭᚱᛋ ᛒᛅᛚᚼᛒᚢᚿᛑᚿ thors bälghbundn	ᚦ bulge-bound

=== Granius rune poems ===
In 1600, Swedish-German mathematician Nicolaus Granius (1569–1631) collected a number of Swedish rune poems in a letter. The text was originally sent by Granius as a student to Bonaventura Vulcanius, and claimed to have ”learned it from the old rustics” (a senibus rusticis didici). It was first published in 1908 by Philipp Christiaan Molhuysen, using roughly the orthography below. A modern edition was published in 1987.

Granius recorded poems for 14/16 runes, lacking poems for ᛘ (m) and ᛦ (ʀ), the last two runes in the Swedish Medieval Futhark order. Beyond poems, Granius also listed various names for the runes. The names and poems do not follow the exact same order – rune name order: f u þ o r k h n i t a b s l m ʀ; poem order: f u þ o r ~~b~~ k h n i t a s l. Below, the order is normalized according to the Swedish medieval futhark order, since Granius' orders appears non important. Translations and transliterations have been slightly corrected based on the original letter. Alliteration is marked in bold.

#	Rune	Given names	Given poems	Translations
1	ᚠ	Fÿr (?), Faͤ (livestock)	**F**aͤ **f**raͤnde ro	Livestock, kinsmen's calm? (Note: Possibly an archaic form cognate to the Icelandic poem.)
2	ᚢ	Ŭr (bad precipitation)	Ŭr**v**aͤder **v**aͤrst	Bad precipitation weather worst
3	ᚦ	Tors (jötunn/troll/demon)	Tors **q**ŭinne **q**ŭāl	Jötunn, woman's pain
4	ᚬ	Ōs (river-mouth)	**Ō**s i hvario **å**	River-mouth in every river
5	ᚱ	Ridher (ride, rider, riding)	Ridher haͤstespraͤng	Ride horse-run
6	ᚴ	Koͤn (ulcer), Kaͤrast (dearest), Kaŭgven (pillory)	**K**oͤn i **k**oͤte vaͤrst	Ulcer in flesh worst
7	ᚼ	Hagal, Hagaller (hail)	Hagaller i **b**o **b**aͤst	Hail, best in home
8	ᚾ	Noͤdh (need, distress, constraint)	Noͤdh aͤr enda kŭst	Need is only choice
9	ᛁ	Īs (ice)	Īs**b**ro **b**redast	Ice-bridge broadest
10	ᛅ	År (year, yearly growth)	År i bladhe vidast	Yearly growth in leaf widest
11	ᛋ	Sōl (sun)	Sōl i **h**imbla **h**oͤgast	Sun in heaven highest
12	ᛏ	Tÿr (torch-wood), (Note: Swedish: töre, tyre. Bureus recorded the name Tyri with the sense "tar torch", solving the poem.) Tÿf (thief)	Tÿr i vatŭm ledast, Tÿva raͤtten ledast	Torch-wood in water worst, Thief in justice worst
13	ᛒ	Birka (birch-grove), Bÿrkal (birch-bud)	~~bioͤrkahŭltet groͤnast~~ (Note: Scratched in the original.)	birch-grove greenest
14	ᛚ	Lagh (law)	**L**agh aͤr **L**andsens aͤra	Law is land's honour
15	ᛘ	Madher (man)	(missing)	–
16	ᛦ	Oͤvermagi (inability)	(missing)	–

Similar names of runes are given in a paper found in Norway, dated 18th century. The paper has no poems, but only the names of the runes written in Danish. The paper contains also a Hebrew word Migdol, probably referring to the Runic alphabet.

== Abecedarium Nordmannicum ==
Recorded in the 9th century, the Abecedarium Nordmannicum is the earliest known catalog of Norse rune names, though it does not contain definitions, is partly in Continental Germanic and also contains an amount of distinctive Anglo-Saxon rune types. The text is recorded in Codex Sangallensis 878, kept in the St. Gallen abbey, and may originate from Fulda, Germany.

== The Rune Poem Puzzle from the Old Bø Church ==
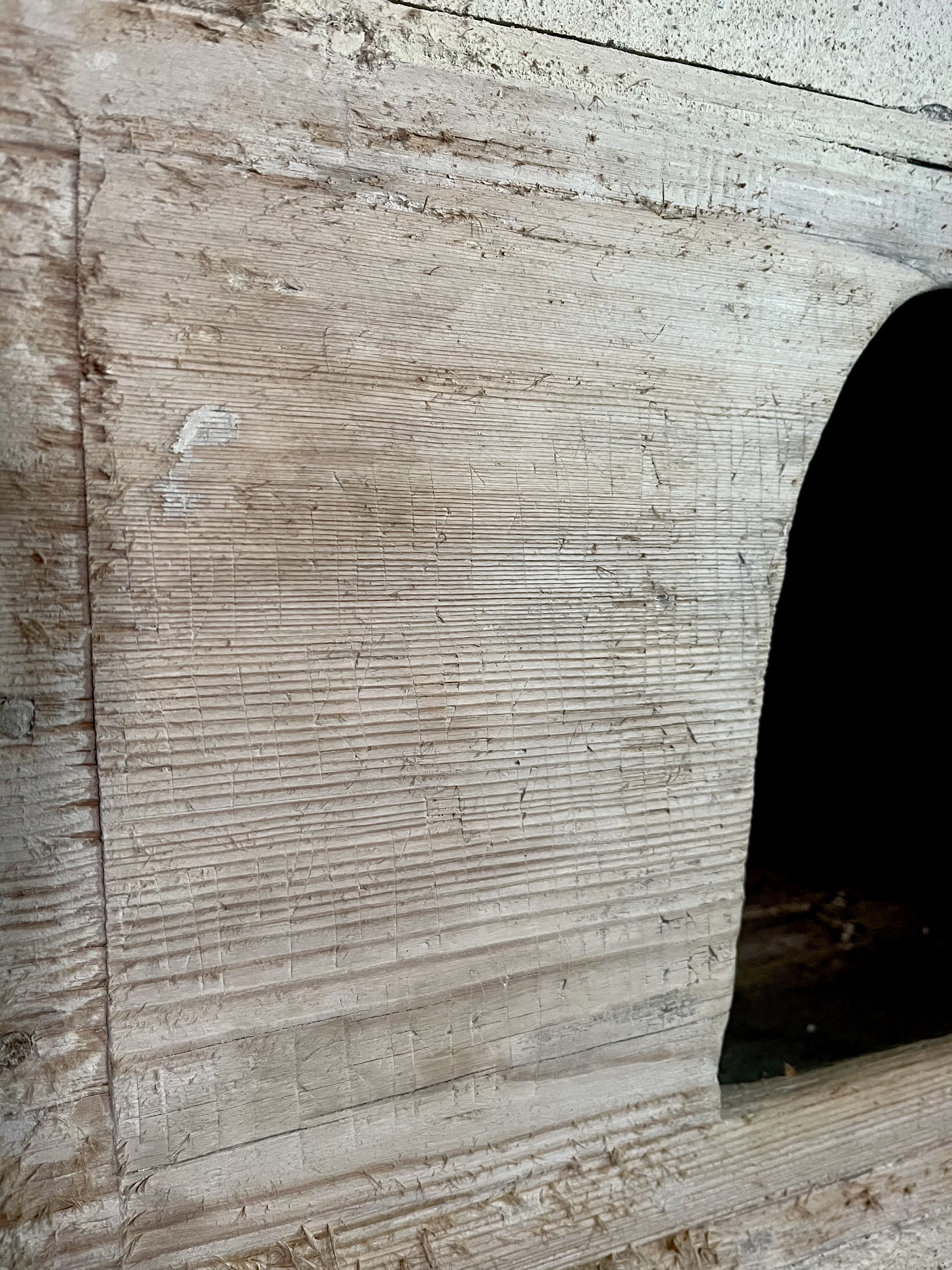
The Runic Puzzle from Bø

In the Old Bø Church in Telemark a 12th century runic inscription is preserved which uses kennings for runes very similar to the rune poems. Reading the lines from the bottom up and resolving the kennings one gets the name of the woman with whom the rune-carver was in love.

Original runes

ᛋᚢᛅᚠᚿᛒᛆᚿᛆᚱᛘᛂᚱ ᛬ ᛌᚮᛏᛂᚱᛒᚿᛆ
ᚠᛁᚮᚿᛌᚠᛁᚿᚴᛆᛏᛆ ᛬ ᚠᛁᛆᛚᛌᛁᛒᚢᛁ
ᚼᛂᛋᛏᛅᚱᚠᛆᚦᛁ ᛬ ᚯᚢᚴᚼᚢᚼᛁᛌᚼᚢᛁᛏᛁ ᛬
ᚦᚱᛚᛌᚢᚿᛌᛅᛚᛆ ᛬ ᚦᛏᛌᚴᛚᚢᚱᛆᚦᛆ

Normalization

Svefn bannar mér, sótt er barna,
fjón svínkanda, fjalls íbúi,
hests ærfaði, auk høys víti,
þræls vansæla. Þat skulu ráða!

Translation

What prevents me from sleeping is sickness of children,
hatred of workmen, dweller in the mountain,
toil of the horse and harm of the hay,
misfortune of the slave. This must be interpreted!

Resolving the kennings the reader gets the following runes:

ᚴ	k	G	kaun	‘boil, ulcer’	(sickness of children)
ᚢ	u	ū	úrr	‘(bad) precipitation’	(hatred of workmen)
ᚦ	þ	ð	þurs	‘troll/jötun’	(dweller in the mountain)
ᚱ	r	r	reið	‘ride, wagon’	(toil of the horse)
ᚢ	u	u	úrr	‘(bad) precipitation’	(harm of the hay)
ᚿ	n	n	nauðr	‘need, distress, constraint’	(misfortune of the slave)

Together they spell out the name Gudrun.

== See also ==
- Bríatharogam
- Gothic alphabet
- List of runestones
- Runic magic
- Apple Pie ABC
- Alphabet song
