= Staveless runes =

Simplified symbols used in later runic alphabets

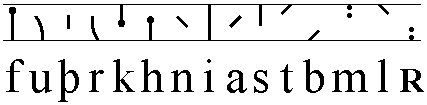
Staveless runes.

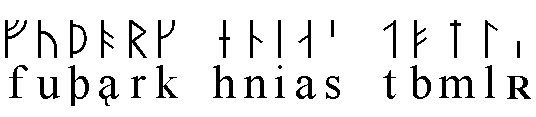
Short-twig runes, one of the two main types of the Younger Futhark, for comparison.

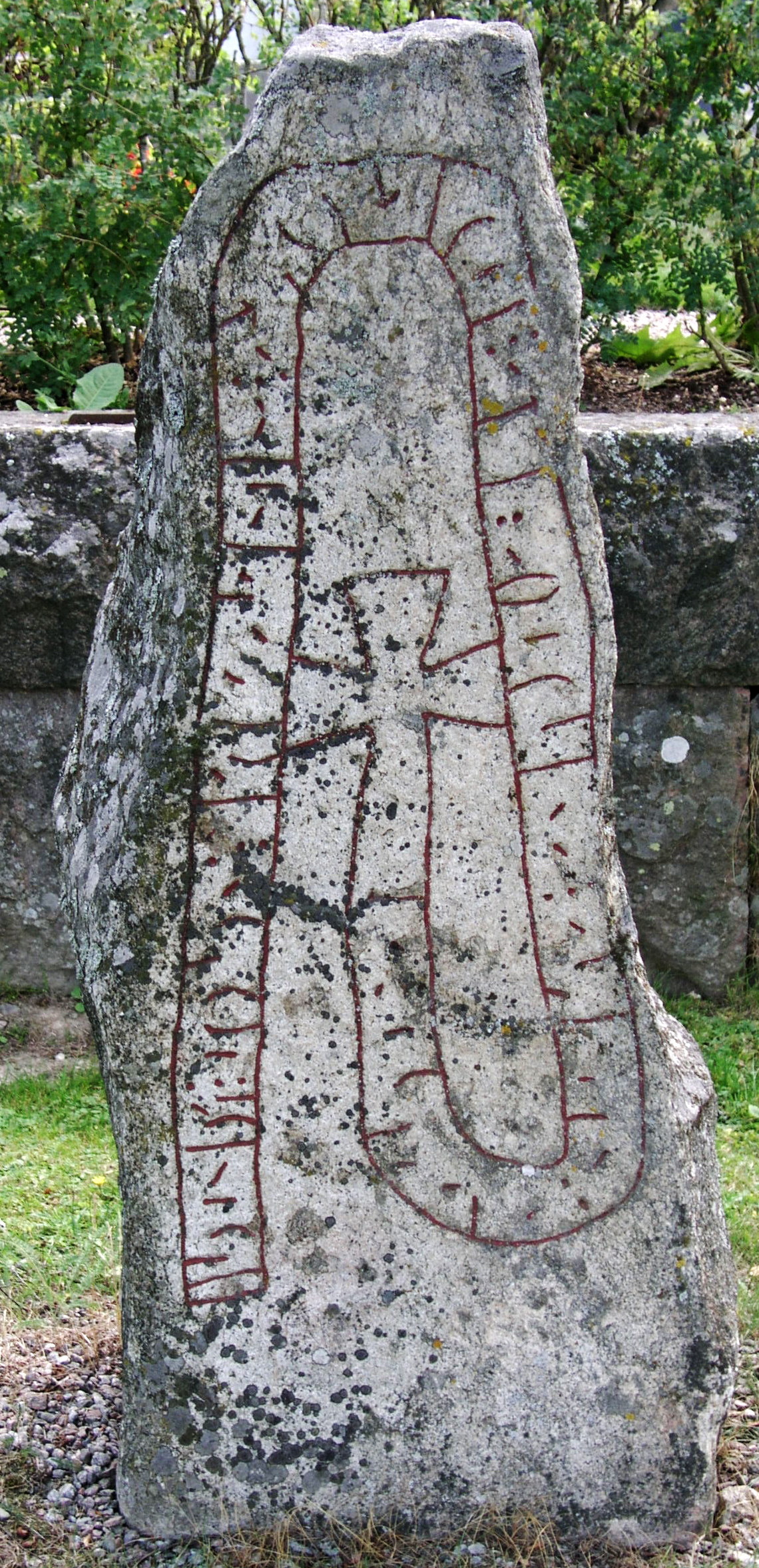
Runestone Hs 12 in Hög has staveless runes.

Staveless runes were the climax of the simplification process in the evolution of runic alphabets that had started when the Elder Futhark was superseded by the Younger Futhark. To create the staveless runes, vertical marks (or staves) were dropped from individual letters (or runes). The name "staveless" is not entirely accurate, since the i rune consists of a whole stave and the f, þ, k and the s runes consist of shortened main staves.

Since their discovery on runestones at Hälsingland in the 17th century, staveless runes have also been known as the Hälsinge runes. This label is, however, misleading since staveless runes also appear in Medelpad, Södermanland, and the Norwegian town of Bergen.

== Shape ==
The staveless runes may appear hard to recognize at first glance, but the only difference between them and the preceding Younger Futhark is – in fact – their omission of main staves. If main staves are added, it is apparent that the a, n, t, l and s runes are identical to their staved predecessors. No ą rune has been found in inscriptions, but it has been postulated that it was a mirrored form of the b rune due to pairings indicated in the staveless runes.

== Scholarship ==
It appears from the title page of Johannes Bureus' runic primer that Bureus had some understanding of the staveless runes in 1611, but that this has been denied by virtually all runologists. Since Bureus had not succeeded in deciphering the runes, a large poster with the image of two runestones with staveless runes was published in 1624 together with the announcement of a royal reward for the one who could decipher them. It would, however, take half a century before someone found the solution.

At the end of the 1660s, Athanasius Kircher, who was an interpreter of hieroglyphs, studied the runes, but he arrived at the conclusion that the staveless runes were nothing but meaningless scribbles, and that the stones had been erected to protect against snakes.

The verdict of the hieroglyph expert was too much for the mathematician, antiquarian and Hälsingland native Magnus Celsius. Celsius departed for Hälsingland in the early 1670s and made meticulous drawings of the runestones. When he was back in Stockholm, he worked hard on deciphering the runes but had to give up. Eventually he tried to add staves to the runes and suddenly deciphered some of the staveless runes. By 1674, he had deciphered all the runes except for the R rune, which he interpreted as a distinguishing mark.

The following year, Celsius made a speech at Uppsala University, where he made his discovery public. He started the process of publishing his discovery shortly after making the speech but died suddenly before the printing was finished. However, the news of the discovery spread quickly among scholars and it was used as the basis of the claim that stenography had originated in Sweden. It would be Olof Celsius who finally published his father's discovery.

== Examples ==
The following runestones are some of those that feature staveless runes:

- Österberga stone
- Skarpåker stone
- Sö 137 at Aspa bro
- Spånga stone

== See also ==
- Bind rune
