= Algiz =

Rune of the Elder Futhark alphabet

Name	Proto-Germanic	Old English	Old Norse		
Name	*algiz^{?}	eolhx^{?}	ýr, aur, stúpmaðr (Note: Stúpmaðr is the Medieval Old Swedish name, by Olaus Petri written as stupmadher (1520), meaning "stoop man", i.e. upside-down ᛘ.)		
Name	"elk"^{?}	"elk"^{?}, "elk-sedge"^{?}	"yew", "arrow", "stoop man"		
Shape	Elder Futhark	Futhorc	Younger Futhark		
Unicode	ᛉ U+16C9		ᛦ U+16E6	ᛧ U+16E7	ᛨ U+16E8
Transliteration	z, (Note: Proto-Germanic) ʀ (Note: Proto-Norse)	x	ʀ (Note: As a consonant.) y (Note: As a vowel.)		
Transcription	z, zh	x	ʀ, r² y, au, ø		
IPA	[z], [ʒ]^{?}	N/A (Note: This rune did not represent any sound in Old English. Consequently, it has no IPA equivalent. The use of this rune completely ceased except in the transliteration of Latin where it did not represent a phoneme but a grapheme.)	[ɻ], [ʒ]^{?} [y], [ɑu̯], [ø]		
Position in rune-row	15		16		

Algiz (also Elhaz) is the name conventionally given to the "z-rune" ᛉ of the Elder Futhark runic alphabet. Its transliteration is z, understood as a phoneme of the Proto-Germanic language, the terminal *z continuing Proto-Indo-European terminal *s via Verner's law.

It is one of two runes which express a phoneme that does not occur word-initially, and thus could not be named acrophonically, the other being the ŋ-rune Ingwaz ᛜ. As the terminal *-z phoneme marks the nominative singular suffix of masculine nouns, the rune occurs comparatively frequently in early epigraphy.

Because this specific phoneme was lost at an early time, the Elder Futhark rune underwent changes in the medieval runic alphabets. In the Anglo-Saxon futhorc it retained its shape, but became otiose as it ceased to represent any sound in an Old English. However, possibly due to runic manuscript tradition, it was occasionally used to transliterate the Latin letter X into the runic script.

In Proto-Norse and Old Norse, the Germanic *z phoneme developed into an R sound, perhaps realized as a retroflex approximant [ɻ], which is usually transcribed as ʀ. This sound was written in the Younger Futhark using the Yr rune ᛦ, the Algiz rune turned upside down, from about the 7th century. This phoneme eventually became indistinguishable from the regular r sound in the later stages of Old Norse, at about the 11th or 12th century.

The shape of the rune may be derived from that of a letter expressing /x/ in certain Old Italic alphabets (𐌙), which was in turn derived from the Greek letter Ψ which had the value of /kʰ/ (rather than /ps/) in the Western Greek alphabet. Alternatively, the rune may have been an original innovation, or it may have been adapted from the classical Latin alphabet's Y, or from the Rhaetic alphabet's Z.

== Name ==
The Elder Futhark rune ᛉ is conventionally called Algiz or Elhaz, from the Common Germanic word for "elk".

There is wide agreement that this is most likely not the historical name of the rune, but in the absence of any positive evidence of what the historical name may have been, the conventional name is simply based on a reading of the rune name in the Anglo-Saxon rune poem, first suggested by Wilhelm Grimm (Über deutsche Runen, 1821), as eolh or eolug "elk".

Like the ng-rune, the z-rune is a special case inasmuch as it could not have been named acrophonically, since the sound it represents did not occur in word-initial position. Choosing a name that terminates in -z would have been more or less arbitrary, as this was the nominative singular suffix of almost every masculine noun of the language. Since the name eolh, or more accurately eolh-secg "elk-sedge" in the Anglo-Saxon rune poem represents not the rune's original sound value, but rather the sound of Latin x (/ks/), it becomes highly arbitrary to suggest that the original rune should have been named after the elk.

There are a number of speculative suggestions surrounding the history of the rune's name. The difficulty lies in the circumstance that the Younger Futhark rune did not inherit this name at all, but acquired the name of the obsolete Eihwaz rune, as yr. The only independent evidence of the Elder Futhark rune's name would be the name of the corresponding Gothic letter, ezec. The Gothic letter was an adoption of Greek Zeta, and while it did express the /z/ phoneme, this Gothic sound only rarely occurred terminally. Instead, it is found mostly in positions where West and North Germanic have r, e.g. Gothic máiza "greater" (Old Norse meira, English more).

The name of the Anglo-Saxon rune ᛉ is variously recorded as eolx, eolhx, ilcs, ilx, iolx, ilix, elux.

Manuscript tradition gives its sound value as Latin x, i.e. /ks/, or alternatively as il, or yet again as "l and x". The reading of this opaque name as eolh "elk" is entirely due to the reading of the Anglo-Saxon rune poem's ᛉ secg as eolh-secg (eolx-secg, eolug-secg, eolxecg) "elk-sedge", apparently the name of a species of sedge (Carex). This reading of the poem is due to Wilhelm Grimm (1821), and remains standard. The suggestion is that this compound is realized as eolk-secg, thus containing the Latin x (/ks/) sound sequence. The manuscript testimony that the rune is to be read as il would then be simply a mistaken assumption that its name must be acrophonic.

The name of the corresponding Gothic letter ezec, however, suggests that the old name of this rune was not just eolx, but the full eolh-secg. This is puzzling, because the sound value of the rune was clearly not /ks/ in the Elder Futhark period (2nd to 4th centuries). Furthermore, the name of the sedge in question is recorded in the older Epinal-Erfurt glossary as ilugsegg (glossing papiluus, probably for papyrus), which cannot be derived from the word for elk.

A suggestion by Warren and Elliott takes the Old English eolh at face value, and reconstructs a Common Germanic form of either *algiz or *alhiz. They cite a "more fanciful school" which assumes an original meaning of "elk" based on a theonym Alcis recorded by Tacitus (suggesting that the name would have been theophoric in origin, referring to an "elk-god"). The authors dismiss the Old English "elk-sedge" as a late attempt to give the then-obsolete rune a value of Latin x. Instead, they suggest that the original name of the rune could have been Common Germanic *algiz ('Algie'), meaning not "elk" but "protection, defence".

Redbond (1936) suggested that the eolhx (etc.) may have been a corruption of helix. Seebold (1991) took this up to suggest that the name of the rune may be connected to the use of elux for helix by Notker to describe the constellation of Ursa Major (as turning around the celestial pole).

An earlier suggestion is that of Zacher (1855), to the effect that the earliest value of this rune was the labiovelar /hw/, and that its name may have been hweol "wheel".

== ᛉ – Elder Futhark ==
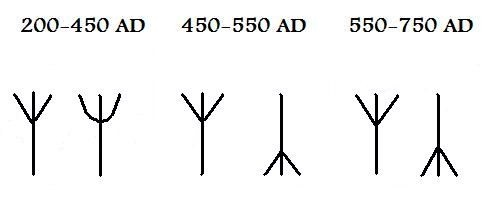
The varying forms of the rune in the Elder futhark during the centuries.

In the Elder Futhark, Algiz represents the Germanic phoneme *z, which does not occur word-initially.

It is attested in final position in the earliest inscriptions, e.g. in ansuz (Vimose buckle), þewaz (Thorsberg chape). It was presumably present in the Øvre Stabu spearhead inscription (ca. AD 180), reading raunija[z], but is hardly legible now. The Nydam axe-handle (4th century) has the name wagagastiz. The Golden Horns of Gallehus (early 5th century) had the personal name hlewagastiz holtijaz.

In the earliest inscriptions, the rune invariably has its standard Ψ-shape. From the 5th century or so, the rune appears optionally in its upside-down variant which would become the standard Younger Futhark yr shape. There are also other graphical variants; for example, the Charnay Fibula has a superposition of these two variants, resulting in an "asterisk" shape (ᛯ).

== ᛉ – Anglo-Saxon futhorc ==
The name of the Anglo-Saxon rune ᛉ is variously recorded as eolx, ilcs, ilix, elux, eolhx. Manuscript tradition gives its sound value as Latin x, i.e. /ks/, or alternatively as il, or yet again as "l and x". The relevant stanza of the Anglo-Saxon rune poem reads:

ᛉ sec[g e]ard hæfþ oftust on fenne
ƿexeð on ƿature, ƿundaþ grimme
blode breneð beorna gehƿẏlcne
ðe him ænigne onfeng gedeþ.

Reading the rune as eolhx (as discussed above), and with the emendation of seccard to secg eard due to Grimm (1821), the stanza becomes about a species of sedge (Cladium mariscus) called "elk-sedge". In the translation of R. I. Page, the sedge:

usually lives in the fen,
growing in the water. It wounds severely,
staining with blood any man
who makes a grab at it.

The 9th-century abecedarium anguliscum in Codex Sangallensis 878 shows eolh as a peculiar shape, as it were a bindrune of the older ᛉ with the Younger Futhark ᛦ, resulting in an "asterisk" shape similar to ior ᛡ.

The only known instance where the rune does take the sound value of Latin x in epigraphy is the spelling of rex "king" on the interlace coin dies of king Beonna (mid 8th century). Furthermore, it appears in the inscription on St Cuthbert's coffin (late 7th century) in the abbreviation of the name Christ, where Greek ΧΡΣ is taken as Latin xps and rendered as runic ᛉᛈᛋ.

== ᛦ – Younger Futhark ==
In the 6th and 7th centuries, the Elder Futhark started changing and eventually began being replaced by the Younger Futhark in Scandinavia. For a period, both were in use (see for example the Rök runestone), but by the 9th century, the Elder Futhark was extinct as its own writing system, and Scandinavian runic inscriptions were exclusively written in Younger Futhark, however, knowledge of the older system remained onward for some period, as shown with the Östergötland Runic Inscription 43 from the mid 9th century, which utilizes a ᛞ dagr rune as part of the inscription.

The Yr rune ᛦ is a rune of the Younger Futhark. Its common transliteration is a small capital ʀ (and its uppercase form would be Ʀ). The shape of the Yr rune in the Younger Futhark is the inverted shape of the Elder Futhark rune (ᛉ). Its name yr ("yew") is taken from the name of the Elder Futhark Eihwaz rune.

Its phonological value is the continuation of the phoneme represented by Algiz, the word-final *-z in Proto Germanic. In Proto-Norse it is pronounced closer to /r/, perhaps /ɻ/. Within later Old Norse, the Proto-Norse phoneme collapses with /r/ by the 12th century.

Unicode has U+0280 ʀ LATIN LETTER SMALL CAPITAL R (IPA’s symbol for the uvular trill). A corresponding capital letter is at U+01A6 Ʀ LATIN LETTER YR. The rune itself is encoded at U+16E6 ᛦ RUNIC LETTER LONG-BRANCH-YR. Its variants are U+16E7 ᛧ RUNIC LETTER SHORT-TWIG-YR (ᛧ) and U+16E8 ᛨ RUNIC LETTER ICELANDIC-YR (ᛨ).

== Derivatives ==
=== ᛘ – Younger Futhark ===
Independently, the shape of the Elder Futhark Algiz rune reappears in the Younger Futhark Maðr rune ᛘ, continuing the Elder Futhark ᛗ rune *Mannaz.

=== ᛣ – Anglo-Saxon ===
The Anglo-Saxon k-rune ᛣ (Calc) has the same shape as Younger Futhark yr, but is unrelated in origin, being a modification or "doubling" of the c-rune ᚳ (Cēn).

== Modern usage ==
=== "Life rune" and "death rune" ===
19th Century German occultist Guido von List introduced the use of the Armanen Futharkh, which were based on the Elder & Younger Futhark. In List's context, the Man rune (identical in shape to the Elder Futhark Algiz) came to be understood in the Germanic mysticism of the early 20th century as symbolizing "life" and called the "life rune" (German: Lebensrune). This term occurs as early as the 1920s in the literature of Ariosophy.

The Yr rune from the Younger Futhark came to be seen as the "life rune" inverted, and so interpreted as "death rune" (Todesrune).

=== Nazism ===
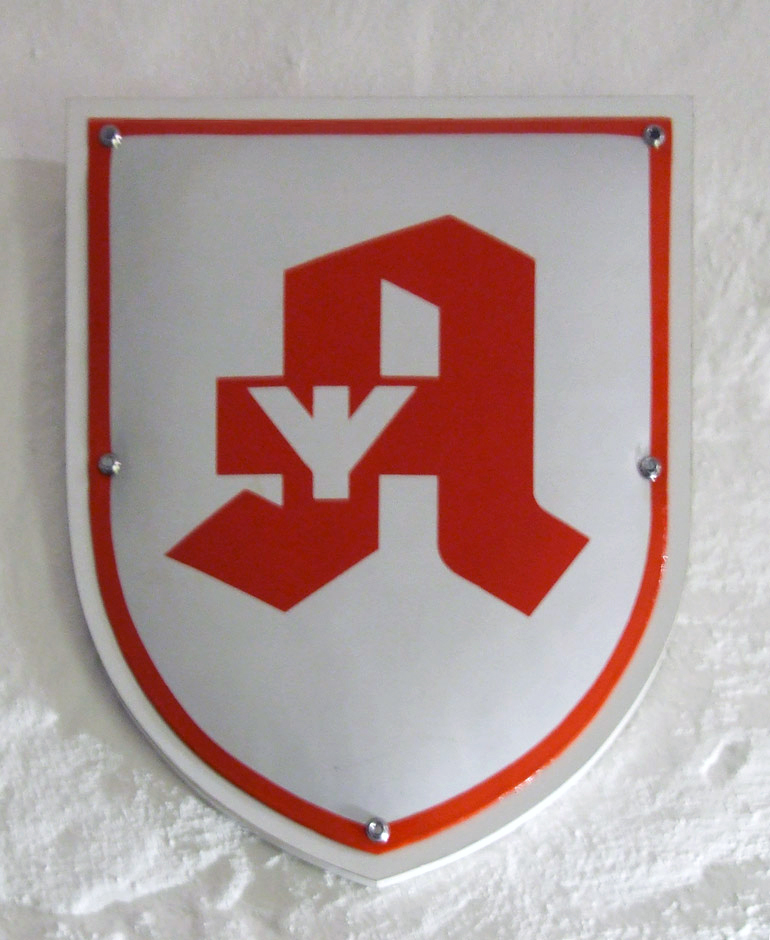
Nazi-era pharmacy logo with the white "life rune".

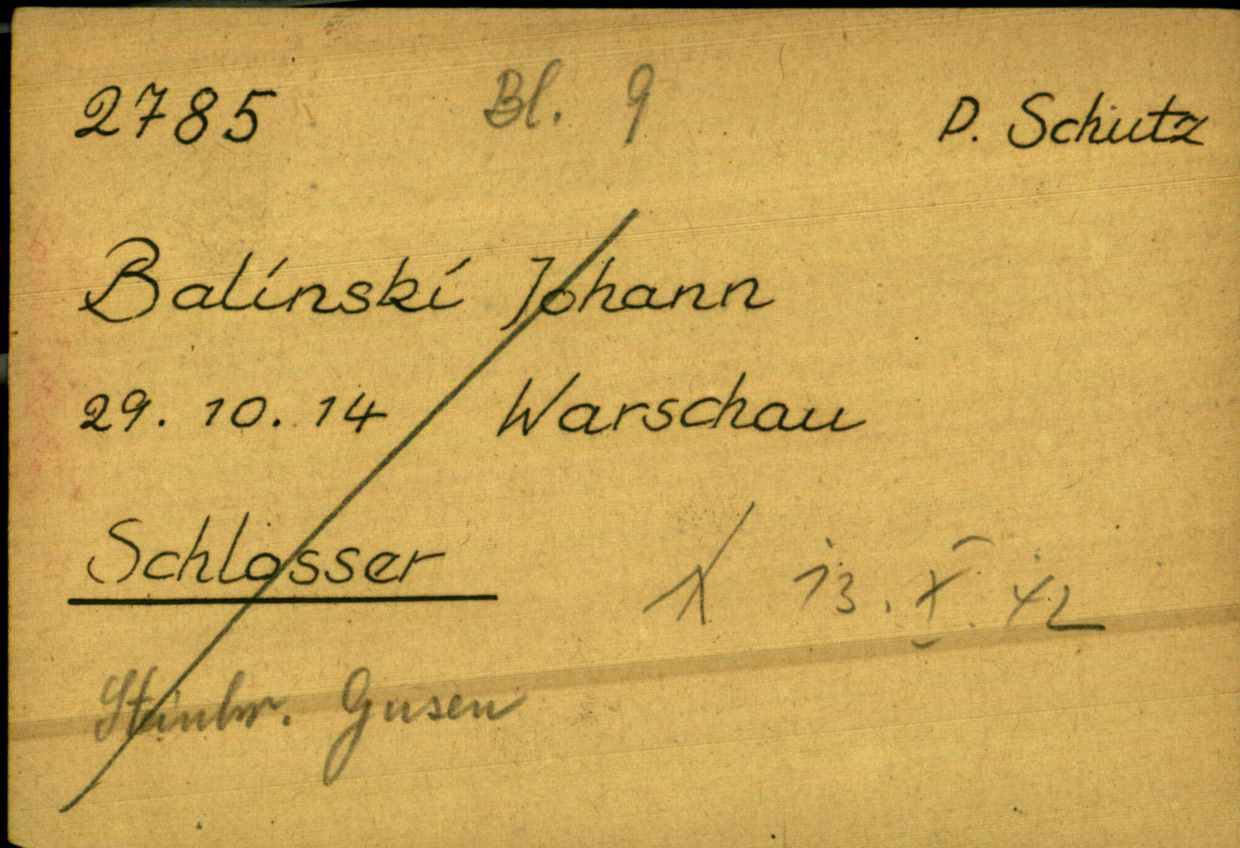
Prisoner registry card from Mauthausen-Gusen Nazi Concentration Camp with “death rune” used to indicate the prisoner’s date of death (ᛦ 13.X.42)

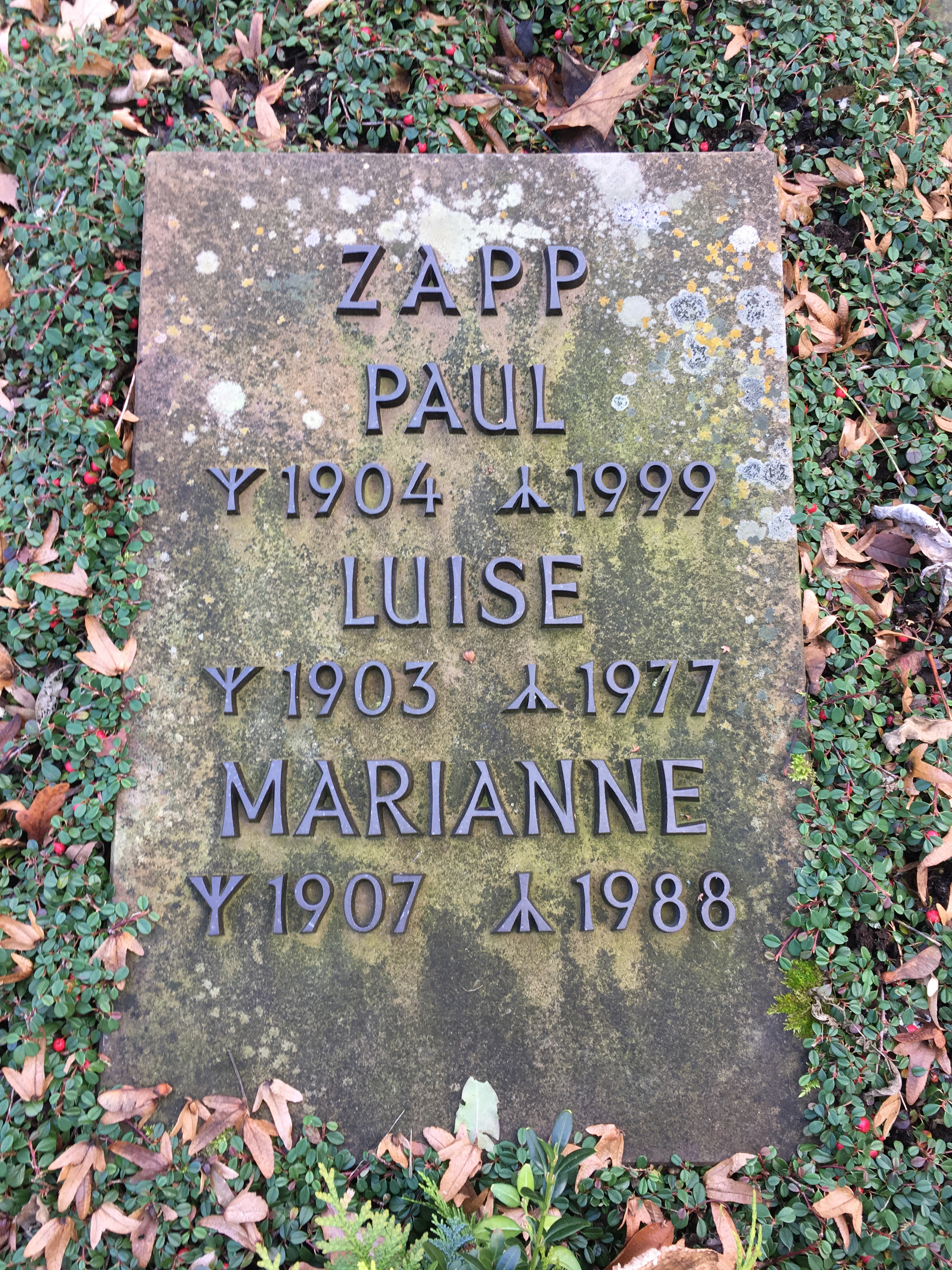
Contemporary (1999) use of the "life rune"/"death rune" notation in a grave marker in Niederaula, Germany. Such usage of the "Totenrune" saw a resurgence during the Nazi era.

Guido von List's beliefs incorporated antisemitism and volkism, and his runic system was later adopted and modified by Karl Maria Wiligut who was responsible for their adoptions in Nazi occultism. Algiz came to be widely used within the Nazi Party and Nazi Germany, e.g. in official prescriptions for the various uniforms of the Sturmabteilung.

During the World War II era, the "life-rune" and "death rune" came to be used in obituaries and on tomb stones as marking birth and death dates (ᛉ for "born", ᛦ for "died"), replacing asterisk and cross symbols (* for "born", † for "died") conventionally used in this context in Germany. It has always been clear that this association is an innovation of modern esotericism, without direct precedent in the medieval usage of the Younger Futhark alphabet. This fact was pointed out in an article in the German journal Stimmen der Zeit as early as in 1940.

=== Pop culture ===
The neo-folk group Death in June used the Algiz in their cover of their double LP The Wörld Thät Sümmer, alongside their "Totenkopf 6" logo.

The term "death rune" has been used in the context of esotericist or occultist aesthetics associated with black metal, in the name of Deathrune Records (as of 2011), formerly Die Todesrune Records, a minor black metal record label.

=== Contemporary neopaganism ===
As with other Futhark runes, Algiz is commonly used as a symbol of neopagan faith.

Following Ralph Blum (1982), the Algiz rune is given a sense of "protection" in some modern systems of runic divination. Blum (1982) himself glosses for Algiz with "Protection; Sedge or Rushes; An Elk".

=== Contemporary fascism ===
Due to its use in Nazi Germany, Algiz is also used as a present-day fascist symbol, including use in white supremacism and ecofascism. Contemporary examples include use by the American National Alliance (as of 2007), and in reference to the Algiz rune in the logo of the Flemish nationalist Voorpost as levensrune (as of 2016).

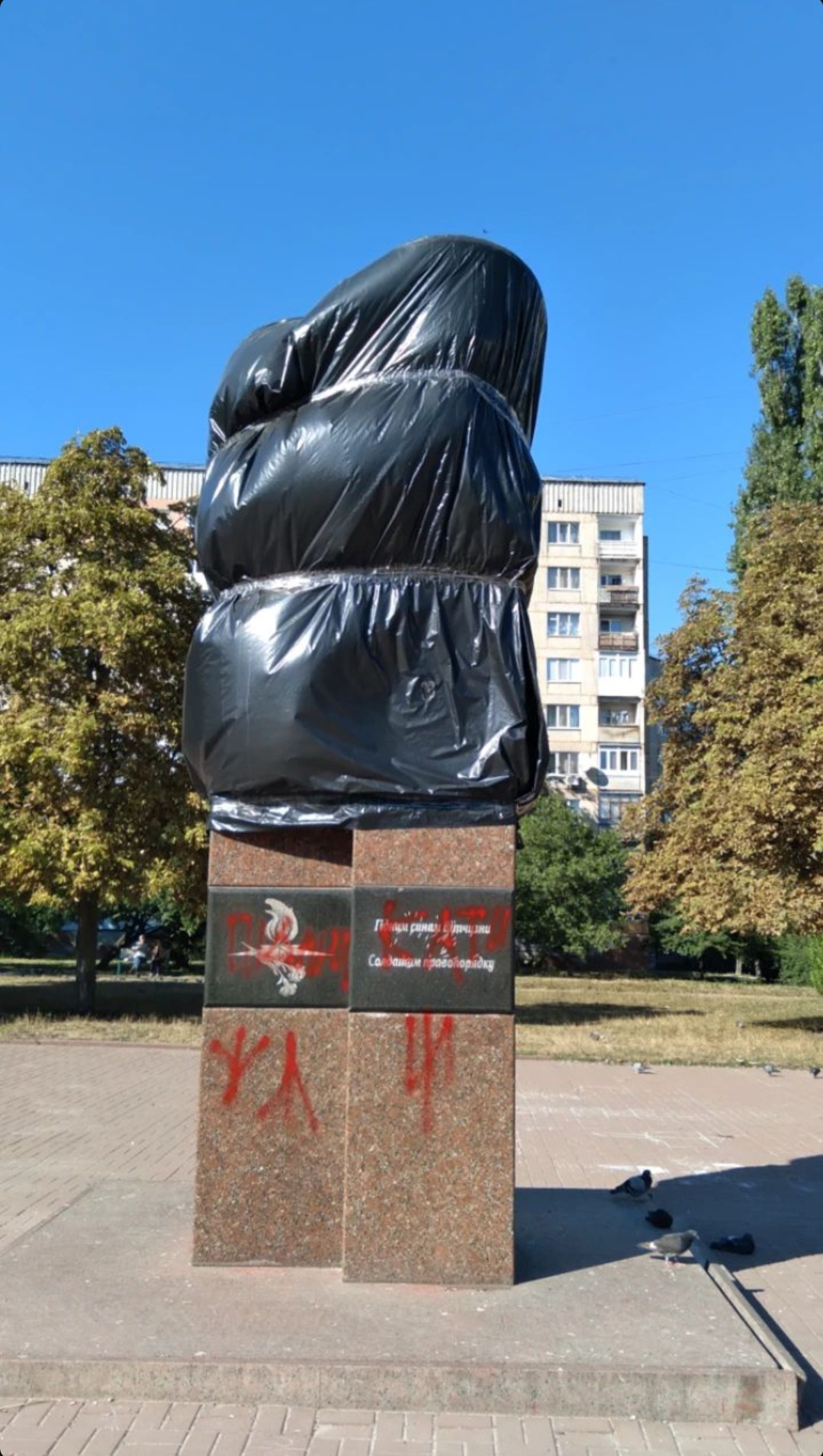
Memorial to the Cheka in Ukraine, vandalized with Algiz and Yr runes (lower left).

Since Algiz is also commonly used by non-racist groups and individuals, the rune does not automatically indicate the presence of fascism or racism: its meaning depends on the context where it is used.

== See also ==
- Elder Futhark
- Younger Futhark
