= Wawa Runestone =

Modern runestone with the Lord's Prayer

The Wawa Runestone is a piece of bedrock stone covered in runes, discovered near Wawa, Ontario, Canada in 2015. The runes spell out a Swedish-language version of the Lord’s Prayer and are believed to have been carved in the early to mid-19th century by a Swedish Canadian. Unlike many other runestones found in continental America, such as the Kensington Runestone, the Wawa Runestone is not believed to be a hoax related to the Norse colonization of North America.

== Discovery and identification ==
The runestone was discovered in 2015, after being revealed when two trees growing on top of it fell. In 2018, a local historian who had been shown the stone contacted the Ontario Centre of Archaeological Research & Education (OCARE), believing the carvings might be petroglyphs. After an initial site visit by OCARE in October 2018, it was determined the carvings were likely an inscription made up of Futhark characters.

Henrik Williams, a runologist from Uppsala University, and Loraine Jensen, then president of the American Association for Runic Studies, were brought to the site in October 2019. During their visit, the inscription was confirmed to be runic, containing a 16th-century version of the Lord's Prayer, written in Swedish. The existence of the runestone was not publicly announced until June 2025, allowing time to study the inscription, as archeologists had worried the runestone could be misinterpreted—without the context extended research provided—as being created by Vikings. Terms also had to be worked out with the property owner, as the stone was found on private land. In 2025, Henrik Williams gave an extensive interview to David Pompeani giving insight into the stone.

== Description ==
Carved into bedrock, there are 255 runes arranged in a square about 1.2 metres (3.9 ft) by 1.5 metres (4.9 ft). Next to the inscription is a second carving of a boat, with 16 persons aboard. Surrounding the boat are 14 marks, perhaps crosses, stars, or Xs.

The runic inscription used a variation of the runic translation developed by Johannes Bureus in the early 17th century, and published in the 1611 Runa ABC. The inscription contains the Lord's Prayer and was carved in the early to mid-19th century, perhaps by a Swedish employee of the Hudson's Bay Company, which had a trading post nearby. The stone was likely intentionally covered up at some point. It is not believed to be a hoax attempting to place Vikings in that area of Canada.

== See also ==
- Beardmore Relics
- List of runestones
