= Runa ABC =

First Swedish alphabet book

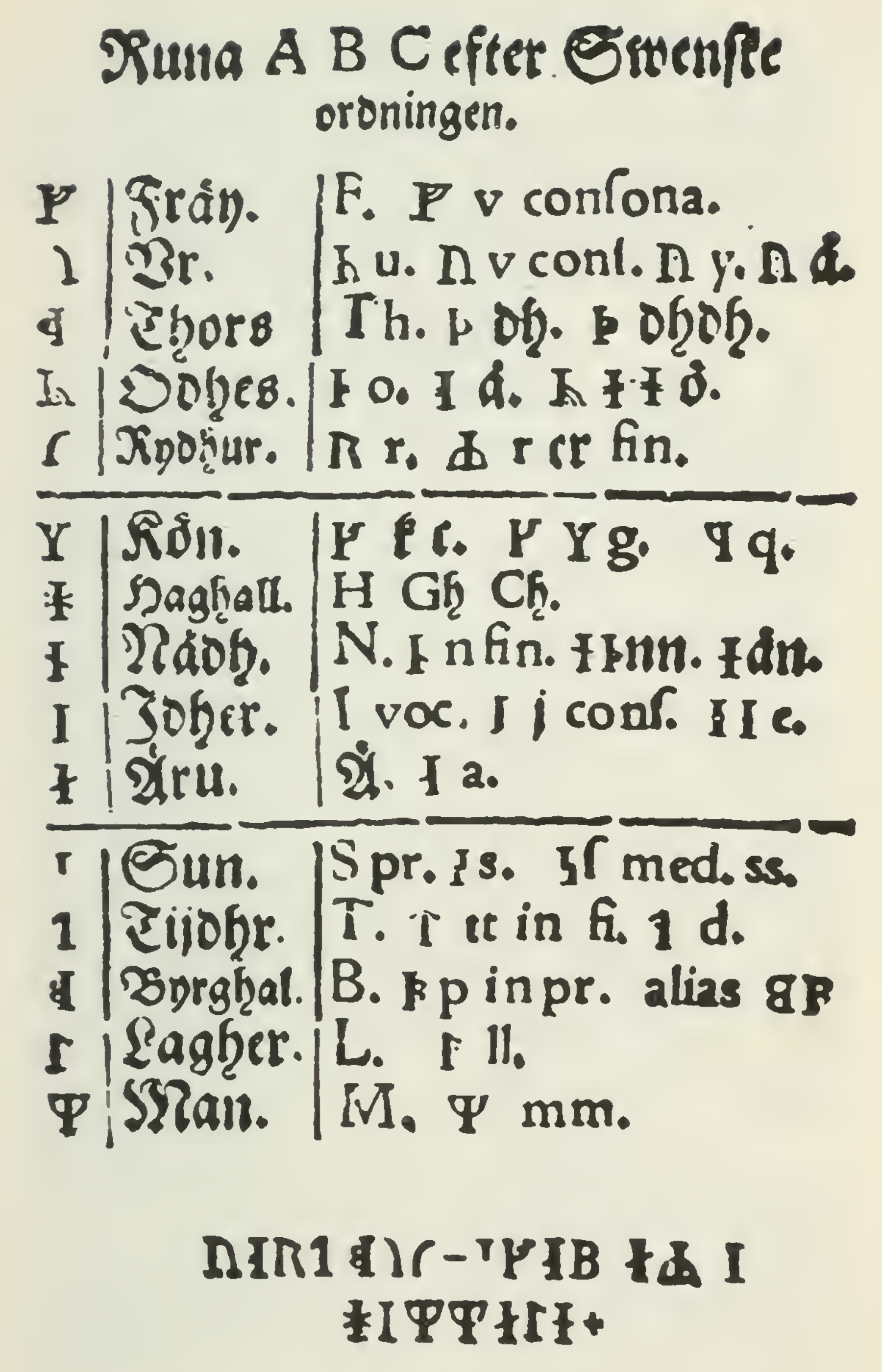
A page from the 1611 edition, depicting Bureus' 15-type futhark

The Runa ABC of Johannes Bureus was the first Swedish alphabet book and its purpose was to teach the runic alphabet in 17th-century Sweden.

The runology pioneer Johannes Bureus was a religious Christian, but regretted that Christian influence had replaced the runic script with the Latin script. His good reputation and his influential friends enabled him to acquire the royal privilege that no alphabet books could be printed without teaching the runic alphabet and no one was allowed to print them but himself. The result was that the first Swedish alphabet book ever printed had the purpose of teaching runes.

The first edition of Runa ABC was printed in 1611. It contained the Latin alphabet in ABC order and the runic alphabet in both the futhark order and in the order of the Latin alphabet. Bureus had also added the names of the runes, the phonemes they represented as well as some spelling rules. The booklet contained small Christian texts, which were written in runes on one side and in Latin letters on the opposite one. The last edition was printed in 1624, and it was more pedagogical than the first one, since the Latin letters were placed directly under the runes. Whereas the first edition ended with some prayers written in Latin letters, the 1624 edition had the final prayers written with runes, without any Latin transliteration.

Bureus did not succeed in making the runes replace the Latin alphabet since people were too familiar with the Latin letters. However, during the Thirty Years' War, some Swedish officers encrypted their messages by writing with runes.

Lars Magnar Enoksen notes that it appears from the title page of Johannes Bureus' first edition that Bureus had some understanding of the staveless runes in 1611, but that this has been denied by virtually all runologists.

A version of the futhark Lord's Prayer from the book was found in 2018 engraved on the Wawa Runestone in Ontario, Canada. It has been explained as the work of a 19th-century Swede employed at a trading post, who had access to a 19th-century re-edition of the book.

== See also ==
- Gothicismus
- List of runestones
