= Abecedarium Nordmannicum =

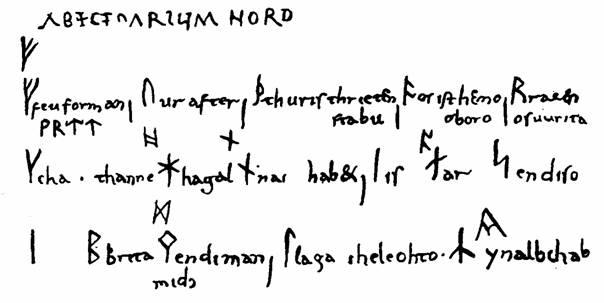
1828 copy by Wilhelm Grimm

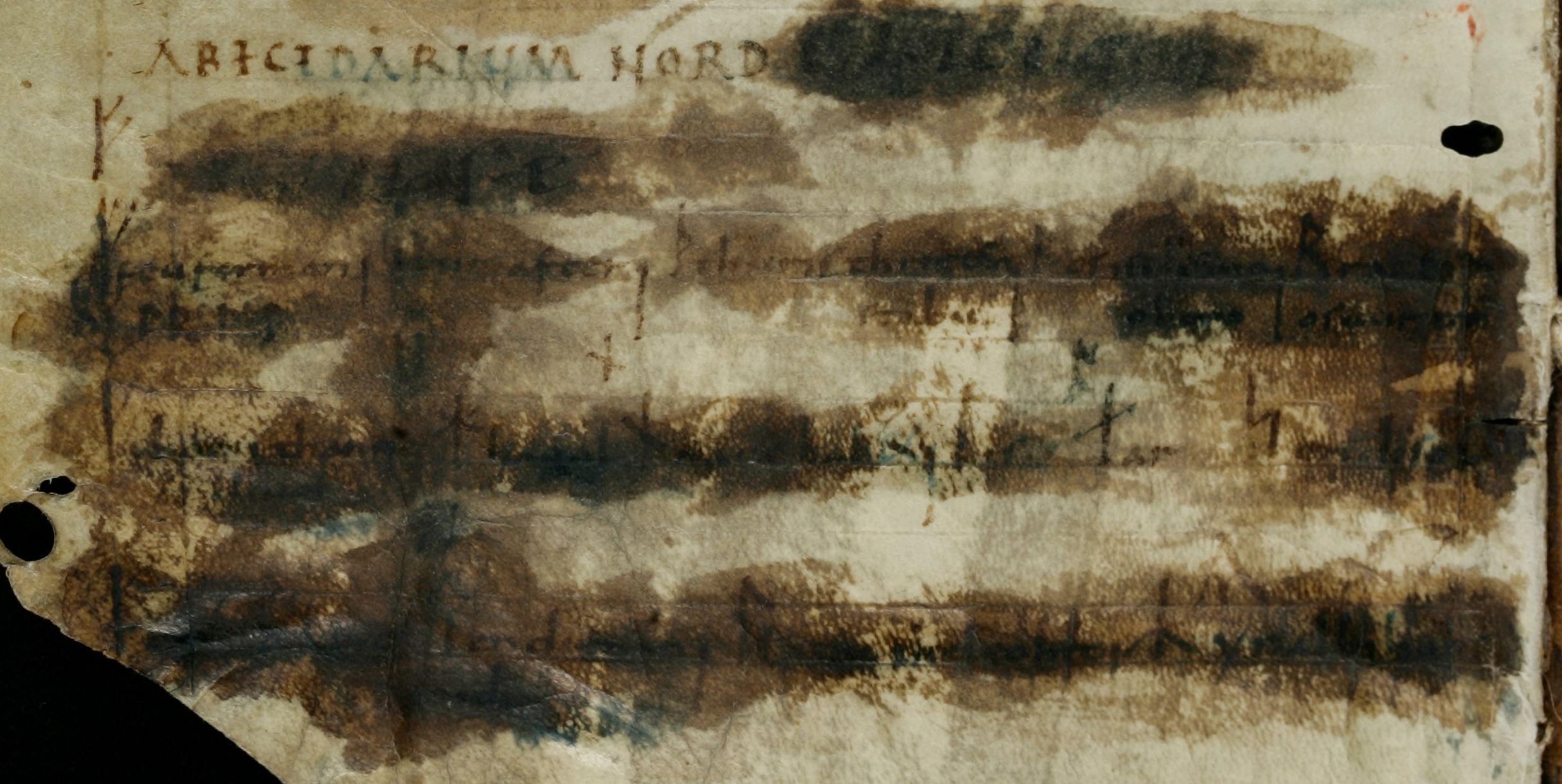
State of the abecedarium after the failed preservation attempt

The Abecedarium Nordmannicum is a presentation of the 16 runes of the Younger Futhark as a short poem (sometimes counted as one of the "rune poems"), in the 9th-century Codex Sangallensis 878 (on page 321). The Younger Futhark are given after the Hebrew alphabet on the preceding page, and the Anglo-Saxon futhorc on the same page. The text of the rune poem was unfortunately destroyed in the 19th century by chemicals intended for its preservation. It survives in an 1828 drawing by Wilhelm Grimm.

== Contents and translation ==
Under a heading ABECEDARIUM NORD, the manuscript presents the Younger Futhark in three lines. Linguistically, the text is a mixture of Old Norse, Old Saxon and Old High German. It is probably based on a Danish original, maybe imported from Haithabu to Lower Germany, and adapted to the idiom of its recipients. The background of the Carolingian notation of Norse runes is that of intensified contacts between the Frankish Empire and Denmark which necessitated interpreters for economic and political exchanges.

The following is a transcription of Grimm's drawing (the oblique stroke indicates words written below the line):

ᚠ feu forman / ᚹᚱᛠᛏ | ᚢ ur after | ᚦ thuris thrit[c]en / stabu | ᚭ os ist [he]mo / oboro | ᚱ rat end/os uuritan
ᚴ cha[on] thanne / cliuot ᚼ hagal ᚾ nau[t] hab& |ᛁ is ᛅ ar ᛋ endi so[l]
[ᛐ] ᛒ brica ᛙ endi man / midi | ᛚ lagu the leohto | ᛦ yr al bihab[et]

The Abecedarium Nordmanicum is on the same page as the Abecedarium anguliscum (the Anglo-Saxon runes). There are interlineal glosses for some of the runes specific to the Younger Futhark, giving their Anglo-Saxon phonetic equivalents: ᚼ hagal is glossed with ᚻ haegl, ᛅ ar with ᚪ ac, ᛙ man with ᛗ man, and ᛦ yr with ᚣ yr. The content of the poem are the names of the runes, connected by a few additional alliterating words as mnemonical aids. For the r, m and l runes, the Anglo-Saxon names are given rather than the Scandinavian ones, as rat, man and lagu for reidh, madr and logr, respectively. The Anglo-Saxon runes ᚹᚱᛠᛏ (wreat) written underneath the feu forman of the first line. It is not clear whether they should be considered part of the poem's text.

There are slight differences as to how the poem has been read. Gallée (1894) reads the text as follows:

Feu forman, Ur after, Thuris thritten stabu, Os ist imo oboro, Rat endost uuritan.
Chaon thanne cliuet Hagal Naut habet Is, Ar endi Sol.
Tiu, Brica, endi Man midi, Lagu the leohto, Yr al bihabet.

The imo in the first line is the reading of von Arx (); it is also read as (uninterpretable) hiemo or heno or keno. The name tiu is an emendation for a gap in the text. Dickins (1916) gave the following (cursive letters marking emendations):

Feu forman / Ur after / Thuris thritten stabu, / Os is himo oboro / Rat endost ritan
Chaon thanne cliuôt. / Hagal, Naut habet / Is, Ar endi Sol
Tiu, Brica endi Man midi / Lagu the leohto / Yr al bihabet.

The text is interpreted as a simple mnemonic list of rune names, translating to something like:

Feu [write] first, Ur after, Thuris the third letter, Os is following it, Rat write at the end.
Chaon then follows ("cleaves"), Hagal, Naut has ("holds") Is, Ar and Sol.
[Tiu], Brica and Man in the middle, Lago the bright, Yr concludes ("contains") the whole.

The text does not appear to associate any meaning with the letter names, merely describing their sequence in the futhark row. A possible exception to this is lagu which is glossed as "the bright" (lioht being an Old High German adjective meaning "bright, light, clear", or as a noun liohta "lamp, beacon").
