= Beonna =

Beonna is an Anglo-Saxon name, and may refer to:

- Beonna of East Anglia, King of East Anglia
- Saint Beonna of Glastonbury
- Saint Beonna of Breedon
- Beonna, Bishop of Hereford

== See also ==
- Breonna
