= Codex Sangallensis 878 =

Codex Sangallensis 878 is a manuscript kept in the library of the Abbey of St. Gall, in Switzerland. It dates to the 9th century and probably originates in Fulda monastery. It contains mainly excerpts of grammatical texts, including the Ars minor and Ars major of Aelius Donatus, the grammar of Priscian, the Etymologiae of Isidore of Sevilla and the grammar of Alcuin. Furthermore, it contains a presentation of the Greek alphabet, the Hebrew alphabet, the Anglo-Saxon runes and the Scandinavian Younger Futhark, the latter in the form of a short rune poem known as the Abecedarium Nordmannicum.

Bischoff (1980) considers the manuscript a personal collection or brevarium of Walahfrid Strabo, who from 827 was in Fulda as a student of Hrabanus Maurus and from 838 was abbot of the Reichenau Abbey. Hrabanus himself is known to have been interested in runes and he is credited with the treatise Hrabani Mauri abbatis fuldensis, de inventione linguarum ab Hebraea usque ad Theodiscam ("on the invention of languages, from Hebrew to German"), identifying the Hebrew and Germanic ("Theodish") languages with their respective alphabets.
