= Younger Futhark =

System of runes for Old Norse

- Script type: Alphabet
- Period: 8th to 12th centuries
- Direction: Left-to-right, boustrophedon, right-to-left script
- Languages: Old Norse

Related scripts
- Parent systems: Phoenician alphabet: Greek alphabet; Old Italic alphabet; Elder Futhark; Younger Futhark
- Child systems: Medieval runes
- Sister systems: Anglo-Saxon runes

ISO 15924
- ISO 15924: Runr (211), Runic

Unicode
- Unicode alias: Runic

The Younger Futhark (/ˈfuːθɑːrk/ FOO-thark), also called Scandinavian runes, is a runic alphabet and a reduced form of the Elder Futhark, with only 16 characters, in use from about the 9th century, after a "transitional period" during the 7th and 8th centuries. The reduction happened at the same time as phonetic changes that led to a greater number of different phonemes in the spoken language, when Proto-Norse evolved into Old Norse. Also, the writing custom avoided carving the same rune consecutively for the same sound, so the spoken distinction between long and short vowels was lost in writing. Thus, the language included distinct sounds and minimal pairs that were written the same.

The Younger Futhark is divided into long-branch (Danish) and short-twig (Swedish and Norwegian) runes; in the 10th century, it was further expanded by the "Hälsinge Runes" or staveless runes.

The lifetime of the Younger Futhark corresponds roughly to the Viking Age. Their use declined after the Christianization of Scandinavia; most writing in Scandinavia from the 12th century was in the Latin alphabet, but the runic scripts survived in marginal use in the form of the medieval runes (in use AD 1100–1500) and the Latinised Dalecarlian runes (AD 1500–1910).

== History ==
Usage of the Younger Futhark is found in Scandinavia and Viking Age settlements abroad, probably in use from the 9th century onward. During the Migration Period Elder Futhark had been an actual "secret" known to only a literate elite, with only some 350 surviving inscriptions. Literacy in the Younger Futhark became widespread in Scandinavia, as witnessed by the great number of Runestones (some 3,000), sometimes inscribed with almost casual notes.

During a phase from about 650 to 800, some inscriptions mixed the use of Elder and Younger Futhark runes. Examples of inscriptions considered to be from this period include DR 248 from Snoldelev, DR 357 from Stentoften, DR 358 from Gummarp, DR 359 from Istaby, and DR 360 from Björketorp, and objects such as the Setre Comb (N KJ40). Ög 136 in Rök, which uses Elder Futhark runes to encrypt part of the text, and Ög 43 in Ingelstad, which uses a single Elder Futhark rune as an ideogram, are also sometimes included as transitional inscriptions.

By the late 8th century, the reduction from 24 to 16 runes was complete. The main change was that the difference between voiced and unvoiced consonants was no longer expressed in writing. Other changes are the consequence of sound changes that separate Old Norse from Proto-Norse and Common Germanic (mostly changes to the vowel system).

- The first ætt was reduced to its first six letters, fuþąrk, losing the g and w runes (the old a rune is transliterated as ą for Old Norse as the phoneme it expressed had become more closed).
- The second ætt lost the æ and p runes. The j rune was rendered superfluous due to Old Norse sound changes, but was kept with the new sound value of a. The old z rune was kept (transliterated in the context of Old Norse as ʀ) but moved to the end of the entire sequence in the only change of letter ordering in Younger Futhark.
- The third ætt was reduced by four runes, losing the e, ŋ, o and d runes.

In tabular form:

Elder Futhark	ᚠ f	ᚢ u	ᚦ þ	ᚨ a	ᚱ r	ᚲ k	ᚷ g	ᚹ w	ᚺ h	ᚾ n	ᛁ i	ᛃ j	ᛇ æ	ᛈ p	ᛉ z	ᛊ s	ᛏ t	ᛒ b	ᛖ e	ᛗ m	ᛚ l	ᛜ ŋ	ᛟ o	ᛞ d
Younger Futhark	ᚠ f	ᚢ u/v/w, y, o, ø	ᚦ þ, ð	ᚬ ą, o, æ	ᚱ r	ᚴ k, g, ŋ	—	—	ᚼ/ᚽ h	ᚾ/ᚿ n	ᛁ i, e	ᛅ/ᛆ a, æ, e	—	—	ᛦ ʀ	ᛋ/ᛌ s	ᛏ/ᛐ t, d	ᛒ b, p	—	ᛘ m	ᛚ l	—	—	—

The Younger Futhark became known in Europe as the "alphabet of the Norsemen", and was studied in the interest of trade and diplomatic contacts, referred to as Abecedarium Nordmannicum in Frankish Fulda (possibly by Walahfrid Strabo) and ogam lochlannach "Ogham of the Scandinavians" in the Book of Ballymote.

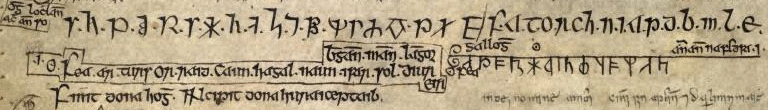
The ogam lochlannach, Book of Ballymote, fol. 170v

== Rune names ==
The names of the 16 runes of the Younger futhark are recorded in the Icelandic and Norwegian rune poems. The names are:

- ᚠ fé ("wealth")
- ᚢ úr ("rain")
- ᚦ þurs ("giant (jötunn)")
- ᚬ/ᚭ áss ("(a) god")
- ᚱ reið ("ride")
- ᚴ kaun ("ulcer")
- ᚼ/ᚽ hagall ("hail")
- ᚾ/ᚿ nauðr ("need")
- ᛁ íss ("ice")
- ᛅ/ᛆ ár ("plenty")
- ᛋ/ᛌ sól ("sun (personified as a deity)")
- ᛏ/ᛐ Týr ("Týr (a deity)")
- ᛒ/ᛓ bjǫrk ("birch")
- ᛘ/ᛙ maðr ("man")
- ᛚ lǫgr ("sea")
- ᛦ/ᛧ ýr ("yew")

From comparison with Anglo-Saxon and Gothic letter names, most of these names directly continue the names of the Elder Futhark runes. The exceptions to this are:

- ýr which continues the name of the unrelated Eihwaz rune;
- þurs and kaun, in which cases the Old Norse, Anglo-Saxon and Gothic traditions diverge.

== Variants ==
The Younger Futhark is divided into long-branch (Danish) and short-twig (Swedish and Norwegian) runes. The difference between the two versions has been a matter of controversy. A general opinion is that the difference was functional, i.e. the long-branch runes were used for documentation on stone, whereas the short-twig runes were in everyday use for private or official messages on wood.

=== Long-branch runes ===
The Younger Futhark: Danish long-branch runes and Swedish/Norwegian short-twig runes

The long-branch runes are the following rune signs:

ᚠ	ᚢ	ᚦ	ᚬ	ᚱ	ᚴ	ᚼ	ᚾ	ᛁ	ᛅ	ᛋ	ᛏ	ᛒ	ᛘ	ᛚ	ᛦ
f	u	þ	ą	r	k	h	n	i	a	s	t	b	m	l	ʀ

=== Short-twig runes ===
In the short-twig runes (or Rök runes), nine runes appear as simplified variants of the long-branch runes, while the remaining seven have identical shapes:

ᚠ	ᚢ	ᚦ	ᚭ	ᚱ	ᚴ	ᚽ	ᚿ	ᛁ	ᛆ	ᛌ	ᛐ	ᛓ	ᛙ	ᛚ	ᛧ
f	u	þ	ą	r	k	h	n	i	a	s	t	b	m	l	ʀ

=== Hälsinge runes (staveless runes) ===
Staveless runes

Hälsinge runes are so named because in modern times they were first noticed in the Hälsingland region of Sweden. Later, other inscriptions with the same runes were found in other parts of Sweden. They were used between the 10th and 12th centuries. The runes seem to be a simplification of the Swedish–Norwegian runes and lack certain strokes, hence the name "staveless". They cover the same set of staves as the other Younger Futhark alphabets. This variant has no assigned Unicode range (as of Unicode 12.1).

== Descendant scripts ==
=== Medieval ===
Medieval runes

In the Middle Ages, the Younger Futhark in Scandinavia was expanded, so that it once more contained one sign for each phoneme of the old Norse language. Dotted variants of voiceless signs were introduced to denote the corresponding voiced consonants, or vice versa, voiceless variants of voiced consonants, and several new runes also appeared for vowel sounds. Inscriptions in medieval Scandinavian runes show a large number of variant rune-forms, and some letters, such as s, c and z, were often used interchangeably.

Medieval runes were in use until the 15th century. Of the total number of Norwegian runic inscriptions preserved today, most are medieval runes. Notably, more than 600 inscriptions using these runes have been discovered in Bergen since the 1950s, mostly on wooden sticks (the so-called Bryggen inscriptions). This indicates that runes were in common use side by side with the Latin alphabet for several centuries. Indeed, some of the medieval runic inscriptions are actually in the Latin language.

After the 15th century, interest in rune history and their use in magical processes grew in Iceland, with various studies beginning with Third Grammatical Icelandic Treatise - Málfræðinnar grundvǫllr. Publications written in Latin and Danish in the 1600s included works by Arngrímur Jónsson, Runólfur Jónsson and Olaus Wormius. Content from these along with Icelandic and Norwegian Rune Poems appeared frequently in subsequent manuscripts written in Iceland.

=== Early modern ===
According to Carl-Gustav Werner, "in the isolated province of Dalarna in Sweden a mix of runes and Latin letters developed". The Dalecarlian runes came into use in the early 16th century and remained in some use up to the 20th century. Some discussion remains on whether their use was an unbroken tradition throughout this period or whether people in the 19th and 20th centuries learned runes from books written on the subject. The character inventory is suitable for transcribing modern Swedish and the local Dalecarlian language.

== In modern culture ==
The logo of Bluetooth, derived from ᚼ and ᛒ.

The logo for the wireless communication technology Bluetooth is a bind rune merging ᚼ (hagall, H) and ᛒ (bjarkan, B), the initials of tenth-century Danish king Harald Bluetooth after whom the technology is named.

== See also ==
- Codex Sangallensis 878
- Cipher runes
