= Old Swedish =

Stages of Swedish language

- Svænska
- Region: Sweden coastal Finland and Estonia
- Era: Evolved into Modern Swedish by the 16th century
- Language family: Indo-European: Germanic; North Germanic; Old East Norse; Old Swedish
- Writing system: Latin, Runic

Language codes
- ISO 639-3: (covered by Old Norse non)
- Linguist List: non-swe
- Glottolog: None

Old Swedish (Modern Swedish: fornsvenska; Old Swedish: Svænska, 14th c.) is the broad name for the Old East Norse that was spoken in Sweden during the Middle Ages from the Viking Age to the 16th century, when Early Modern Swedish had taken over. It is traditionally split into three distinct stages:

- Runic Swedish (runsvenska) – the Swedish "Runic Old Norse" language, attested only in Runic inscriptions, spoken from about 800 until about 1250
- Early Old Swedish (klassisk fornsvenska) – the Swedish "Classical Old Norse" language, spoken from about 1250 (the Westrogothic law) until about 1350
- Late Old Swedish (yngre fornsvenska) – the Swedish "Middle Norse" language, spoken from about 1350 (the Magnus Eriksson's Country Law) until about 1550 (the Gustav Vasa Bible)

Old Swedish developed from Old East Norse, the eastern dialect of Old Norse. The earliest forms of the Swedish and Danish languages, spoken between the years 800 and 1100, were dialects of Old East Norse and are referred to as Runic Swedish and Runic Danish because at the time all texts were written in the runic alphabet. The differences were only minute, however, and the dialects truly began to diverge around the 12th century, becoming Old Swedish and Old Danish in the 13th century. It is not known when exactly Elfdalian began to diverge from Swedish.

Early Old Swedish was markedly different from modern Swedish in that it had a more complex case structure and had not yet experienced a reduction of the gender system and thus had three genders. Nouns, adjectives, pronouns and certain numerals were inflected in four cases: nominative, genitive, dative and accusative.

== Development ==
Prior to the 16th century, early Swedish language was really a vernacular of Old East Norse, not too different from Old Danish. Old Swedish dialect groups can be divided into Old Svealand Swedish (gammal sveamål), Old Geatish (gammal götska), and Old Dalecarlian (forndalska); by extension also Old Scanian (fornskånska), Old Gutnish (forngutniska), and Old Jamtish (fornjämtska), among more.

=== Proto-Swedish ===
Prior to Old Swedish, attested language in Sweden may be called Proto-Swedish (ursvenska; 550–800), although, it is hard to point out any real distinction compared to the other Proto-Norse dialects. Some have suggested an East/West North Germanic split in the 7th century, i.e. a Norwegian "Proto-West Norse" (urvästnordiska) and a Danish-Swedish "Proto-East Norse" (uröstnordiska).

=== Runic Swedish ===
Runic Swedish (runsvenska; 800–1250) is the earliest stage of the Old Swedish language, which is only attested through Runic inscriptions.

Runic Swedish may be divided into two sub-stages:

- Early Runic Swedish (äldre runsvenska) – the Swedish language attested in Younger Futhark, spoken between 800 to about 1000
- Late Runic Swedish (yngre runsvenska) – the Swedish language attested in Stung Futhark, spoken between 1000 to about 1250

Around the 11th century, the Swedish language goes through monophthongization, nasal vowel collapse, /ʀ/ merges with /r/, among more.

A late example of the Runic Swedish language is attested in the Latin alphabet, although copied from an unknown original by Olaus Petri in the early 16th century (found in his En Swensk Cröneka). It is a pre-Christian law fragment from around the 11th century, retroactively called the Heathen Law (hednalagen).

=== Early Old Swedish ===
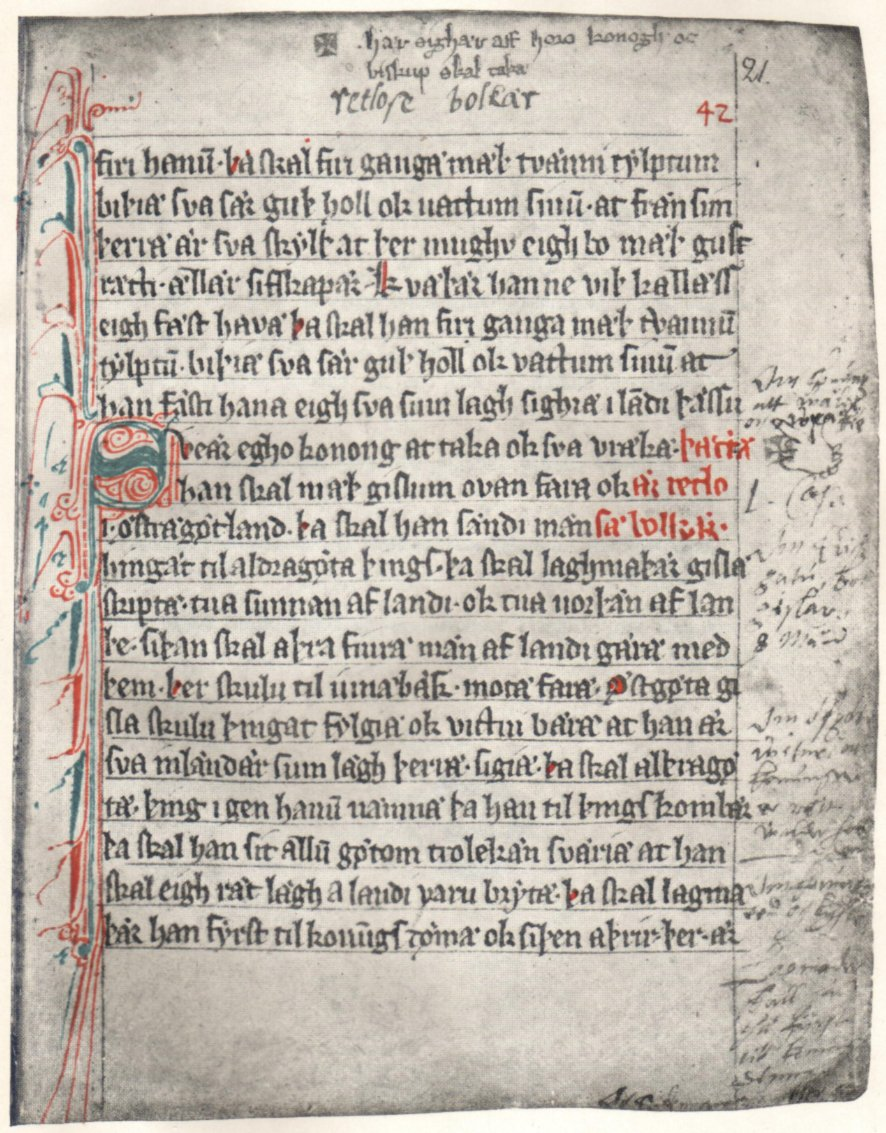
A page of the Äldre Västgötalagen (Westrogothic law), a law code used in Västergötland, from the 1280s

The writing of the Westrogothic law marked the beginning of Early Old Swedish (äldre fornsvenska, or Classical Old Swedish (klassisk fornsvenska; 1225–1375), which had developed from Old East Norse. It was the first Swedish language document written in the Latin alphabet, and its oldest fragments have been dated to around the year 1225.

Old Swedish was relatively stable during this period. The phonological and grammatical systems inherited from Old Norse were relatively well preserved and did not experience any major changes.

Most of the texts from the Early Old Swedish period were written in Latin, as it was the language of knowledge and the Church. However, Old Swedish was used as a literary language as well, and laws especially were written in it; of the 28 surviving manuscripts from this period, 24 contain law texts. Much of the knowledge of Old Swedish comes from these law texts. In addition to laws, some religious and poetic texts were also written in Old Swedish.

==== Loanwords ====
The Catholic Church and its various monastic orders introduced many new Greek and Latin loanwords into Old Swedish. Latin especially had an influence on the written language.

The Middle Low German language also influenced Old Swedish due to the economic and political power of the Hanseatic League during the 13th and 14th centuries. Accordingly, loanwords relating to warfare, trade, crafts and bureaucracy entered the Swedish language directly from Low German, along with some grammatical suffixes and conjunctions. The prefixes be-, ge- and för- that can be found in the beginning of modern Swedish words came from the Low German be-, ge- and vor-. Some words were replaced with new ones: the native word for window, vindøgha, was replaced with fönster, eldhus (kitchen) was replaced with kök and gælda (to pay) with betala. Some of these words still exist in Modern Swedish but are often considered archaic or dialectal; one example is the word vindöga (window). Many words related to seafaring were borrowed from Dutch.

It is speculated that the influence of Low German was so strong that it helped break down the inflectional system of Old Swedish.

=== Late Old Swedish ===
In contrast to the stable Early Old Swedish, Late Old Swedish (yngre fornsvenska), or Middle Swedish (medelsvenska; 1375–1526), experienced many changes, including a simplification of the grammatical system and a vowel shift, so that in the 16th century the language resembled modern Swedish more than before. The printing of the New Testament in Swedish in 1526 marked the starting point for modern Swedish.

In this period Old Swedish had taken in a large amount of new vocabulary primarily from Latin, Low German and Dutch. When the country became part of the Kalmar Union in 1397, many Danish scribes brought Danicisms into the written language.

== Orthography ==
Old Swedish used some letters that are no longer found in modern Swedish: ⟨æ⟩ and ⟨ø⟩ were used for modern ⟨ä⟩ and ⟨ö⟩ respectively, and ⟨þ⟩ could stand for both /ð/ (th as in that) and /θ/ (th as in thing). In the latter part of the 14th century ⟨þ⟩ was replaced with ⟨th⟩ and ⟨dh⟩.

The grapheme ⟨i⟩ could stand for both the phonemes /i/ and /j/ (e.g. siæl (soul), själ in modern Swedish). The graphemes ⟨u⟩, ⟨v⟩, and ⟨w⟩ were used interchangeably with the phonemes /w/ ~ /v/ and /u/ (e.g. vtan (without), utan in modern Swedish), and ⟨w⟩ could also sometimes stand for the consonant–vowel combinations /vu/ and /uv/: dwa (duva or dove).

Certain abbreviations were used in writing, such as mꝫ for meþ (modern med, with). The letter combinations ⟨aa⟩, ⟨ae⟩ and ⟨oe⟩ were often written so that one of the letters stood above the other as a smaller letter, ⟨aͣ⟩, ⟨aͤ⟩ and ⟨oͤ⟩, which led to the development of the modern letters ⟨å⟩, ⟨ä⟩, and ⟨ö⟩.

== Phonology ==
The root syllable length in Old Swedish could be short (VC), long (VːC, VCː) or overlong (VːCː). During the Late Old Swedish period the short root syllables (VC) were lengthened and the overlong root syllables (VːCː) were shortened, so modern Swedish only has the combinations VːC and VCː. Unlike in modern Swedish, a short vowel in Old Swedish did not entail a long consonant.

There were eight vowels in Early Old Swedish: /iː, yː, uː, oː, eː, aː, øː, ɛː/. A vowel shift (stora vokaldansen) occurred during the Late Old Swedish period, which had the following effects:

- [uː] became [ʉː] (hūs [huːs] > hus [hʉːs], house)
- [oː] became [uː] (bōk [boːk] > bok [buːk], book)
- [aː] became [oː] (blā [blaː] > blå [bloː], blue)

The consonant sounds were largely the same as in modern Swedish, with the notable exceptions of /ð/ and /θ/, which do not exist in modern Swedish (although the former is preserved in Elfdalian and to some extent also the latter). The Modern Swedish tje-sound ([ɕ]) and sje-sound ([ɧ]) were probably [t͡ʃ] and [ʃ], respectively, similar to their values in modern Finland Swedish. A similar change can be seen from Old Spanish [t͡s/d͡z] and [ʃ/ʒ] to Modern Spanish [s/θ] and [x].

The Proto-Germanic phoneme /w/ was preserved in initial sounds in Old Swedish (w-) and did survive in rural Swedish dialects in the provinces of Skåne, Halland, Västergötland and south of Bohuslän into the 18th, 19th and 20th centuries. It is still preserved in the Dalecarlian dialects in the province of Dalarna, Sweden. The /w/-phoneme did also occur after consonants (kw-, tw- etc.) in Old Swedish and did so into modern times in said dialects, as well as in the Westro- and North Bothnian tongues in northern Sweden.

== Grammar ==
=== Nominal morphology ===
==== In Early Old Swedish ====
The most defining difference between Old Swedish and modern Swedish was the more complex grammatical system of the former. In Old Swedish nouns, adjectives, pronouns and certain numerals were inflected in four cases (nominative, genitive, dative and accusative), whereas modern standard Swedish has reduced the case system to a common form and a genitive (some dialects retain distinct dative forms). There were also three grammatical genders (masculine, feminine and neuter), still retained in many dialects today, but now reduced to two in the standard language, where the masculine and feminine have merged. These features of Old Swedish are still found in modern Icelandic and Faroese; the noun declensions are almost identical.

Noun declensions fell under two categories: weak and strong. The weak masculine, feminine and neuter nouns had their own declensions and at least three groups of strong masculine nouns, three groups of strong feminine nouns and one group of strong neuter nouns can be identified. Below is an overview of the noun declension system:

The noun declension system

- Vowel stems (strong declension)
  - a-stems
    - a-stems
    - ja-stems
    - ia-stems
  - ō-stems
    - ō-stems
    - jō-stems
    - iō-stems
  - i-stems
  - u-stems
- Consonant n-stems (weak declension)
  - n-stems
    - an-stems
    - ōn, ūn-stems
    - īn-stems
- Consonant stems
  - monosyllabic stems
  - r-stems
  - nd-stems

Some noun paradigms of the words fisker (fish), sun (son), siang (bed), skip (ship), biti (bit) and vika (week):

	Masculine a-stems	Masculine u-stems	Feminine ō-stems	Neuter a-stems	Masculine an-stems	Feminine ōn-stems
Sg.Nom.	fisker	sun	siang	skip	biti	wika
Sg.Acc.	fisk	sun	siang	skip	bita	wiku
Sg.Gen.	fisks	sunar	siangar	skips	bita	wiku
Sg.Dat.	fiski	syni	siangu	skipi	bita	wiku
Pl.Nom.	fiskar	synir	siangar	skip	bitar	wikur
Pl.Acc.	fiska	syni	siangar	skip	bita	wikur
Pl.Gen.	fiska	suna	sianga	skipa	bita	wikna
Pl.Dat.	fiskum	sunum	siangum	skipum	bitum	wikum

==== In Late Old Swedish ====
By the year 1500 the number of cases in Old Swedish had been reduced from four (nominative, genitive, dative and accusative) to two (nominative and genitive).

Other major changes include the loss of a separate inflectional system for masculine and feminine nouns, pronouns and adjectives in the course of the 15th century, leaving only two genders in the standard Swedish language, although three genders are still common in many of the dialects. The old dative forms of the personal pronouns became the object forms (honom, henne, dem; him, her, them) and -s became more common as the ending for the genitive singular.

=== Adjectives ===
Adjectives and certain numerals were inflected according to the gender and case the noun they modified was in. Below is a table of the inflection of weak adjectives.

	Masculine	Feminine	Neuter
Singular nominative	-i, -e	-a, -æ	-a, -æ
Singular oblique	-a, -æ	-u, -o	-a, -æ
Plural	-u, -o		

=== Verbs ===
Verbs in Old Swedish were conjugated according to person and number. There were four weak verb conjugations and six groups of strong verbs. The difference between weak and strong verbs is in the way the past tense (preterite) is formed: strong verbs form it with a vowel shift in the root of the verb, while weak verbs form it with a dental suffix (þ, d or t).

==== Strong verbs ====
The verbs in the table below are bīta (bite), biūþa (offer), wærþa (become), stiæla (steal), mæta (measure) and fara (go).

Strong verbs
	I group	II group	III group	IV group	V group	VI group
Infinitive	bīta	biūþa	wærþa; warþa	st(i)æla	m(i)æta	fara
Past participle	bītin	buþin	(w)urþin	stulin; stolin	m(i)ætin	farin
Present participle	bītande	biūþande	wærþande	stiælande	mætande	farande
Indicative present
iak/jæk, þū, han/hōn/þæt	bīter	biūþer	wærþer	stiæler	mæter	farer
vī(r)	bītom	biūþom	wærþom	stiælom	mætom	farom
ī(r)	bītin	biūþin	wærþin	stiælin	mætin	farin
þē(r)/þā(r)/þē	bīta	biūþa	wærþa	stiæla	mæta	fara
Indicative preterite
iak/jæk, han/hōn/þæt	bēt	bøþ	warþ	stal	mat	fōr
þū	bētt	bøþt	warþt	stalt	mast	fōrt
vī(r)	bitum	buþum	(w)urþom	stālom	mātom	fōrom
ī(r)	bitin	buþin	(w)urþin	stālin	mātin	fōrin
þē(r)/þā(r)/þē	bitu	buþu	(w)urþo	stālo	māto	fōro
Conjunctive present, Imperative
iak/jæk, þū, han/hōn/þæt	bīte	biūþe	wærþe	stiæle	mæte	fare
vī(r)	bītom	biūþom	wærþom	stiælom	mætom	farom
ī(r), þē(r)/þā(r)/þē	bītin	biūþin	wærþin	stiælin	mætin	farin
Conjunctive preterite
iak/jæk, þū, han/hōn/þæt	biti	buþi	(w)urþe	stāle	māte	fōre
vī(r)	bitum	buþum	(w)urþom	stālom	mātom	fōrom
ī(r), þē(r)/þā(r)/þē	bitin	buþin	(w)urþin	stālin	mātin	fōrin

==== Weak verbs ====
Weak verbs are grouped into four classes:

- First conjugation: verbs ending in -a(r), -ā(r) in the present tense. Most verbs belong to this class.
- Second conjugation: verbs ending in -e(r), -æ(r) in the present tense.
- Third conjugation: verbs ending in -i(r), -ø(r) in the present tense.
- Fourth conjugation: these verbs have a more or less irregular conjugation. About twenty verbs belong to this class.

Inside the conjugation classes the weak verbs are also categorised into further three classes:

- I: those ending in -þe in the preterite
- II: those ending in -de in the preterite
- III: those ending in -te in the preterite

=== Syntax ===
Word order was less restricted in Old Swedish than modern Swedish due to complex verbal morphology. Both referential and nonreferential subjects could be left out as verbal structures already conveyed the necessary information, in much the same way as in languages such as Spanish and Latin.

In nominal phrases the genitive attribute could stand both before and after the word it modified, i.e. one could say his house or house his. The same was true for pronouns and adjectives (that house or house that; green pasture or pasture green). During the Late Old Swedish period the usage of the genitive attribute became increasingly more restricted, and it nearly always came to be placed before the word it modified, so in modern Swedish one would usually only say hans hus (his house), or in some dialects or manners of emphasis, huset hans, but almost never hus hans. However, this too has lived on in some dialects, like in Västgötska, where the use of mor din (mother yours) has been common. (Note: In Västgötska, molin can also be used instead of mor din. Västgötska words and expressions (Swedish))

=== Personal pronouns ===
Below is a table of the Old Swedish personal pronouns:

	Singular					Plural				
	1st person	2nd person	3rd person			1st person	2nd person	3rd person		
	1st person	2nd person	masc.	fem.	neut.	1st person	2nd person	masc.	fem.	neut.
Nominative	iak, jæk	þu	han	hon	þæt	wi(r)	i(r)	þe(r)	þa(r)	þe, þøn
Accusative	mik	þik	han	hana	þæt	os	iþer	þa	þa(r)	þe, þøn
Dative	mæ(r)	þæ(r)	hanum	hænni	þy	os	iþer	þem		
Genitive	min	þin	hans	hænna(r)	þæs	war(a)	iþer, iþra	þera		

=== Numerals ===
The Old Swedish cardinal numbers are as follows. Numbers from one to four decline in the nominative, genitive, dative and accusative cases and in all three genders (masculine, feminine and neuter); here the nominative forms are given. Numbers above four are indeclinable.

	Old Swedish	Modern Swedish		Old Swedish	Modern Swedish
1	ēn, ēn, ēt	en, (dialectal f. e, ena), ett	11	ællivu	elva
2	twē(r), twār, tū	två, tu	12	tolf	tolv
3	þrī(r), þrēa(r), þrȳ	tre	13	þrættān	tretton
4	fiūri(r), fiūra(r), fiughur	fyra	14	fiughurtān	fjorton
5	fǣm	fem	15	fǣm(p)tan	femton
6	sæx	sex	16	sæxtān	sexton
7	siū	sju	17	siūtān	sjutton
8	ātta	åtta	18	atertān	arton (archaic aderton)
9	nīo	nio	19	nītān	nitton
10	tīo	tio	20	tiughu	tjugo

The higher numbers are as follows. The numbers 21–29, 31–39, and so on are formed in the following way: ēn (twēr, þrīr, etc.) ok tiughu, ēn ok þrǣtighi, etc.

	Old Swedish	Modern Swedish		Old Swedish	Modern Swedish
30	þrǣtighi	trettio	70	siūtighi	sjuttio
31	ēn ok þrǣtighi	trettioett	80	āttatighi	åttio
40	fiūratighi	fyrtio	90	nīotighi	nittio
50	fǣmtighi	femtio	100	hundraþ	hundra
60	s(i)æxtighi	sextio	1000	þūsand	tusen

== Examples ==
=== Västgötalagen ===
This is an extract from the Westrogothic law (Västgötalagen), which is the oldest continuous text written in the Swedish language, and was compiled during the early 13th century. The text marks the beginning of Old Swedish.

Dræpær maþar svænskan man eller smalenskæn, innan konongsrikis man, eigh væstgøskan, bøte firi atta ørtogher ok þrettan markær ok ænga ætar bot. [...] Dræpar maþær danskan man allæ noræn man, bøte niv markum. Dræpær maþær vtlænskan man, eigh ma frid flyia or landi sinu oc j æth hans. Dræpær maþær vtlænskæn prest, bøte sva mykit firi sum hærlænskan man. Præstær skal i bondalaghum væræ. Varþær suþærman dræpin ællær ænskær maþær, ta skal bøta firi marchum fiurum þem sakinæ søkir, ok tvar marchar konongi.

Modern Swedish:

Dräper man en svensk eller en smålänning, en man ifrån konungariket, men ej en västgöte, så bötar man tretton marker och åtta örtugar, men ingen mansbot. [...] Dräper man en dansk eller en norrman bötar man nio marker. Dräper man en utländsk man, skall man inte bannlysas utan förvisas till sin ätt. Dräper man en utländsk präst bötar man lika mycket som för en landsman. En präst räknas som en fri man. Om en sörlänning dräps eller en engelsman, skall han böta fyra marker till målsäganden och två marker till konungen.

English:

If someone slays a Swede or a Smålander, a man from the kingdom, but not a West Geat, he will pay eight örtugar and thirteen marks, but no wergild. [...] If someone slays a Dane or a Norwegian, he will pay nine marks. If someone slays a foreigner, he shall not be banished and have to flee to his clan. If someone slays a foreign priest, he will pay as much as for a fellow countryman. A priest counts as a free man. If a Southerner is slain or an Englishman, he shall pay four marks to the plaintiff and two marks to the king.

=== The Life of Saint Eric ===
This text about Eric IX (ca. 1120–1160) can be found in the Codex Bureanus, a collection of Old Swedish manuscripts from the mid-14th century.

Hǣr viliom wī medh Gudz nādhom sighia medh faam ordhom aff thø̄m hælgha Gudz martire Sancto Ĕrīco, som fordum war konungher ī Swērīke. Bādhe aff ǣt ok ædle han war swā fast aff konunga slækt som aff androm Swērīkis høfdingiom. Sidhan rīkit var v̄tan forman, ok han var kiǣr allom lanzins høfdingiom ok allom almōganom, thā valdo thē han til konungh medh allom almōghans gōdhwilia, ok sattis hedherlīca ā konungx stool vidh Upsala.

Translation:

Here we want to say with God's grace a few words about that holy God's martyr Saint Eric, who was earlier the King of Sweden. In both heritage and nobility he was fastly of royal extraction as other Swedish leaders. Since the realm was without a leader and he was beloved by all of the land's nobility and all of the common people, the commoners chose him as King with all of their good will, and sat him reverentially on the King's throne at Uppsala.

== See also ==
- Old Norse
- Old Norwegian
- Old Gutnish

== Bibliography ==
- Bergman, Gösta.Kortfattad svensk språkhistoria. Prisma 1980.
- Kirro, Arto; Himanen, Ritva. Textkurs i fornsvenska. Universitetet 1988.
- Noreen, Adolf. Altschwedische Grammatik. 1904.
- Wessén, Elias. Fornsvenska texter: med förklaringar och ordlista. Läromedelsförlagen, Svenska bokförlagen 1969.
