= Modern Swedish =

Modern form of the Swedish language

- nysvenska
- Region: Sweden, Finland, Saint Barthélemy and Estonia
- Era: developed into contemporary Swedish by the late 19th century
- Language family: Indo-European: Germanic; North Germanic; East Scandinavian; Modern Swedish
- Early form: Old Swedish

Language codes
- ISO 639-3: –
- Glottolog: None

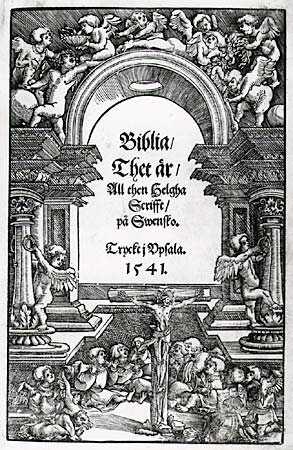
Gustav Vasa Bible in 1541 was the first complete Swedish translation of the Bible.

Modern Swedish (Swedish: nysvenska) is the linguistic term used for the Swedish language from the Bible translation of 1526 to the development of a common national language around 1880. The period can further be divided into Early Modern Swedish (1526–1750) and Late Modern Swedish (1750–1880).

== Early Modern Swedish ==
=== Bible ===
Early Modern Swedish was established in 1526 with a complete Swedish translation of the Bible. The translation followed the spoken word rather closely, as opposed to the more Latin-inspired way of writing commonly used in the Middle Ages.

The Vasa Bible is considered to be a reasonable compromise between old and new; while not adhering to the spoken language of its day it was not overly conservative in its use of old forms. Though it was not completely consistent in spelling, particularly when it came to vowels, it was a major step towards a more consistent Swedish orthography. It established the use of the letters "ä" and "ö" in place of the older "æ" and "ø" and introduced the completely new "å" in place of "o" in many words. It also introduced conventions such as using ck instead of kk in words like tacka; "thank". The ongoing rivalry with Denmark can be argued to have some influence on the new translation, with infinitive suffixes like -a being favored over the -e more typical of Danish. While the influence of individual translators should not be exaggerated, the fact that all three came from provinces in central Sweden (Andreæ was from Västmanland and the Petri brothers were from Närke) is generally seen as adding specific Central Swedish features to the new Bible as well as the fact that the royal printing house was situated in Stockholm. Though it might seem as if the Bible translation set a very powerful precedent for orthographic standards, spelling actually became more inconsistent in the following century. It was not until the end of the 17th century that the issue started being discussed, around the time when the first grammars were written. Some important changes in sound during the Modern Swedish period were the gradual assimilation of several different consonant clusters into /ɧ/ and the softening of /g/ and /k/ into /ʝ/ and /ɕ/ before frontal vowels.

The 16th century was further marked by inconsistencies in the Swedish language throughout the country. Some regions did not adhere to the standards the Bible used and continued to use their old way of writing. Books printed in Swedish were scarce. Most were theological texts intended to spread the Lutheran doctrines through Sweden.

Also of importance were the national hymnals. A first draft was created in the 1530s. These set the mark for young people as they sang the hymns in Church.

=== 17th century ===
In the 17th century there were attempts to establish Swedish as a genuine language. An early linguist and author was Georg Stiernhielm, who is today almost universally labelled "Father of Swedish Poetry". He was the first to introduce the hexameter into the Swedish language with his epic Hercules in 1658. The hexameter is used in the Latin language and is sometimes considered unsuitable for Germanic languages because of the differences in prosody. However, it had been adapted to German and English more than a century earlier with the alternating long and short syllables of Latin being replaced with stressed and unstressed syllables of the Germanic languages. The hexameter would later be used by many other Swedish poets.

Stiernhielm was a learned man, and has been labelled the most knowledgeable man in Sweden of his time. He was probably the first to be so fascinated by the Norse languages, and spent much labor tracing the similarities between Icelandic and old Swedish. Realizing the common inheritance they shared, he traced their origin from ancient times, descending them from a Biblical tribe.

== Late Modern Swedish ==
Late Modern Swedish is considered to have begun in 1732 when Olof von Dalin published the weekly publication "The Swedish Argus" in Stockholm. It dealt with current events in Sweden, mainly Stockholm with its population of 50,000, in a publicly appealing way. Often it used irony and satire to portray royalty and other notable people.

This popular style characterizes the entire period. Bellman was a Stockholm poet of the late 18th century whose poetry represented the drinking habits of the time.

Around the 18th Century, French also gained status and became an important source of loanwords, particularly among the upper classes.

In 1825 a professor of Lund University and later Bishop of Växjö, Esaias Tegnér, published Fritiof's Saga, a Viking epic directed to a general audience. It gained great popularity and was later set to music and sung in the homes of the Swedish middle class. It was reprinted several times in the 19th century, up until the 1880s when the newer realistic poetry set the mark with names such as Strindberg.

== See also ==
- Old Norse
- Swedish literature
