= Olaus Verelius =

Swedish scholar (1618–1682)

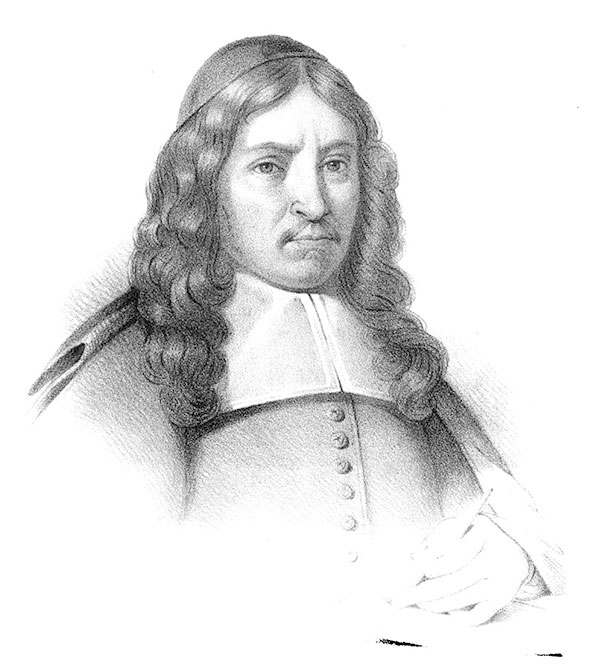
Olaus Verelius

Olaus or Olof Verelius (12 February 1618 – 3 January 1682) was a Swedish scholar of Northern antiquities who published the first edition of a saga and the first Old Norse-Swedish dictionary and is held to have been the founder of the Hyperborean School which led to Gothicism.

== Life and career ==
He was born in Häsleby parish in Jönköping County, to the pastor Nicolaus Petri and his wife, Botilda Olofsdotter, but adopted the surname Verelius in his youth. He studied at Dorpat (now Tartu, Estonia) in 1633 and Uppsala in 1638, was given a position as tutor to youths of noble birth by Axel Oxenstierna, and in 1648–50 took a tour abroad on which he made a speech in Leiden about the Peace of Westphalia and in Paris on the occasion of the coronation of Queen Christina.

Verelius was named to a professorship of Rhetoric at Dorpat in 1652 but never took it up; instead, in 1653 he became steward of the academy at Uppsala, a position which he held until 1657, when he took a teaching position in history. In 1662 he took up the chair in Swedish antiquities at Uppsala University which had been created especially for him. In 1666 he also became national archivist, and assessor in the newly founded College of Antiquaries (Swedish: Antikvitetskollegium). In 1675 and 1679 respectively, he resigned those positions. In 1679, while retaining his professorship, he became university librarian. He died in Uppsala on 3 January 1682.

== Works ==
The Icelandic student Jón Rúgman Jónsson, who had been intending to study in Copenhagen but ended up in Sweden, had brought a number of saga texts to Uppsala; he had copied them as leisure reading. With his uncredited assistance in translation, in 1664 Verelius published the first edition of an Icelandic saga, together with a Swedish translation: Gautreks saga, under the title Gothrici & Rolfi Westrogothiæ regum historia lingua antiqua Gothica conscripta. This was followed by Herrauds och Bosa saga (Bósa saga ok Herrauðs) in 1666 and Hervarar saga (Hervarar saga ok Heiðreks) in 1672. Verelius also wrote the first Old Norse dictionary by a non-Icelander, Index linguæ veteris scytho-scandicæ sive gothicæ, begun in 1681 and published after his death by Olaus Rudbeck in 1691. He was probably best known abroad for this and the Hervarar saga.

In 1675, he published a handbook of Swedish runic inscriptions, in Latin and Swedish, Manuductio ad runographiam. This continued Johannes Bureus' research into the runes and was a significant work, although limited by, for example, the assumption that the runes could be derived from the Greek alphabet.

On his return from his foreign tour, Verelius had written Epitomarum Historiæ Svio-Gothicæ libri quattuor et Gothorum extra patrium gestarum libri duo, a highly patriotic view of ancient Swedish history. This was published in 1730 and became popular as a reader because of its good Latin.

== Views and controversies ==
Verelius is counted the founder of the Hyperborean School in Swedish scholarship, which took the view that the Goths of Gotland were the people referred to as Hyperboreans in Greek literature; this gave rise to Gothicism and Verelius' student Rudbeck became its most prominent proponent.

From 1672 to 1681 he and Johannes Schefferus disputed bitterly over the site of the heathen temple at Uppsala. Schefferus argued in Upsalia, published in 1666, that the temple had been located in the centre of the modern town. Verelius disputed this in his notes to Hervarar saga, arguing that the temple had been on the site of the church at Gamla Uppsala. In 1678, Verelius published excerpts from Bishop Karl's Chronicle in support of his view, but the document was a forgery, although Verelius and Rudbeck may not have known this. In any event Verelius' view on the location, although based less on sober scholarship than Schefferus'— he considered wrongly for instance that the tower of the church at Gamla Uppsala to predate Christianity and be identical with the temple — has proven correct.
