= Seax of Beagnoth =

10th century Anglo-Saxon seax

Coordinates: 51.484202°N 0.143874°W

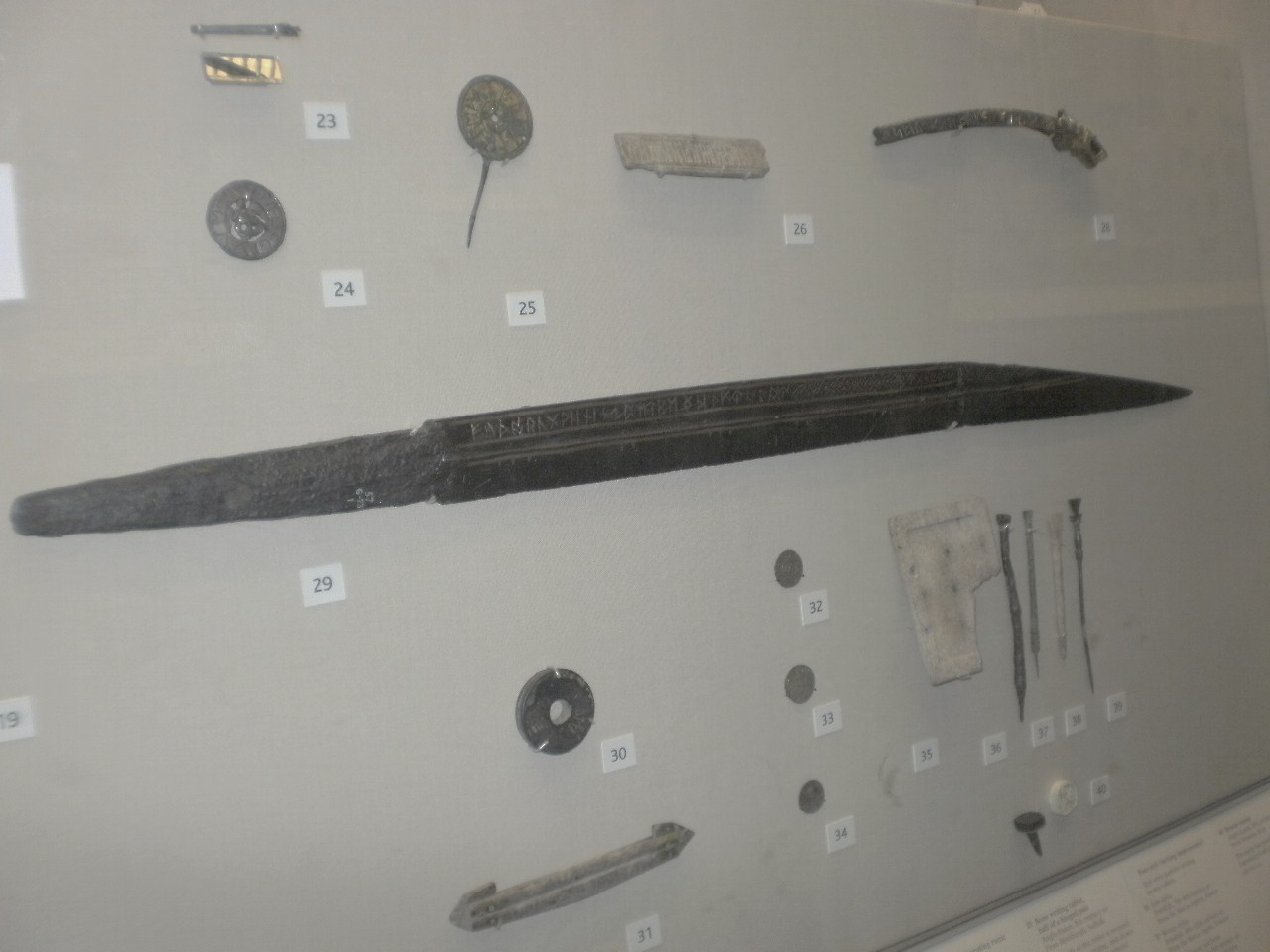
- The Seax of Beagnoth on display at the British Museum
- Material: Iron (inlaid with copper, brass and silver)
- Size: Length: 72.1 cm (28.4 in); Width: 38.7 mm (1.52 in); Thickness: 8.2 mm (0.32 in)
- Weight: 985 g (34.7 oz)
- Writing: Runic, Old English
- Created: 10th century
- Period/culture: Late Anglo-Saxon
- Discovered: 1857; River Thames, Battersea
- Present location: Room 41, British Museum, London
- Registration: 1857,0623.1

The Seax of Beagnoth, also known as the Thames scramasax, is a 10th-century Anglo-Saxon seax (single-edged knife). It was found in the inland estuary of the Thames in 1857, and is now at the British Museum in London. It is a prestige weapon, decorated with elaborate patterns of inlaid copper, brass and silver wire. On one side of the blade is the only known complete inscription of the twenty-eight letter Anglo-Saxon runic alphabet, as well as the name "Beagnoth" in runic letters. It is thought that the runic alphabet had a magical function, and that the name Beagnoth is that of either the owner of the weapon or the smith who forged it. Although many Anglo-Saxon and Viking swords and knives have inscriptions in the Latin alphabet on their blades, or have runic inscriptions on the hilt or scabbard, the Seax of Beagnoth is one of only a handful of finds with a runic inscription on its blade.

== Discovery ==
Henry J. Briggs, a labourer, found the seax in the inland estuary of the Thames near Battersea in early 1857. (Note: Briggs sold many archaeological finds from the Thames mud to the British Museum between 1843 and 1866, including the Battersea Shield.) Briggs sold it to the British Museum, and on 21 May 1857 it was exhibited at the Society of Antiquaries of London by Augustus Wollaston Franks (an antiquary who worked at the Antiquities Department of the British Museum), when it was described as "resembling the Scramasax of the Franks, of which examples are very rare in England; and bears a row of runic characters inlaid in gold". Since then the weapon has usually been called the Thames scramasax; but the term scramasax (from Old Frankish *scrâmasahs) is only attested once, in the History of the Franks by Gregory of Tours, and the meaning of the scrama- element is uncertain, so recent scholarship prefers the term long seax or long sax for this type of weapon.

== Description ==
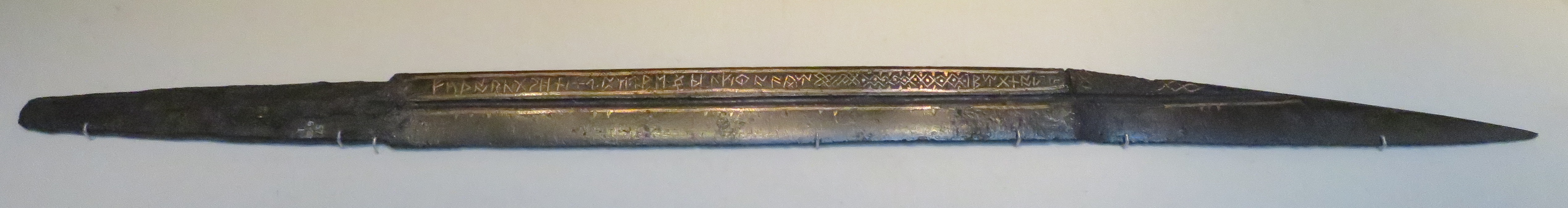

The seax is an iron knife with a single cutting edge and a long tapering point. It is 72.1 cm (28.4 in) in length, of which the tang is 17 cm (6.7 in) and the blade is 55.1 cm (21.7 in). The tang would have been attached to a handle, which has not survived.

The blade is a prestige weapon, decorated on both faces with geometric patterns created by hammering strips of twisted copper, brass and silver wire into grooves cut into the blade, as well as with inlaid triangles and lozenges of copper, brass and silver. The technique of inlaying wire to create decorative patterns and inscriptions was widely used on Germanic and Anglo-Saxon seaxes and spear heads from the 9th and 10th centuries, and is also found on Viking swords from about the same period.

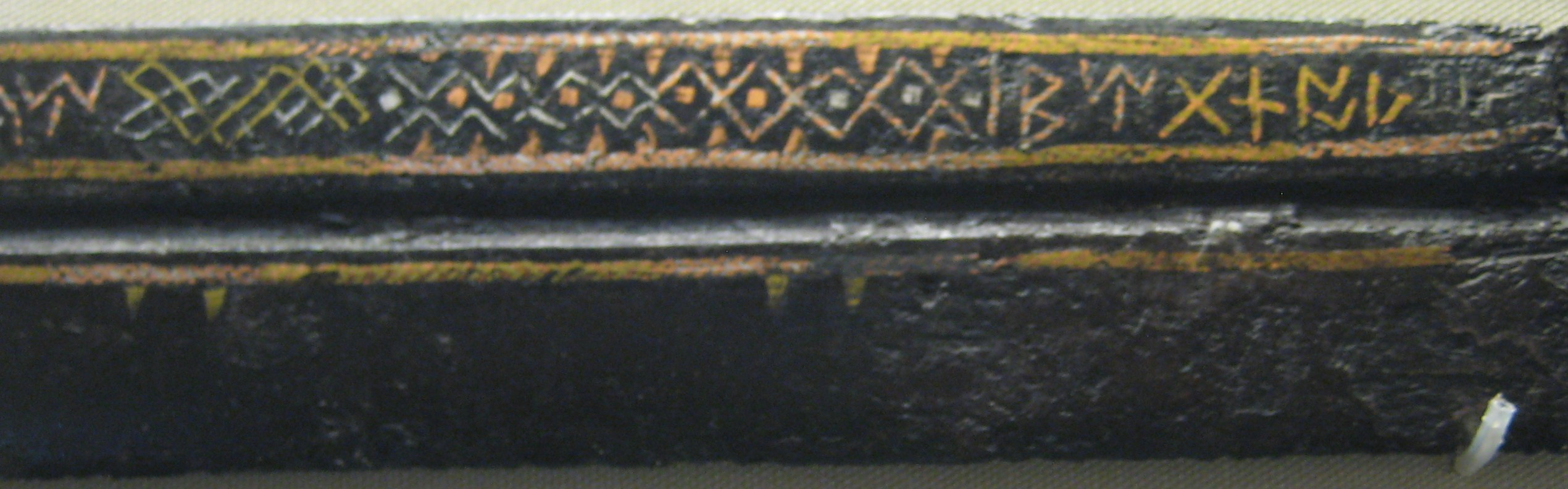
Detail of the Seax of Beagnoth, showing the inlaid wire decoration between the two inscriptions

On both sides of the seax is a deep median groove running the length of the blade, above which is a long rectangular panel bordered at the top and bottom with inlaid copper strips. The panel on one side of the seax is filled with a lozenge pattern in silver and copper, which may have been meant to simulate pattern welding. The panel on the other side bears two runic inscriptions inlaid with brass and silver wire. The inscription on the left comprises the twenty-eight letters of the Anglo-Saxon runic alphabet or futhorc. The inscription on the right, separated from the other by a herringbone design in silver and brass, is the male personal name Beagnoþ or Beagnoth ᛒᛠᚷᚾᚩᚦ, which is assumed to be that of the maker or original owner of the blade.

== Epigraphy ==
The inscription of the futhorc is as follows:

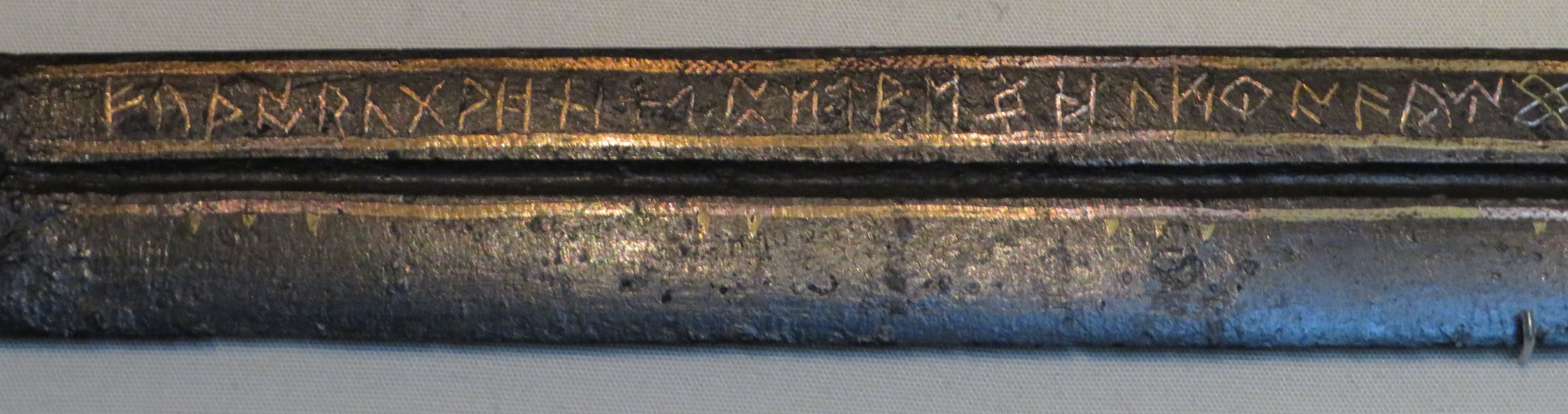

Order on Seax	Standard rune	UCS	Old English name	Transliteration (Note: The system of runic transliteration used is that given in Page 1987, p. 19.)	Order in Vienna Codex
1		ᚠ	feoh	f	1
2		ᚢ	ur	u	2
3		ᚦ	þorn	þ	3
4		ᚩ	ós	o	4
5		ᚱ	rad	r	5
6		ᚳ	cen	c	6
7		ᚷ	gyfu	g	7
8		ᚹ	wynn	w	8
9		ᚻ	hægl	h	9
10		ᚾ	nyd	n	10
11		ᛁ	is	i	11
12		ᛄ	ger	j	12
13		ᛇ	eoh	ɨ	13
14		ᛈ	peorð	p	14
15		ᛉ	eolh	x	15
16		ᛋ	sigel (written as ᚴ, see below)	s	16
17		ᛏ	Tiw	t	17
18		ᛒ	beorc	b	18
19		ᛖ	eh	e	19
20		ᛝ	ing	ŋ	22
21		ᛞ	dæg	d	23
22		ᛚ	lagu	l	21
23		ᛗ	mann	m	20
24		ᛟ	eþel (written as the "lantern rune")	œ	24
25		ᚪ	ac	a	25
26		ᚫ	æsc	æ	26
27		ᚣ	yr	y	28
28		ᛠ	ear	ea	27

There are a number of unusual features about this inscription. Firstly, the order of the runes does not exactly match the traditional sequence of the earlier twenty-four letter runic alphabet or that of the twenty-eight letter Anglo-Saxon futhorc preserved in the Vienna Codex. The first nineteen runes are in the correct order, but the next four (20–23: ᛝᛞᛚᛗ) are in a confused sequence which does not match that found in any other source. The last two runes (27–28: ᚣᛠ) are swapped with regard to their order in the Vienna Codex, but as these are later additions to the original twenty-four letter runic alphabet their order may have been less stable, especially as the last letter ᛠ is very rare in Anglo-Saxon inscriptions (elsewhere it occurs in the name Jɨslheard ᛄᛇᛋᛚᚻᛠᚱᛞ on a stone found in Dover).

Secondly, the 16th rune (ᛋ) is very small, and appears to have been squeezed in as an afterthought.

Thirdly, the letterforms of a number of the runes are unusual:

- No.12 ᛄ ger is written in an unusual form, with a single horizontal bar instead of the circle, lozenge or cross most commonly found in other epigraphic and manuscript examples.
- No.16 ᛋ is written in an unusual form, but one that is attested in a few other inscriptions (for example on the shrine of Saint Cuthbert). Some scholars believe this runic letterform is borrowed from the insular letter s ꞅ used in Anglo-Saxon bookhand as it has a very similar shape (both have a vertical stem with a horizontal or diagonal branch to the right). On the other hand, Elliot sees it as an evolution of the normal runic letter by straightening the left branching stroke and mirroring the letter.
- No.21 ᛞ is written in a unique form with the two diagonal crossbars forming a triangle rather than crossing in the middle. This is probably an aberrant form.
- No.24 ᛟ is written in an unusual form with a single vertical stem instead of two diagonal legs as is normally the case. This form occurs occasionally in runic inscriptions, and more often in manuscript texts. Ralph Elliott, former professor of English at the University of Adelaide, suggests that it represents a simplified form of the standard rune.
- No.27 ᚣ is written in an unusual form with a cross in the centre rather than a vertical stroke.

These peculiarities may indicate that the artisan who designed the inscription was unfamiliar with runic writing, although perhaps some of the unusual letterforms may have been errors occasioned by the difficulty of inlaying wire to form runes.

The inscription of the name Beagnoth is as follows:

There are no unusual features in the inscription of the name, but at the top right of the name are two strange designs that almost look like letters, which no-one has been able to explain.

== Date and provenance ==
Finds of seaxes in Europe range from the 5th to the 11th century, and the earliest examples in England are from 7th-century graves. Isolated finds of seaxes in England are believed to date from the 9th and 10th centuries. The Seax of Beagnoth has been dated to the 10th century.

Several seaxes of a similar kind are known from southern England (three from London, one from Suffolk, one from the River Thames at Keen Edge Ferry in Berkshire), and one from Hurbuck in County Durham in the north of England. The Berkshire seax is so similar in construction and design to the Seax of Beagnoth that both may have come from the same workshop.

Elliott suggests a southern, presumably Kentish, origin for the seax because its inscription is composed of only the original twenty-eight letters of the Anglo-Saxon futhorc, and does not include any of the additional letters in use in Northumbrian runic inscriptions at that time.

The name Beagnoth inscribed on the seax also supports a Kentish provenance, as the only two examples of this name in manuscript sources are Kentish. One Beagnoth was a witness to a charter (S30) by King Eardwulf of Kent, granting pasture rights to the church of St Andrew at Rochester, Kent, which is dated to 748–760, and another Beagnoth (also spelled Beahnoþ) was a monk from Kent who was present at the Synod of Clovesho in 803 and witnessed a charter by King Æthelwulf of Wessex dated to 844. The name "Beagnoth" derives from the Old English words bēag or bēah meaning "ring, bracelet, torque or crown" and nōþ meaning "boldness", and can be translated as "Ringbold".

== Significance ==
The Seax of Beagnoth is significant both as a rare example of a runic-inscribed Anglo-Saxon weapon, and specifically for its runic inscription, which is a unique epigraphical example of the complete twenty-eight letter Anglo-Saxon futhorc.

=== Runic inscribed blades ===
There was a widespread tradition throughout Northern Europe of inscribing runes on weapons, particularly swords. Thus, in Stanza 6 of the eddaic poem Sigrdrífumál the valkyrie Sigrdrífa teaches the hero Sigurd how to engrave runes on his sword to provide magical protection:

"Sigrúnar þú skalt kunna, ef þú vilt sigr hafa, ok rísta á hialti hiǫrs, sumar á véttrimum, sumar á valbǫstum, ok nefna tysvar Tý"	"Victory runes you must know if you will have victory, and carve the on the sword's hilt, some on the grasp and some on the inlay, and name Tyr twice."

This poem was not committed to writing until the late 13th century (in the Codex Regius), although it may preserve elements from a much earlier date. However, a similar admonition to carve runes on swords is found in lines 1694–1698 of the Old English poem Beowulf, which is roughly contemporary with the Seax of Beagnoth:

"Swā wæs on ðǣm scennum scīran goldes þurh rūn‐stafas rihte gemearcod, geseted and gesǣd, hwām þæt sweord geworht, īrena cyst ǣrest wǣre, wreoþen‐hilt ond wyrm‐fāh."	"On clear gold labels let into the cross-piece it was rightly told in runic letters, set down and sealed, for whose sake it was that the sword was first forged, that finest of iron, spiral-hilted, serpent-bladed."

This poem mentions the practice of carving the sword-owner's name in runes on the hilt. This practice is confirmed by a 6th-century sword pommel from Kent, as well as a 6th-century silver scabbard mouth-piece from Chessell Down, Isle of Wight, which both preserve fragmentary runic inscriptions. The latter is the only known example of an Anglo-Saxon runic inscription on a weapon from outside Kent. Several other Anglo-Saxon weapons have isolated runic letters on them. For example, a tiw rune ᛏ, symbolizing the Anglo-Saxon war god Tiw (Tyr in the earlier quotation from the Sigrdrífumál), is found on two sword-pommels and a spear blade, all from Kent. Thus, although some Anglo-Saxon runic inscriptions on weapons are known, none are as extensive or as prominent as the runic inscription on the Seax of Beagnoth. Furthermore, the Seax of Beagnoth is the only known Anglo-Saxon weapon with a runic inscription on its blade, and indeed, other than the Schretzheim sword, which has a cryptic runic inscription on its blade consisting of four runes in a cross formation, there are no other certain examples from anywhere in Europe of a sword or knife blade with a runic inscription. In contrast, inscriptions in the Latin alphabet occur frequently on Viking swords. For example, some one hundred swords with the maker's name "Ulfberht" inlaid into the blade are known from a period of about 300 years.

On the basis of the Beowulf quotation it may be that "Beagnoth" was the Seax's original owner's name. However, that is not certain, as Viking and Anglo-Saxon weapons often have the name of the weapon's maker engraved on them instead of, or as well as, the owner's (as on the Sittingbourne seax shown below). Raymond Page, former Elrington and Bosworth Professor of Anglo-Saxon at the University of Cambridge, considers four possibilities:

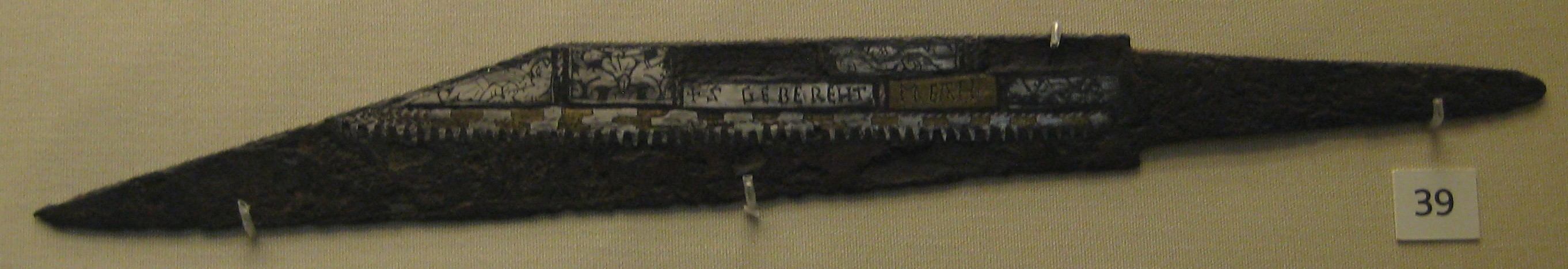
A "broken-back" seax from Sittingbourne in Kent, inscribed in Insular majuscules ☩ BIORHTELM ME WORTE ("Biorhtelm made me") and ☩ S[I]GEBEREHT ME AH ("S[i]gebereht owns me").

1. That the name is that of the smith who forged the seax, as swords from the Dark Ages often had their maker's name engraved on them.
2. That the name is that of the rune-master who wrote the futhorc. Page supposes that adding the rune-master's name would have added extra magical power to the weapon.
3. That the name is that of the original owner of the seax, for as he notes, "[t]he scramasax is an impressive piece of equipment, one that an owner would be proud to see his name on".
4. That the name is that of someone who gave the seax as a present to someone else, for it is "distinguished enough to make a fine gift bearing the giver's name".

Page concludes that we cannot know which possibility is correct.

=== The inscribed futhorc ===
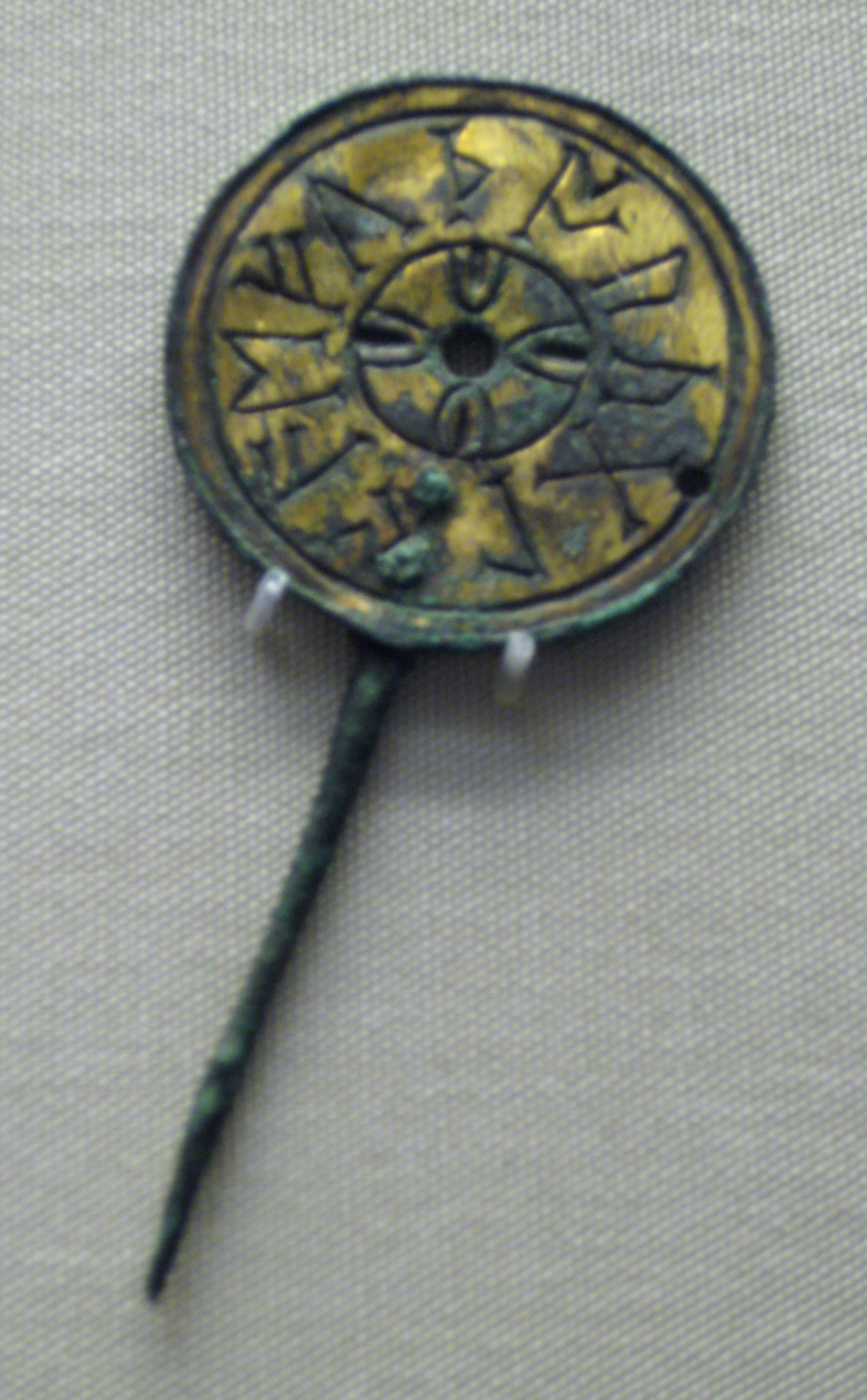
Anglo-Saxon disc-headed pin from Malton, North Yorkshire, engraved with the first seven or eight letters of the futhorc, (Note: According to Page 1999, the eighth letter lagu ᛚ may be an error for the similar-looking letter wynn ᚹ, which is the eighth letter of the futhorc.) followed by the three vowel letters (ᚠᚢᚦᚩᚱᚳᚷᛚᚪᚫᛖ).

The runic inscription on the seax not only identifies the maker or owner of the seax, but also provides a rare example of the twenty-eight letter Anglo-Saxon runic alphabet. Examples of the earlier, twenty-four letter Elder Futhark and sixteen letter Younger Futhark alphabets are relatively common in continental and Scandinavian runic inscriptions, but inscriptions of the historically later Anglo-Saxon futhorc are rare in England, with most examples of the Anglo-Saxon futhorc being known from manuscript sources. This seax represents the only known epigraphic inscription of the basic twenty-eight letter Anglo-Saxon runic alphabet, although an incomplete inscription of the first sixteen letters of the futhorc occurs on the disc-shaped head of a Middle Saxon pin from Brandon, Suffolk, and the first seven or eight letters of the futhorc are inscribed on the head of a pin from Malton, North Yorkshire.

It is unclear what purpose the inscription of the futhorc served, but Page suggests it cannot be simply decorative, but must have had a magical significance. He notes that the carving of runic letters on swords as a form of magical protection was an ancient practice, but by the 9th century rune lore was probably on the decline in the Kingdom of Kent, and the owner of the seax may have commissioned an archaic runic inscription for prestige purposes. The fact that there are errors in the order and design of the runic letters suggests that the smith who made the seax was not used to adding such runic inscriptions to the weapons he made, and they may have been copied inaccurately from a manuscript text.

== See also ==
- Anglo-Saxon art
- Franks Casket
- Viking Age arms and armour
- Wetlands and islands in Germanic paganism
