= Raymond Page =

Raymond Page may refer to:

- R. I. Page (1924–2012), British historian
- Raymond E. Page (1895–1992), American landscape architect
