= Gothic writing =

Gothic writing may refer to

- Writing in a Gothic language
- Writing using a Greek and runic based Gothic alphabet
- Writing using a Blackletter Gothic script for Latin-based alphabets
- 18th century and later Gothic fiction combining horror and romance
