= Graymoor =

Graymoor or Greymoor may refer to:

- Graymoor, New York, a hamlet in Philipstown, New York, United States
- Graymoor-Devondale, Kentucky, a home rule-class city in Jefferson County, Kentucky, United States
- Greymoor, an expansion pack for the massively multiplayer online role-playing game The Elder Scrolls Online
- Greymoor Hill Ring, an Anglo-Saxon runic ring
- Society of the Atonement (also Graymoor Friars and Sisters), a Franciscan religious congregation in the Catholic Church
