= Anglo-Saxon runes =

Symbols used in the writing system of early Frisians and Anglo-Saxon peoples

Futhorc ᚠᚢᚦᚩᚱᚳ
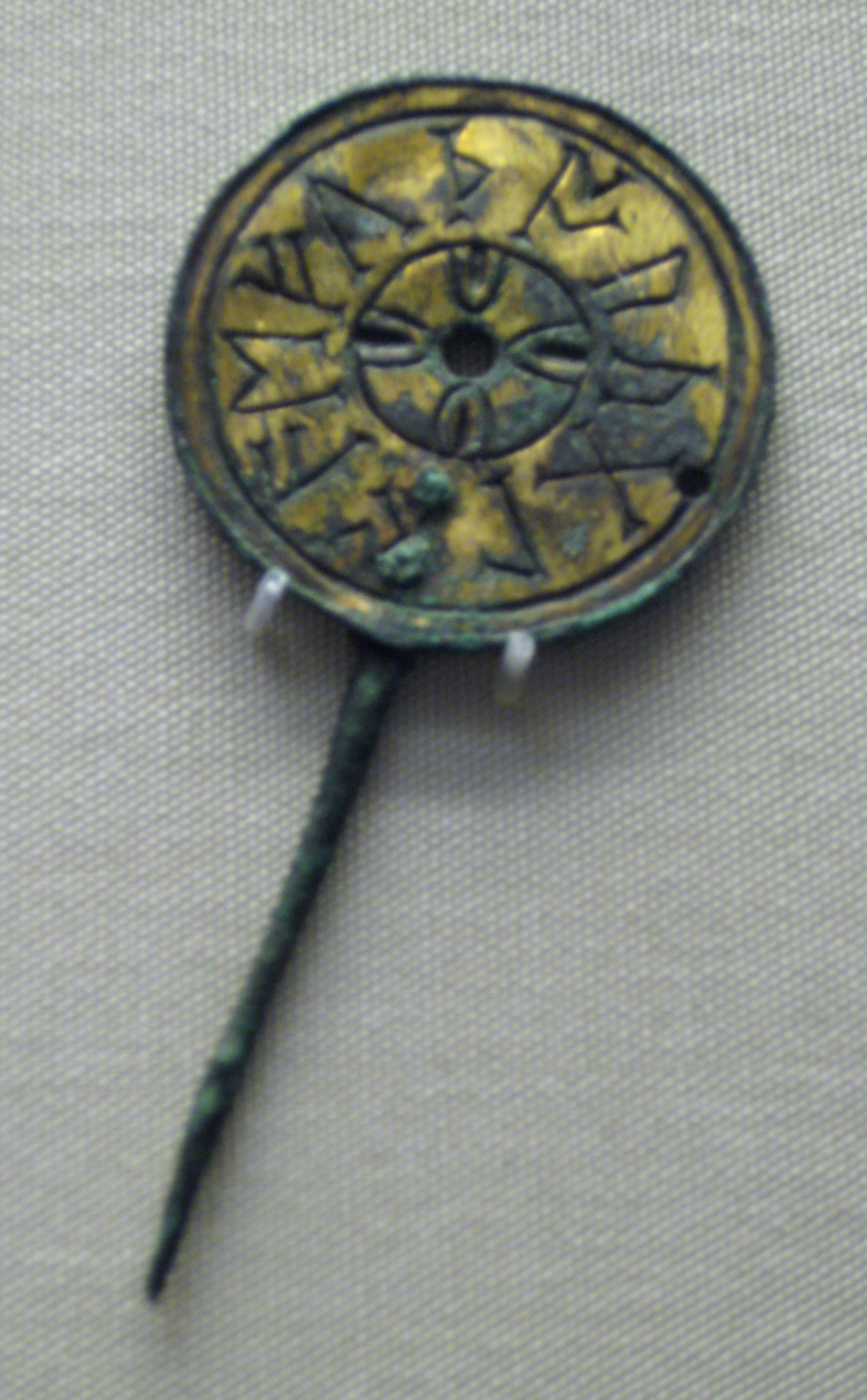
- The Malton Pin displays part of the Anglo-Saxon rune order: ᚠᚢᚦᚩᚱᚳᚷᛚᚪᚫᛖ ("f, u, þ, o, r, c, g, l, a, æ, and e")
- Script type: Alphabet
- Period: 5th through 11th centuries
- Direction: Left-to-right
- Languages: Anglo-Frisian (Old English and Pre–Old Frisian)

Related scripts
- Parent systems: Egyptian hieroglyphs: Proto-Sinaitic alphabet; Phoenician alphabet; Greek alphabet (Cumae variant); Old Italic alphabet?; Elder Futhark; Futhorc
- Sister systems: Younger Futhark

Anglo-Saxon runes or Anglo-Frisian runes are runes that were used by the Anglo-Saxons and Medieval Frisians (collectively called Anglo-Frisians) as an alphabet in their native writing system, recording both Old English and Pre–Old Frisian (Old English: ᚱᚢᚾᚪ, romanized: rūna, lit. 'rune'). Today, the characters are known collectively as the Futhorc (/ˈfuːθɔːrk/ FOO-thork) from the first six runes and their sound values (ᚠᚢᚦᚩᚱᚳ, fuþorc). The futhorc was a development from the older co-Germanic 24-character runic alphabet, known today as Elder Futhark, expanding to 28 characters in its older form and up to 34 characters in its younger form. In contemporary Scandinavia, the Elder Futhark developed into a shorter 16-character alphabet, today simply called Younger Futhark.

Use of the Anglo-Frisian runes is likely to have started in the 5th century onward and they continued to see use into the High Middle Ages. By the 8th century, they were eventually overtaken by the Old English Latin alphabet introduced to Anglo-Saxon England by missionaries at the end of the 6th century. Futhorc runes were no longer in common use by the 11th century, but MS Oxford St John's College 17 indicates that fairly accurate understanding of them persisted into at least the 12th century.

== History ==
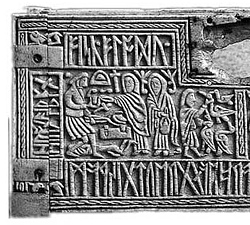
The left half of the front panel of the 8th century Franks Casket, depicting the Germanic legend of Weyland Smith and containing a riddle in Anglo-Saxon runes.

The Anglo-Frisian runic row was a 28-type further development of the 24-type Elder Futhark (type = number of runes), introducing more runes and reworking some existing runes to fit the period language. Starting from around the 5th century, it was used in Britain and Frisia as part of the diffuse Anglo-Frisian cultured sphere. Around the 8th century, runic writing disappears from Frisia, but use continues in Britain.

In the 9th century, the now Anglo-Saxon runic row, was further developed and more runes were introduced, eventually becoming a 33-type runic row with some further unstandardized examples of runes existing. In its late stage, it was largely analogous to the Latin script, and disappeared in its favour during the High Middle Ages.

Usage and commonality is unclear. From at least five centuries of use, fewer than 200 artifacts bearing futhorc inscriptions have survived.

=== Origin ===
The origin of the Anglo-Frisian runic row is unknown. One theory proposes that it was developed in Frisia and from there later spread to Britain. Another holds that runes were first introduced to Britain from the mainland where they were then modified and exported to Frisia. Both theories have their inherent weaknesses, and a definitive answer may come from further archaeological evidence.

=== Anglo-Frisian development ===
The early futhorc was nearly identical to the Elder Futhark, except for the split of ᚨ a into three variants ᚪ āc, ᚫ æsc and ᚩ ōs, resulting in 26 runes. This was done to account for the new phoneme produced by the Ingvaeonic split of allophones of long and short a. The earliest known instance of the ᚩ ōs rune may be from the 5th century, on the Undley bracteate. The earliest known instances of the ᚪ āc rune may be from the 6th century, appearing on objects such as the Schweindorf solidus. The double-barred ᚻ hægl characteristic of continental inscriptions is first attested as late as 698, on St Cuthbert's coffin; before that, the single-barred variant was used.

=== Anglo-Saxon development ===
In England, outside of the Brittonic West Country where evidence of Latin and even Ogham continued for several centuries, usage of the futhorc expanded. Runic writing in England became closely associated with the Latin scriptoria from the time of Anglo-Saxon Christianization in the 7th century. In some cases, texts would be written in the Latin alphabet, and þorn and ƿynn came to be used as extensions of the Latin alphabet. Additionally, in texts such as Beowulf and The Exeter Book, Anglo-Saxon runes were sometimes used as ideographic runes alongside the Latin alphabet to abbreviate words; for example, ᛗ was sometimes used to abbreviate "mann". By the time of the Norman Conquest of 1066 it was very rare, and it disappeared altogether a few centuries thereafter.

Several famous English examples mix runes and Roman script, or Old English and Latin, on the same object, including the Franks Casket and St Cuthbert's coffin; in the latter, three of the names of the Four Evangelists are given in Latin written in runes, but "LUKAS" (Saint Luke) is in Roman script. The coffin is also an example of an object created at the heart of the Anglo-Saxon church that uses runes. A leading expert, Raymond Ian Page, rejects the assumption often made in non-scholarly literature that runes were especially associated in post-conversion Anglo-Saxon England with Anglo-Saxon paganism or magic.

== Letters ==
The letter sequence and letter inventory of futhorc, along with the actual sounds indicated by those letters, could vary depending on location and time. That being so, an authentic and unified list of runes is not possible.

=== Rune inventory ===
Image	Unicode	Name	Name meaning	Transliteration	IPA
	ᚠ	feh (feoh)	wealth, cattle	f	/f/, [v] (word-medial allophone of /f/)
	ᚢ	ur (ūr)	aurochs	u	/u(:)/
	ᚦ	ðorn (þorn)	thorn	þ	/θ/, [ð] (word-medial allophone of /θ/)
	ᚩ	os (ōs)	The great god, Woden	o	/o(:)/
	ᚱ	rada (rād)	riding	r	/r/
	ᚳ	cen (ċēn)	torch	c	/k/, /kʲ/, /tʃ/
	ᚷ	geofu (ġyfu)	gift	g	/ɡ/, [ɣ] (word-medial allophone of /ɡ/), /j/
	ᚹ	wyn (wynn)	joy	w	/w/
	ᚻ / ᚺ	hægil (hæġl)	hail	h	/h/, [x], [ç]
	ᚾ	næd (nēod)	plight, lit. 'need'	n	/n/
	ᛁ	is (īs)	ice	i	/i(:)/
	ᛡ / ᛄ	gær (ġēar)	year	j	/j/
	ᛇ	ih (īw)	yew tree	ï	/i(:)/ [x], [ç]
	ᛈ	peord (peorþ)	(unknown)	p	/p/
	ᛉ	ilcs (eolh?)	(unknown, perhaps a derivative of elk)	x	(otiose as a sound but still used to transliterate the Latin letter 'X' into runes)
	ᛋ / ᚴ	sygil (siġel)	sun (sail in rune poem?)	s	/s/, [z] (word-medial allophone of /s/)
	ᛏ	ti (Tīw)	(unknown, originally god, Planet Mars in rune poem?)	t	/t/
	ᛒ	berc (beorc)	birch tree	b	/b/
	ᛖ	eh (eoh)	steed	e	/e(:)/
	ᛗ	mon (mann)	man	m	/m/
	ᛚ	lagu (lagu)	body of water (lake)	l	/l/
	ᛝ	ing (ing)	Ing (Ingui-Frea?)	ŋ	/ŋɡ/, /ŋ/
	ᛟ	oedil (œ̄þel)	inherited land, native country	œ	/ø(:)/
	ᛞ	dæg (dæġ)	day	d	/d/
	ᚪ	ac (āc)	oak tree	a	/ɑ(:)/
	ᚫ	æsc (æsċ)	ash tree	æ	/æ(:)/
	ᛠ	ear (ēar)	(unknown, perhaps earth)	ea	/æ(:)ɑ/
	ᚣ	yr (ȳr)	(unknown, perhaps bow or meaningless based on the name of the letter ur, compare other letters like cweorð ᛢ from peorð based on this pattern)	y	/y(:)/

The sequence of the runes above is based on Codex Vindobonensis 795. The first 24 of these runes directly continue the elder futhark letters, and do not deviate in sequence (though ᛞᛟ rather than ᛟᛞ is an attested sequence in both elder futhark and futhorc). The manuscripts Codex Sangallensis 878 and Cotton MS Domitian A IX have ᚣ precede ᛠ .

The names of the runes above are based on Codex Vindobonensis 795, besides the names ing and æsc which come from The Byrhtferth's Manuscript and replace the seemingly corrupted names lug and æs found in Codex Vindobonensis 795. Ti is sometimes named tir or tyr in other manuscripts. The words in parentheses in the name column are standardized spellings.

Image	UCS	Name	Name meaning	Transliteration	IPA
	ᛣ	calc	chalk? chalice? sandal?	k	/k/
	ᚸ	gar	spear	ḡ	/g/, [ɣ] (word-medial allophone of /g/)
	ᛢ	cweorð	(unknown)	q	/k/? (for writing Latin?)
	ᛥ	stan	stone	st	/st/
	N/A	(unknown)	(unknown)	ę, ᴇ	/ǝ/?
	𐌊?	(unknown)	(unknown)	į	/e(:)o/? /i(:)o/?
	ᛡ	īor	beaver? eel?	N/A	/i(:)o/?
	ᛤ	(unknown)	(unknown)	c̄, k̄	/k/

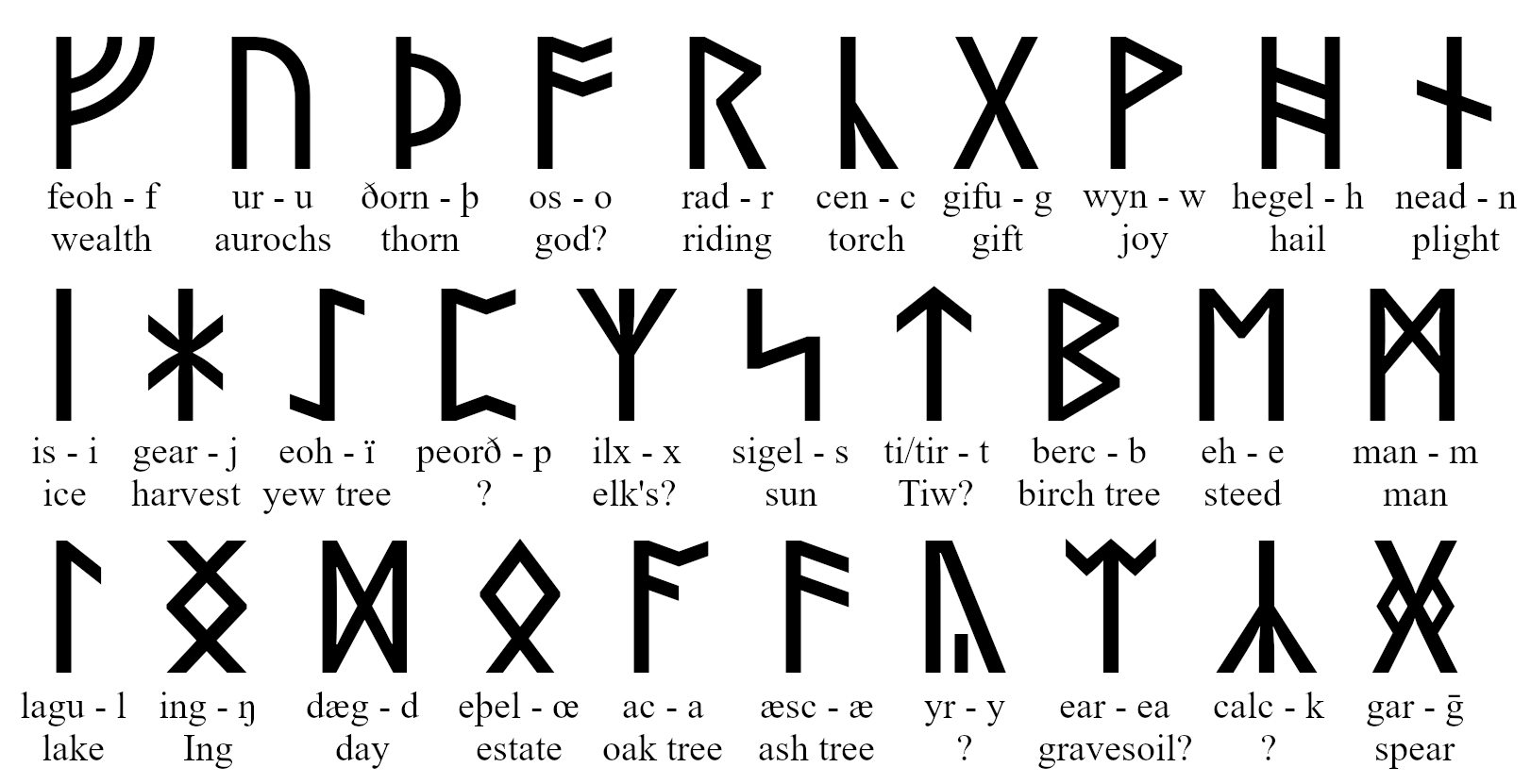
A chart showing 30 Anglo-Saxon runes

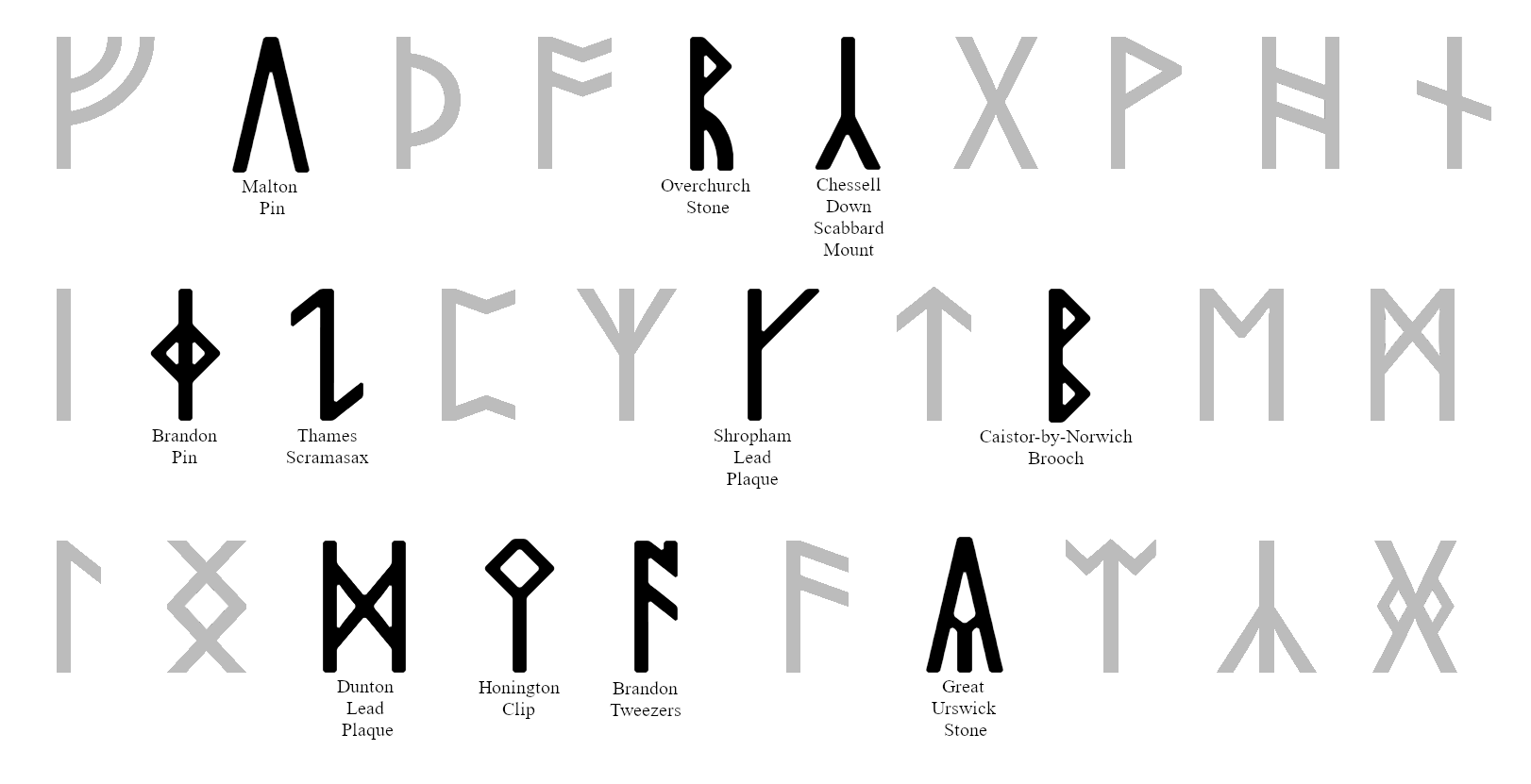
A rune-row showing variant shapes

The runes in the second table, above, were not included in Codex Vindobonensis 795: Calc appears in manuscripts, and epigraphically on the Ruthwell Cross, the Bramham Moor Ring, the Kingmoor Ring, and elsewhere. Gar appears in manuscripts, and epigraphically on the Ruthwell Cross and probably on the Bewcastle Cross. The unnamed ᛤ rune only appears on the Ruthwell Cross, where it seems to take calc's place as /k/ where that consonant is followed by a secondary fronted vowel. Cweorð and stan only appear in manuscripts. The unnamed ę rune only appears on the Baconsthorpe Grip. The unnamed į rune only appears on the Sedgeford Handle. While the rune poem and Cotton MS Domitian A IX present ᛡ as ior, and ᛄ as ger, epigraphically both are variants of ger (although ᛄ is only attested once outside of manuscripts (on the Brandon Pin). R.I. Page designated ior a pseudo-rune.

There is little doubt that calc and gar are modified forms of cen and gyfu, and that they were invented to address the ambiguity which arose from /k/ and /g/ spawning palatalized offshoots. R.I. Page designated cweorð and stan "pseudo-runes" because they appear pointless, and speculated that cweorð was invented merely to give futhorc an equivalent to 'Q'. The ę rune is likely a local innovation, possibly representing an unstressed vowel, and may derive its shape from ᛠ. The unnamed į rune is found in a personal name (bįrnferþ), where it stands for a vowel or diphthong. Anglo-Saxon expert Gaby Waxenberger speculates that į may not be a true rune, but rather a bindrune of ᛁ and ᚩ, or the result of a mistake.

=== Combinations and digraphs ===
Various runic combinations are found in the futhorc corpus. For example, the sequence ᚫᚪ appears on the Mortain Casket where ᛠ could theoretically have been used.

Combination	IPA	Word	Meaning	Found on
ᚩᛁ	/oi/?	]oin[.]	(unknown)	Lindisfarne Stone II
ᚷᚳ	~/dʒ/?	blagcmon	(personal name)	Maughold Stone I
ᚷᚷ	~/dʒ/	eggbrect	(personal name)	(an armband from the Galloway Hoard)
ᚻᚹ	/ʍ/	gehwelc	each	Honington Clip
ᚻᛋ	/ks/	wohs	to wax	Brandon Antler
ᚾᚷ	/ŋg/	hring	ring	Wheatley Hill Silver-Gilt Finger-Ring
ᛁᚷ	/ij/	modig	proud/bold/arrogant	Ruthwell Cross
ᛇᛋ	/ks/	BennaREïs	king Benna	(a coin of Beonna of East Anglia)
ᛋᚳ	/sk/, /ʃ/	fisc	fish	Franks Casket
ᛖᚩ	/eo/, /eːo/	eoh	(personal name)	Kirkheaton Stone
ᛖᚷ	/ej/	legdun	laid	Ruthwell Cross
ᛖᛇ	~/ej/, [eʝ]?	eateïnne	(personal name)	Thornhill Stone II
ᛖᚪ	/æɑ/, /æːɑ/	eadbald	(personal name)	Santi Marcellino e Pietro al Laterano Graffiti
ᚪᚢ	~/ɑu/	saule	soul	Thornhill Stone III
ᚪᛁ	/ɑi/	aib	(personal name)	Oostum Comb
ᚫᚢ	~/æu/	dæus	deus (Latin)	Whitby Comb
ᚫᚪ	/æɑ/, /æːɑ/	æadan	(personal name)	Mortain Casket

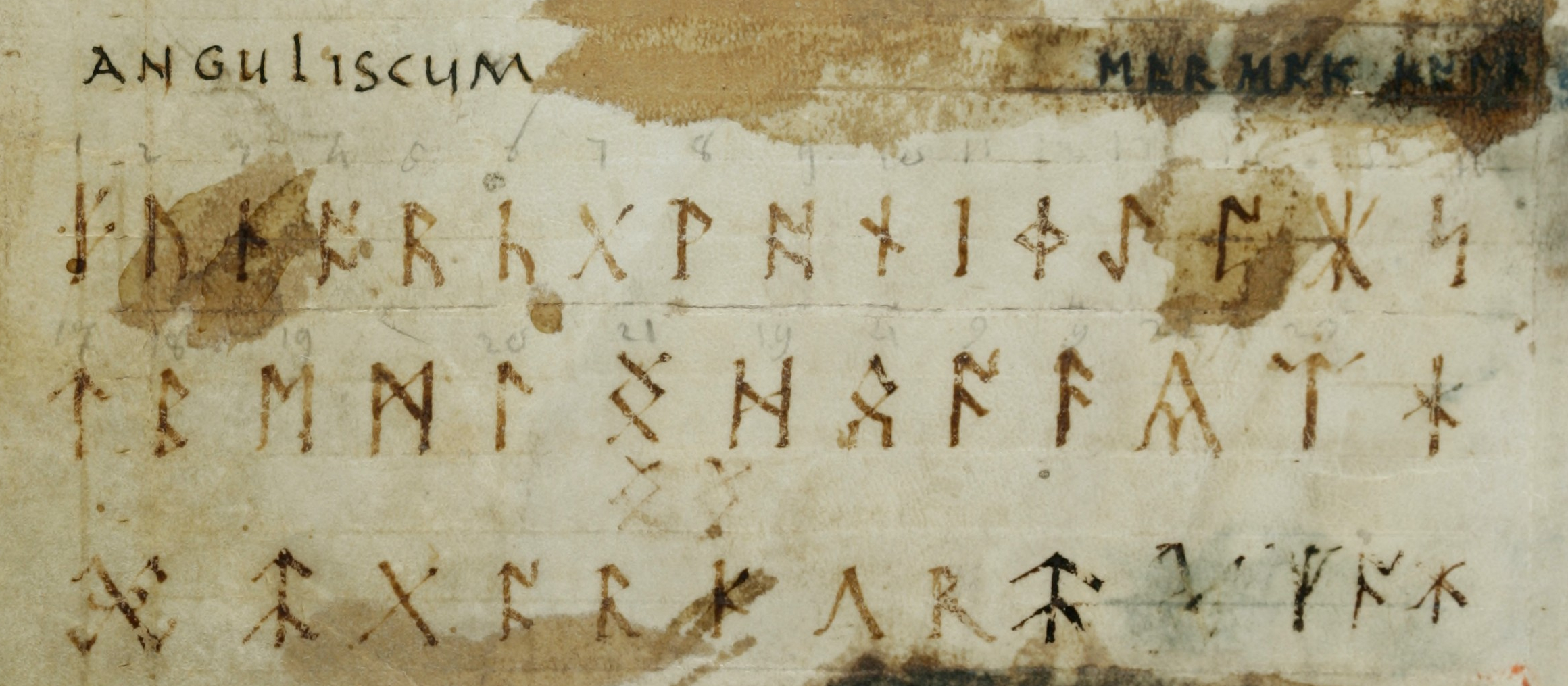
The Anglo-Saxon futhorc (abecedarium anguliscum) as presented in Codex Sangallensis 878 (9th century)

== Usage and culture ==
A rune in Old English could be called a rūnstæf (lit. 'runestaff'), or simply rūn.

Futhorc inscriptions hold diverse styles and contents. Ochre has been detected on at least one English runestone, implying its runes were once painted. Bind runes are common in futhorc (relative to its small corpus), and were seemingly used most often to ensure the runes would fit in a limited space. Futhorc logography is attested to in a few manuscripts. This was done by having a rune stand for its name, or a similar sounding word. In the sole extant manuscript of the poem Beowulf, the ēðel rune was used as a logogram for the word ēðel (meaning "homeland", or "estate"). Both the Hackness Stone and Codex Vindobonensis 795 attest to futhorc Cipher runes. In one manuscript (Corpus Christi College, MS 041) a writer seems to have used futhorc runes like Roman numerals, writing ᛉᛁᛁ⁊ᛉᛉᛉᛋᚹᛁᚦᚩᚱ, which likely means "12&30 more".

There is some evidence of futhorc rune magic. The possibly magical alu sequence seems to appear on an urn found at Spong Hill in spiegelrunes (runes whose shapes are mirrored). In a tale from Bede's Ecclesiastical History (written in Latin), a man named Imma cannot be bound by his captors and is asked if he is using "litteras solutorias" ('loosening letters') to break his binds. In one Old English translation of the passage, Imma is asked if he is using "drycraft" (magic, druidcraft) or "runestaves" to break his binds. Furthermore, futhorc rings have been found with what appear to be enchanted inscriptions for the stanching of blood.

== Inscription corpus ==
Futhorc series on the Seax of Beagnoth (9th century). The series has 28 runes, omitting io. The shapes of j, s, d, œ and y deviate from the standard forms shown above; eo appears mirrored.

The Old English and Old Frisian Runic Inscriptions database project at the Catholic University of Eichstätt-Ingolstadt, Germany, aims at collecting the genuine corpus of Old English inscriptions containing more than two runes in its paper edition, while the electronic edition aims at including both genuine and doubtful inscriptions down to single-rune inscriptions.

The corpus of the paper edition encompasses about one hundred objects (including stone slabs, stone crosses, bones, rings, brooches, weapons, urns, a writing tablet, tweezers, a sun-dial, comb, bracteates, caskets, a font, dishes, and graffiti). The database includes, in addition, 16 inscriptions containing a single rune, several runic coins, and 8 cases of dubious runic characters (runelike signs, possible Latin characters, weathered characters). Comprising fewer than 200 inscriptions, the corpus is slightly larger than that of Continental Elder Futhark (about 80 inscriptions, c. 400–700), but slightly smaller than that of the Scandinavian Elder Futhark (about 260 inscriptions, c. 200–800).

Runic finds in England cluster along the east coast with a few finds scattered further inland in Southern England. Frisian finds cluster in West Frisia. Looijenga (1997) lists 23 English (including two 7th-century Christian inscriptions) and 21 Frisian inscriptions predating the 9th century.

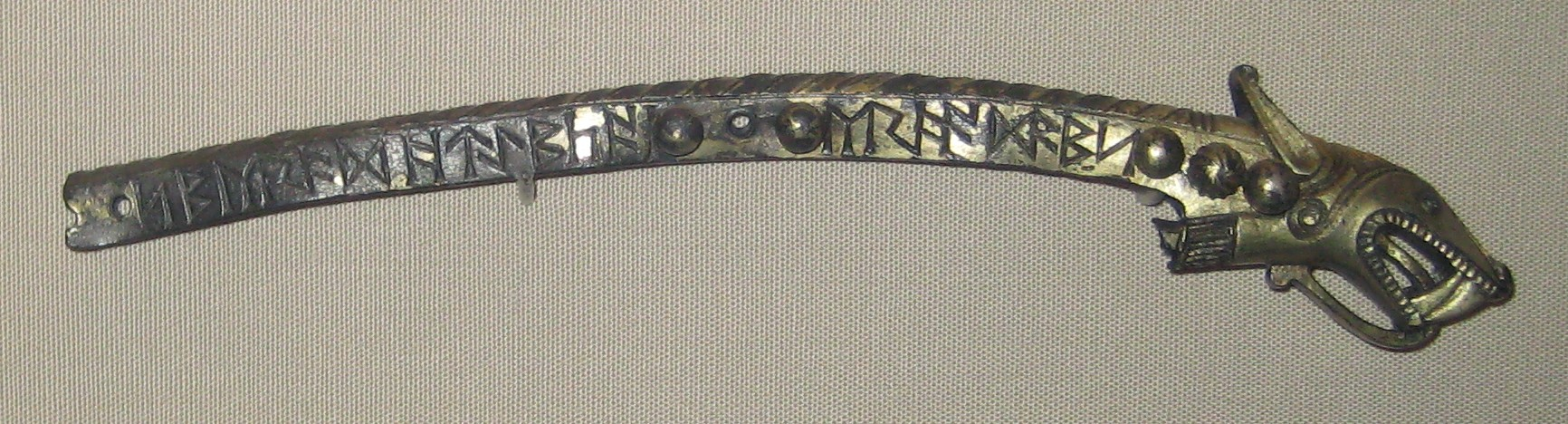
The Thames zoomorphic silver-gilt (knife?) mount (late 8th century)

=== Frisian ===
Currently known inscriptions in Anglo-Frisian runes from Frisia include:

- Ferwerd combcase, 6th century; me uræ
- Amay comb, c. 600; eda
- Oostyn comb, 8th century; aib ka[m]bu / deda habuku (with a triple-barred h)
- Toornwerd comb, 8th century; kabu
- Skanomodu solidus, 575–610; skanomodu
- Harlingen solidus, 575–625, hada (two ac runes, double-barred h)
- Schweindorf solidus, 575–625, wela[n]du "Weyland" (or þeladu; running right to left)
- Folkestone tremissis, c. 650; æniwulufu
- Midlum sceat, c. 750; æpa
- Rasquert swordhandle (whalebone handle of a symbolic sword), late 8th century; ek [u]mædit oka, "I, Oka, not made mad" (compare ek unwodz from the Danish corpus)
- Arum sword, a yew-wood miniature sword, late 8th century; edæboda
- Westeremden A, a yew weaving-slay; adujislume[þ]jisuhidu
- Westeremden B, a yew-stick, 8th century; oph?nmuji?adaamluþ / :wimœ?ahþu?? / iwio?u?du?ale
- Britsum yew-stick; þkniaberetdud / ]n:bsrsdnu; the k has Younger Futhark shape and probably represents a vowel.
- Hantum whalebone plate; [.]:aha:k[; the reverse side is inscribed with Roman ABA.
- Bernsterburen whalebone staff, c. 800; tuda æwudu kius þu tuda
- Hamwic horse knucklebone, dated to between 650 and 1025; katæ (categorised as Frisian on linguistic grounds, from *kautōn "knucklebone")
- Wijnaldum B gold pendant, c. 600; hiwi
- Kantens combcase, early 5th century; li
- Hoogebeintum comb, c. 700; [...]nlu / ded
- Wijnaldum A antler piece; zwfuwizw[...]

=== English ===
Currently known inscriptions in Anglo-Frisian runes from England include:

- Ash Gilton (Kent) gilt silver sword pommel, 6th century; [...]emsigimer[...]
- Chessel Down I (Isle of Wight), 6th century; [...]bwseeekkkaaa
- Chessel Down II (Isle of Wight) silver plate (attached to the scabbard mouthpiece of a ring-sword), early 6th century; æko:[.]ori
- Boarley (Kent) copper disc-brooch, c. 600; ærsil
- Harford (Norfolk) brooch, c. 650; luda:gibœtæsigilæ "Luda repaired the brooch"
- West Heslerton (North Yorkshire) copper cruciform brooch, early 6th century; neim
- Loveden Hill (Lincolnshire) urn; 5th to 6th century; reading uncertain, maybe sïþæbæd þiuw hlaw "the grave of Siþæbæd the maid"
- Spong Hill (Norfolk), three cremation urns, 5th century; decorated with identical runic stamps, reading alu (in Spiegelrunen).
- Kent II coins (some 30 items), 7th century; reading pada
- Kent III, IV silver sceattas, c. 600; reading æpa and epa
- Suffolk gold shillings (three items), c. 660; stamped with desaiona
- Caistor-by-Norwich astragalus, 5th century; possibly a Scandinavian import, in Elder Futhark transliteration reading raïhan "roe"
- Watchfield (Oxfordshire) copper fittings, 6th century; Elder Futhark reading hariboki:wusa (with a probably already fronted to æ)
- Wakerley (Northamptonshire) copper brooch, 6th century; buhui
- Dover (Kent) brooch, c. 600; þd bli / bkk
- Upper Thames Valley gold coins (four items), 620s; benu:tigoii; benu:+:tidi
- Willoughby-on-the-Wolds (Nottinghamshire) copper bowl, c. 600; a
- Cleatham (Lincolnshire) copper bowl, c. 600; [...]edih
- Sandwich/Richborough (Kent) stone, 650 or earlier; [...]ahabu[...]i, perhaps *ræhæbul "stag"
- Whitby I (Yorkshire) jet spindle whorl; ueu
- Selsey (West Sussex) gold plates, 6th to 8th centuries; brnrn / anmu
- St. Cuthbert's coffin (Durham), dated to 698
- Whitby II (Yorkshire) bone comb, 7th century; [dæ]us mæus godaluwalu dohelipæ cy[ i.e. deus meus, god aluwaldo, helpæ Cy... "my god, almighty god, help Cy..." (Cynewulf or a similar personal name; compare also names of God in Old English poetry.)
- the Franks casket; 8th century
- zoomorphic silver-gilt knife mount, discovered in the River Thames near Westminster Bridge (late 8th century)
- the Ruthwell Cross; 8th century, the inscription may be partly a modern reconstruction
- the Brandon antler piece, wohs wildum deoræ an "[this] grew on a wild animal"; 9th century.
- Kingmoor Ring
- the Seax of Beagnoth; 9th century (also known as the Thames scramasax); the only complete alphabet
- Near Fakenham plaque; 8th-11th century lead plaque interpreted as bearing a healing inscription

=== Related manuscript texts ===
- Codex Sangallensis 270 — lists runes with their names, and explains how to use certain rune ciphers
- Codex Sangallensis 878 — contains a presentation of Anglo-Saxon runes
- Codex Vindobonensis 795 — contains a description of Anglo-Saxon runes
- Cotton Domitian A.IX — lists runes with their names
- Cotton Otho B.x.165 — contained the Old English rune poem before being destroyed in a fire
- Cotton Vitellius A.XII — lists runes in alphabetical order
- MS Oxford St. John's College 17 — contains a "table of runic, cryptographic, and exotic alphabets".

== See also ==
- Elder Futhark
- List of runestones
- Ogham
- Old English Latin alphabet
- Runic alphabet
- Younger Futhark
