= Södermanland Runic Inscription 47 =

Coordinates: 58.84408°N 16.75092°E

The Södermanland Runic Inscription 47 is a Viking Age runestone engraved in Old Norse with the Younger Futhark runic alphabet. It is located in Vålsta in Nyköping Municipality. The inscription consists of both long branch runes and cipher runes ("branch" and "ice" types).

== Inscription ==
...(ʀ)-kʀ : kiarþi : kuml : þat:si : eftiʀ : osmunt : sun : sin + han : is : krafin : o · ku... <rauʀ> : <uart/fart> : at : ryʀ:iks : sun
[Hrø]ʀ[i]kʀ {} giærði {} kumbl {} þatsi {} æftiʀ {} Asmund, {} sun {} sinn. {} Hann {} es {} grafinn {} a {} Gu[tlandi]/ku[mbli] rauʀ {} <uart>/<fart> {} at {} Hrøʀiks {} sun.
"Hrœríkr made this monument in memory of Ásmundr, his son. He is buried in Gotland/ the monument(?) ... cairn(?) in memory of Hrœríkr's son. "
