= Gothic (Unicode block) =

- Range: U+10330..U+1034F (32 code points)
- Plane: SMP
- Scripts: Gothic
- Major alphabets: Gothic
- Assigned: 27 code points
- Unused: 5 reserved code points

Unicode version history
- 3.1 (2001): 27 (+27)

Unicode documentation
- Code chart ∣ Web page

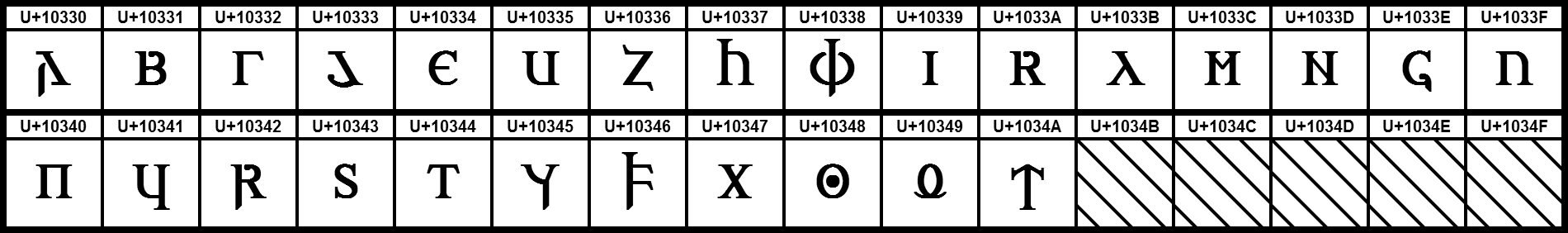
Graphical representation of the Gothic Unicode block.

Gothic is a Unicode block containing characters for writing the East Germanic Gothic language.

Gothic^{[1]}^{[2]} Official Unicode Consortium code chart (PDF)
	0	1	2	3	4	5	6	7	8	9	A	B	C	D	E	F
U+1033x	𐌰	𐌱	𐌲	𐌳	𐌴	𐌵	𐌶	𐌷	𐌸	𐌹	𐌺	𐌻	𐌼	𐌽	𐌾	𐌿
U+1034x	𐍀	𐍁	𐍂	𐍃	𐍄	𐍅	𐍆	𐍇	𐍈	𐍉	𐍊					
Notes: 1. As of Unicode version 17.0; 2. Grey areas indicate non-assigned code points

== History ==
The following Unicode-related documents record the purpose and process of defining specific characters in the Gothic block:

Version	Final code points (Note: Proposed code points and characters names may differ from final code points and names)	Count	L2 ID	WG2 ID	Document
3.1	U+10330..1034A	27	L2/97-102		Jenkins, John H. (1997-05-21), Proposal to add Gothic to ISO/IEC 10646
3.1	U+10330..1034A	27	L2/97-196	N1581	Jenkins, John; Everson, Michael (1997-05-27), Gothic proposal
3.1	U+10330..1034A	27	L2/97-288	N1603	Umamaheswaran, V. S. (1997-10-24), "8.24.1", Unconfirmed Meeting Minutes, WG 2 Meeting # 33, Heraklion, Crete, Greece, 20 June – 4 July 1997
3.1	U+10330..1034A	27	L2/97-255R		Aliprand, Joan (1997-12-03), "Gothic", Approved Minutes – UTC #73 & L2 #170 joint meeting, Palo Alto, CA – August 4-5, 1997
3.1	U+10330..1034A	27	L2/98-286	N1703	Umamaheswaran, V. S.; Ksar, Mike (1998-07-02), "8.20.2", Unconfirmed Meeting Minutes, WG 2 Meeting #34, Redmond, WA, USA; 1998-03-16--20
3.1	U+10330..1034A	27	L2/00-353		Everson, Michael (2000-10-12), Gothic 10330--1034F (draft block description)
3.1	U+10330..1034A	27	L2/00-358		Everson, Michael (2000-10-13), Gothic 10330--1034F (draft block description)
3.1	U+10330..1034A	27	L2/05-068		Scherer, Markus (2005-02-08), Missing numeric value for Gothic Letter Nine Hundred
3.1	U+10330..1034A	27	L2/05-026		Moore, Lisa (2005-05-16), "Properties - Gothic Letter Nine Hundred (B.14.5)", UTC #102 Minutes
3.1	U+10330..1034A	27	L2/06-031		McGowan, Rick (2006-02-01), "properties of U+10341 GOTHIC LETTER NINETY", Comments on Public Review Issues (October 29, 2005 - January 30, 2006)
3.1	U+10330..1034A	27	L2/06-008R2		Moore, Lisa (2006-02-13), "Consensus 106-C26", UTC #106 Minutes, "Align the properties of U+10341 GOTHIC LETTER NINETY with U+1034A GOTHIC LETTER NINE HUNDRED -- change the general category of U+10341 from Lo to Nl"
