= *Laguz =

Rune

Name	Proto-Germanic	Old English	Old Norse
Name	*Laguz/*Laukaz	Lagu	Lögr
Name	"lake"/"leek"	"ocean, sea"	"water, waterfall"
Shape	Elder Futhark	Futhorc	Younger Futhark
Unicode	ᛚ U+16DA		
Transliteration	l		
Transcription	l		
IPA	[l]		
Position in rune-row	21		15

*Laguz ('water', 'lake'), or *Laukaz ('leek'), is the reconstructed Proto-Germanic name of the l-rune ᛚ. In the Anglo-Saxon rune poem, it is called lagu "ocean". In the Younger Futhark, the rune is called lögr "waterfall" in Icelandic and logr "water" in Norse.

The name of the corresponding Gothic letter (𐌻, l) is attested as laaz in the Codex Vindobonensis 795; a normalized (Ulfilan) Gothic form *lagus is thought to underlie this unconventional spelling.

The rune is identical in shape to the letter l in the Raetic alphabet.

== Rune poem ==
Rune Poem:	English Translation:
Old Norwegian ᛚ Lögr er, fællr ór fjalle foss; en gull ero nosser.	A waterfall is a River which falls from a mountain-side; but ornaments are of gold.
Old Icelandic ᛚ Lögr er vellanda vatn ok viðr ketill ok glömmungr grund. lacus lofðungr.	Water is eddying stream and broad geysir and land of the fish.
Old English ᛚ Lagu bẏþ leodum langsum geþuht, gif hi sculun neþan on nacan tealtum and hi sæẏþa sƿẏþe bregaþ and se brimhengest bridles ne gẏm[eð].	The ocean seems interminable to men, if they venture on the rolling bark and the waves of the sea terrify them and the stallion of the deep heed not its bridle.

== Leek hypothesis ==
The hypothesis that the Proto-Germanic name for the rune is *laukaz ('leek') is based not on the rune poems, but rather on early inscriptions, such as the Bülach fibula, where the rune has been hypothesised to be an abbreviation of *laukaz. The choice of word may be due to the plant being seen as a symbol of fertility and healing. Also supporting this idea are 10th century manuscripts that use the Old Norse descendent laukr as a name for the rune, alongside lín ('flax', 'linen').

== See also ==
- Elder Futhark
- Rune poem
