= Anglo-Saxon runic rings =

Rings inscribed with futhorc runes, 9th or 10th century

Drawing of the Bramham Moor Ring inscription as published in 1736 in Drake's Eboracum

Seven known rings from the Anglo-Saxon period (9th or 10th century) bear futhorc inscriptions. Futhorc are Anglo-Saxon runes used to write Old English.

The most notable of the rings are the Bramham Moor Ring, found in the 18th century, and the Kingmoor Ring, found 1817, inscribed with a nearly identical magical runic formula read as

ærkriufltkriuriþonglæstæpontol

A third ring, found before 1824 (perhaps identical to a ring found in 1773 at Linstock castle in Carlisle), has a magical inscription of a similar type,

ery.ri.uf.dol.yri.þol.ƿles.te.pote.nol.

This magical formula appears partially derived from the Irish language.

The remaining five rings have much shorter inscriptions.

- Wheatley Hill, County Durham, found in 1993, now in the British Museum. Late 8th century. Inscription: "[h]ring ic hatt[æ]" (I am called ring).
- Coquet Island, Northumberland, found before 1866, now lost. Inscription: "+ þis is -" (this is...).
- Cramond, Edinburgh, found 1869–70, now in the National Museum of Scotland. 9th-10th century. Inscription: "[.]eƿor[.]el[.]u."
- Thames Exchange, London, found 1989, now in the Museum of London. Inscription: "[.]fuþni ine."

== Bramham Moor Ring ==
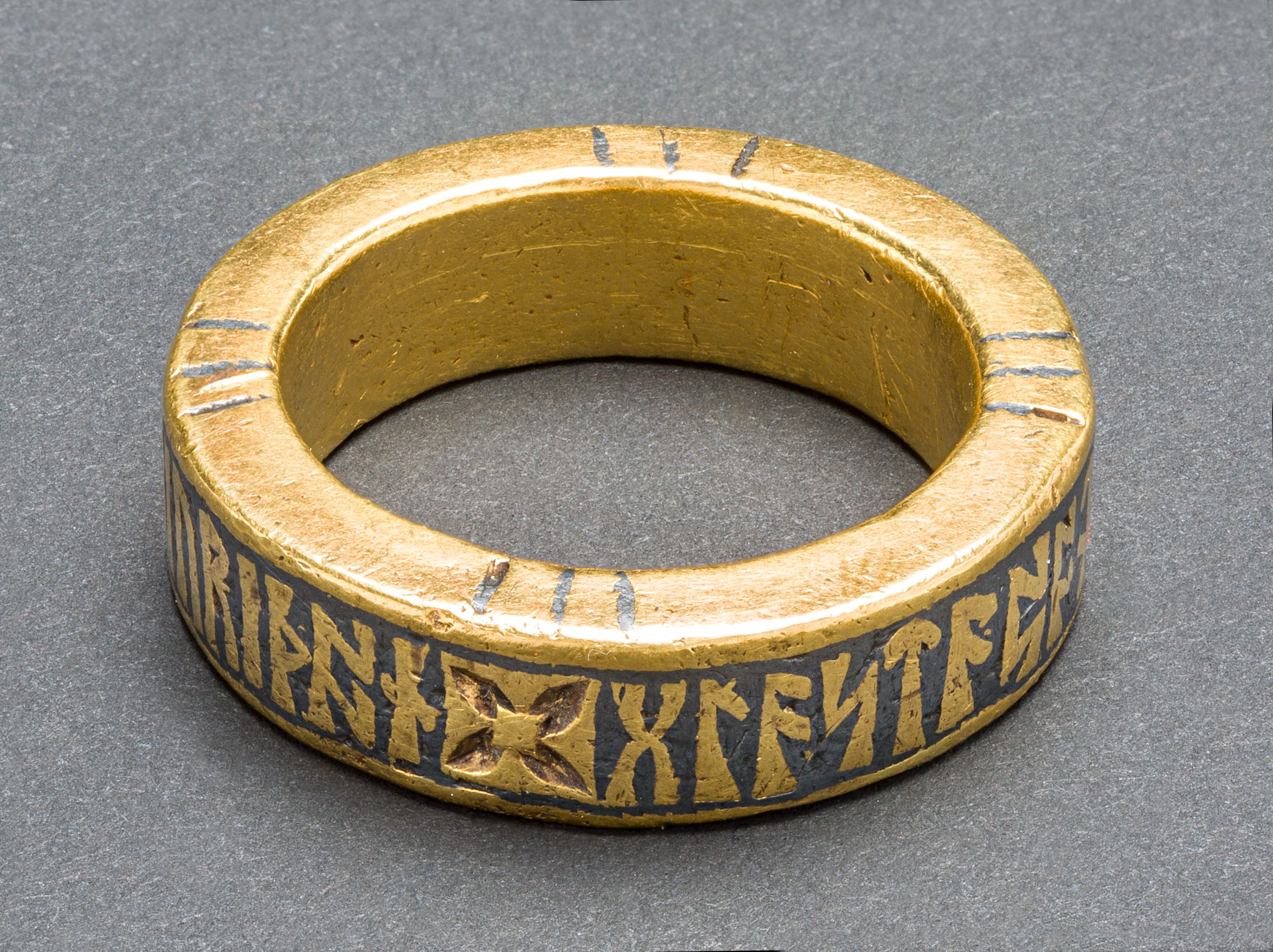
The Bramham Moor ring

The Bramham Moor Ring, dated to the ninth century, was found in Bramham cum Oglethorpe, West Yorkshire in or before 1732 (now in the Danish National Museum, no. 8545). It is made from electrum (gold with niello), with a diameter of c. 29 mm. and weighs 40.22 g.

The inscription reads:

᛭ ᚫᚱᛦᚱᛁᚢᚠᛚᛏ ᛭ ᛦᚱᛁᚢᚱᛁᚦᚩᚾ ᛭ ᚷᛚᚫᛋᛏᚫᛈᚩᚾ͡ᛏᚩᚿ
{} ærkriuflt {} kriuriþon {} glæstæpon͡tol

Where k is the late futhorc calc rune of the same shape as Younger Futhark Yr and the n͡t is written as a bindrune.

== Kingmoor Ring ==
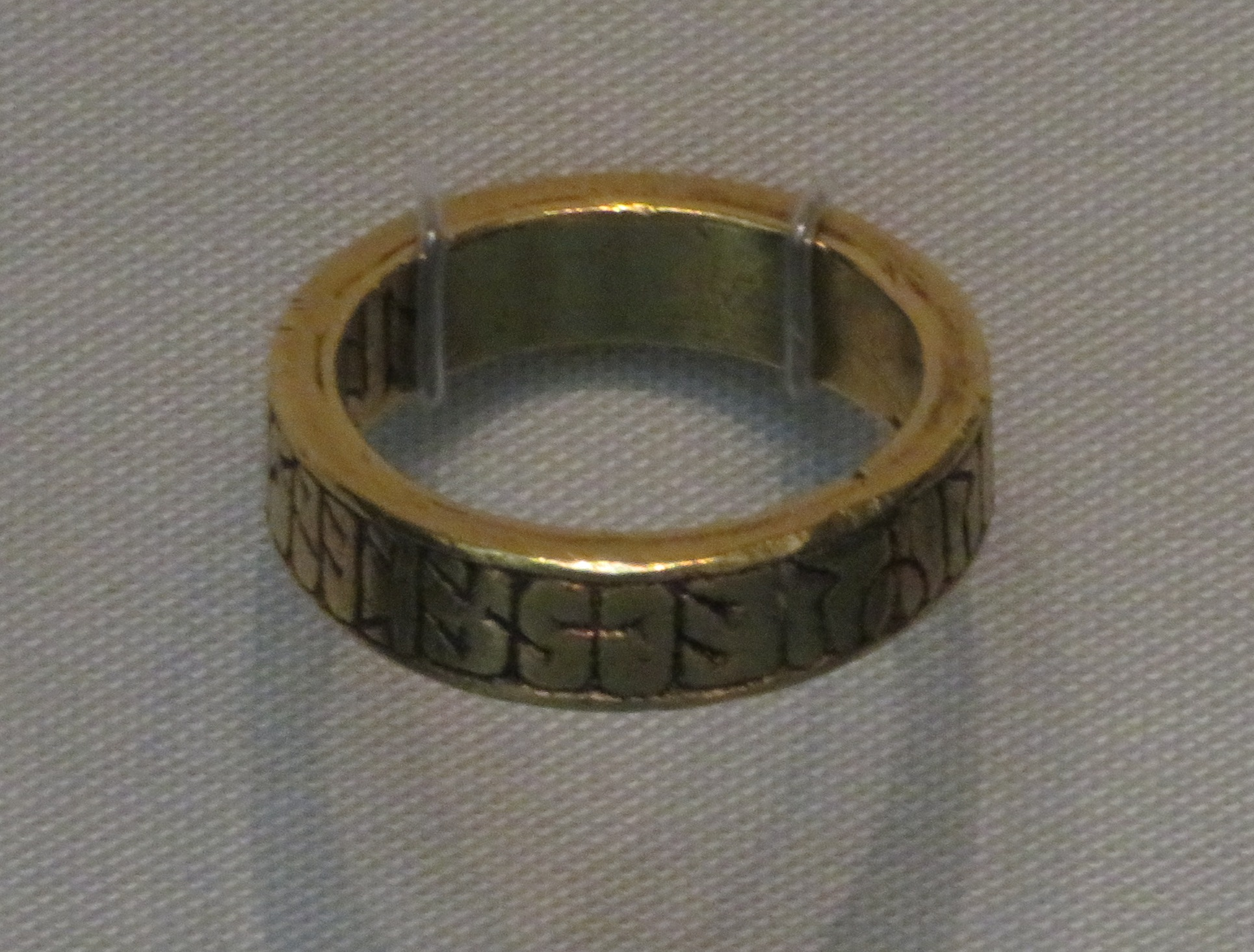
Kingmoor gold runic ring

The Kingmoor Ring (also Greymoor Hill Ring) dates to the 9th or 10th century. It is gold, with a diameter of ca. 27 mm.

It was discovered in June 1817 at Greymoor Hill, Kingmoor, near Carlisle (54°55′0″N 2°58′30″W). By 1859, the ring was possessed by the British Museum (ring catalogue no. 184), who had received it from the Earl of Aberdeen. A replica is exhibited in the Tullie House Museum and Art Gallery in Carlisle.

The inscription reads:

᛭ ᚨᚱᛦᚱᛁᚢᚠᛚᛏᛦᚱᛁᚢᚱᛁᚦᚩᚾᚷᛚᚨᚴᛏᚨᛈᚩᚾ / ᛏᚨᚿ
{} ærkriufltkriuriþonglæstæpon / tol

The final ᛏᚨᚿ tol is written on the inside of the ring. The inscription amounts to a total of 30 signs.

Where k is the late Futhorc calc rune of the same shape as Younger Futhark Yr, and the s is the so-called "bookhand s" looking similar to a Younger Futhark k, ᚴ.

== Linstock Castle Ring ==
A ring made of agate, perhaps dating to the 9th century, was found before 1824. It is now British Museum ring catalogue no. 186.

The inscription reads:

ᛖᚱᚣ ᛫ ᚱᛁ ᛫ ᚢᚠ ᛫ ᛞᚩᛚ ᛫ ᚣᚱᛁ ᛫ ᚦᚩᛚ ᛫ ?ᛚᛖᛋ ᛫ ᛏᛖ ᛫ ᛈᚩᛏᛖ ᛫ ᚾᚩᛚ?? ᛫
ery . ri . uf . dol . yri . þol . ?les . te . pote . nol .

Page (1999) considers this a corrupt version of the inscription on the Kingmoor and Bramham Moor rings.

Although the location of this ring is unrecorded, Page (1999) suggests that it is identical to a ring found at Linstock Castle in 1773. A note found among Thorkelin's archive documenting his travels to England between 1785 and 1791. The paper records an obscure inscription, "ERY.RI.VF.MOL / YRI.VRI.NOL / GLES.TE.SOTE.THOL", identified as "found in 1773 at Lynstock Castle near Carlisle, & not far from the Picts Wall in Cumberland". Page adduces a note from a sale catalogue of 1778 which lists "An ancient Runic ring, found near the Picts Well, 1773".

The ring bears a unique variant of ȳr, which more closely resembles that rune's appearance in manuscripts than the rune's other epigraphical attestations.

== Wheatley Hill Finger-Ring ==
A gilded silver ring, dating to the 8th century, found in 1993 in Wheatley Hill, County Durham and now in the British Museum.

The inscription reads:

[ᚻ]ᚱᛁᚾᚷᛁᚳᚻᚪᛏᛏ[ᚫ]
[h]ringichatt[æ]
Hring iċ hāttæ
I am called ring

Two of the three gem bosses were later applied to the ring cover for the first and last runes.

Whilst runic inscriptions often refer to the object on which they are written, usually, this is "me" or another suitable pronoun. The Wheatley Hill Finger-Ring is unique amongst runic inscribed objects as identifying what type of object it is - a "ring".

== Interpretation of the ærkriu charm ==
The sequence ærkriu found on both the Kingmoor and Bramham Moor Rings is interpreted as a spell for staunching blood, based on comparison with a charm containing the sequence ærcrio found in Bald's Leechbook (i.vii, fol. 20v). For this reason, the entire inscription is likely a protective or healing charm or spell with the ring serving as an amulet.

The charm in Leechbook is also found in Bodley MS:

Leechbook i.vii

æȝryn. thon. struth. fola
arȝrenn. tart. struth. on. tria
enn. piath. hathu. morfana. on hæl
+ara. carn. leou. ȝroth. ƿeorn .lll.
ffil. crondi. ƿ. |X|. mro cron.
ærcrio. ermio. aeR. leNO.

Bodley MS

ær grim struht fola.
ær grenn tart strut onntria
enn piathu Morfona onnhel.
ara carn leoƿ gruth ueron .lll.
fil cron diƿ .X. inro cron
aer crio ær mio aær leno.

The Leech book instructs, " To stop blood, poke into the ear with a whole ear of barley, in such a way that he [the patient] be unaware of it." Some write this, followed by "either for horse or men, a blood-stauncher."

While the charm is "magical gibberish", there are some elements that can be identified as Irish: struth fola corresponds to Old Irish sruth fola "stream of blood". Arȝrenn, ær grim, etc. may be for ar greann "for irritation". Other parts sound clearly Anglo-Saxon such as onnhel, on hæl for unhæl "unhealthy". The .lll. has been taken as a misreading of the Ogham letter ᚃ (fern, lit. 'alder'), the ffil. crondi. ƿ. following it as the gloss fil crand .i. ƿ[eorn] "it is a tree, i.e. 'alder'" In the interpretation of Meroney (1945), the original text gave a list of ingredients for staunching blood, alder (ƿeorn), curds (ȝroth), etc., with a gloss explaining one of them having slipped into the text. Cron aer crio is taken as deriving from cron ar crú, Irish for "prohibition against bleeding", ær leno as "against afflictions" (Old Irish ar léunu).

== Fake rings ==
Some fake rings, dating from the 18th century, exist. They are generally bronze, do not have niello letters but rather some kind of lacquer, and show signs of machining.

== See also ==
- List of runestones
- Magic ring
- Runic magic
