= Ear (rune) =

Rune of the Anglo-Saxon futhorc

Name	Old English
Name	Éar
Shape	Futhorc
Unicode	ᛠ U+16E0
Transliteration	ea
Transcription	ea, æa
IPA	[æ(ː)ɑ]
Position in rune-row	28 or 29

The Ear ᛠ rune of the Anglo-Saxon futhorc is a late addition to the alphabet. It is, however, still attested from epigraphical evidence, notably the Thames scramasax, and its introduction thus cannot postdate the 9th century.

== Transliteration ==
It is transliterated as ea, and the Anglo-Saxon rune poem glosses it as

ᛠ [ear] bẏþ egle eorla gehƿẏlcun, / ðonn[e] fæstlice flæsc onginneþ, / hraƿ colian, hrusan ceosan / blac to gebeddan; bleda gedreosaþ, / ƿẏnna geƿitaþ, ƿera gesƿicaþ.
" ᛠ [ear] is horrible to every knight, / when the corpse quickly begins to cool / and is laid in the bosom of the dark earth. / Prosperity declines, happiness passes away / and covenants are broken."

== Jacob Grimm's interpretation ==
Jacob Grimm in his 1835 Teutonic Mythology (ch. 9) attached a deeper significance to the name. He interprets the Old English poem as describing "death personified", connected to the death-bringing god of war, Ares. He notes that the ear rune is simply a Tyr rune with two barbs attached to it and suggests that Tir and Ear, Old High German Zio and Eor, were two names of the same god. He finds the name in the toponym of Eresburg (*Eresberc) in Westphalia, in Latin Mons martis. Grimm thus suggests that the Germans had adopted the name of Greek Ares as an epithet of their god of war, and Eresberc was literally an Areopagus. Grimm further notes that in the Bavarian (Marcomannic) area, Tuesday (dies Martis) was known as Ertag, Iertag, Irtag, Eritag, Erchtag, Erichtag as opposed to the Swabian and Swiss (Alemannic) region where the same day is Ziestag as in Anglo-Saxon. Grimm concludes that Ziu was known by the alternative name Eor, derived from Greek Ares, and also as Saxnot among the Saxons, identified as a god of the sword.

== In popular culture ==
In the farm life simulation game Stardew Valley, it represents a symbol of faith called Yoba.

== See also ==
- Ior
