= Cipher runes =

Cryptographical replacement of the letters of the runic alphabet

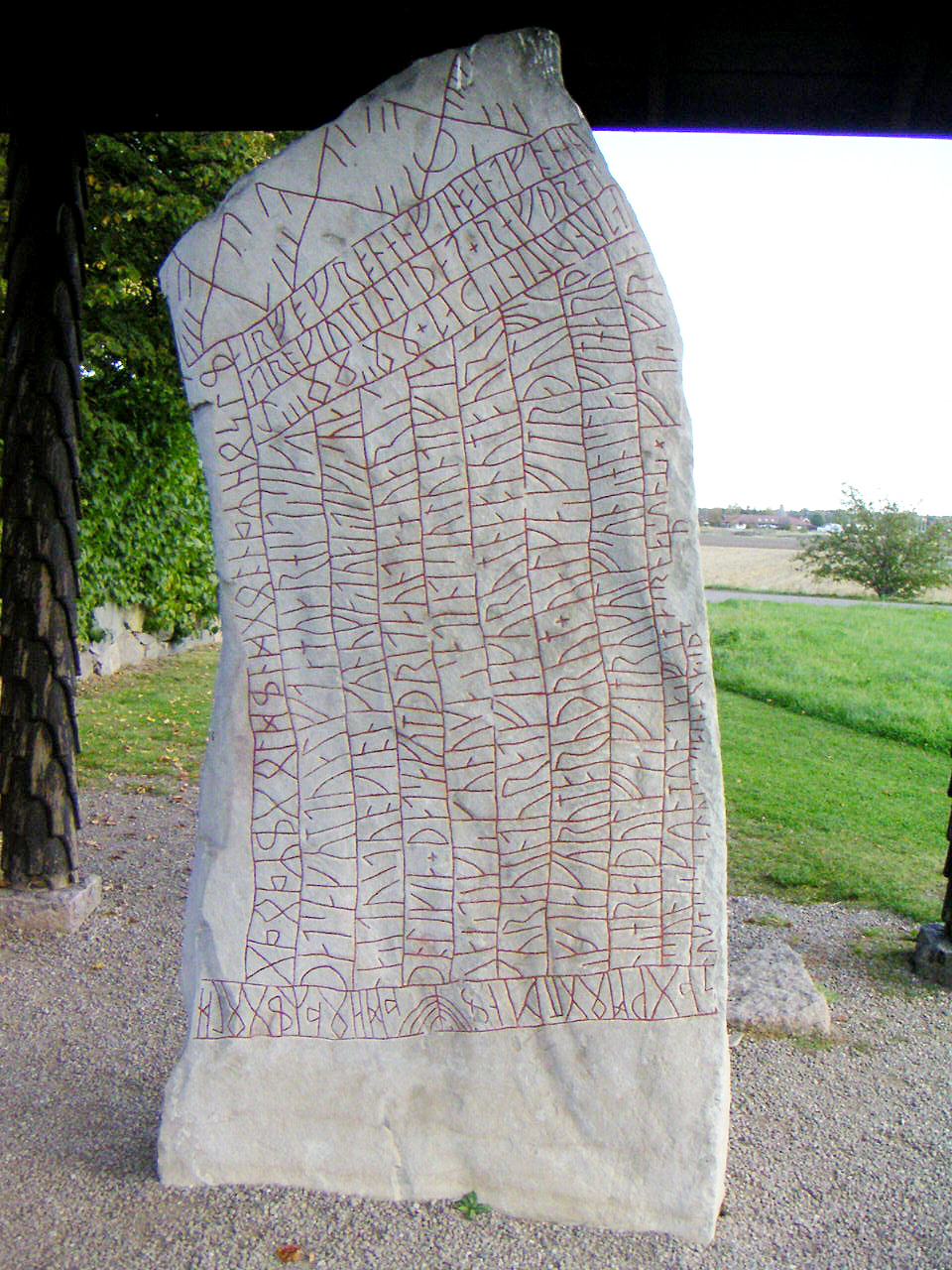
The Rök runestone, Sweden, features 'tent runes' in its uppermost row. Centered in the bottom row is a hook rune.

Cipher runes, or cryptic runes, are the cryptographical replacement of the letters of the runic alphabet.

== Preservation ==
The knowledge of cipher runes was best preserved in Iceland, and during the 17th–18th centuries, Icelandic scholars produced several treatises on the subject. The most notable of these is the manuscript Runologia by Jón Ólafsson (1705–1779), which he wrote in Copenhagen (1732–1752). It thoroughly treats numerous cipher runes and runic ciphers, and it is now preserved in the Arnamagnæan Institute in Copenhagen.

Jón Ólafsson's treatise presents the Younger Futhark in the Viking Age order, which means that the m-rune precedes the l-rune. This small detail was of paramount importance for the interpretation of Viking Age cipher runes because in the 13th century the two runes had changed places through the influence of the Latin alphabet where l precedes m. Since the medieval runic calendar used the post-13th-century order, the early runologists of the 17th–18th centuries believed that the l-m order was the original one, and the order of the runes is of vital importance for the interpretation of cipher runes.

== Structure of the ciphers ==
In the runic alphabet, the runes have their special order and are divided into groups. In the Younger Futhark, which has 16 letters, they are divided into three groups. The Icelandic tradition calls the first group (f, u, þ, ã, r and k) "Freyr's ætt", the second group (h, n, i, a and s) "Hagal's ætt" and the third group (t, b, m, l and ʀ) "Tyr's ætt". In order to make the inscription even harder to decipher, Freyr's ætt and Tyr's ætt change places so that group one is group three and vice versa. However, in several cases the ætts are counted in their correct order, and not backwards. There are numerous forms of cipher runes, but they are all based on the principle of giving the number of the ætt and the number of the rune within the ætt.

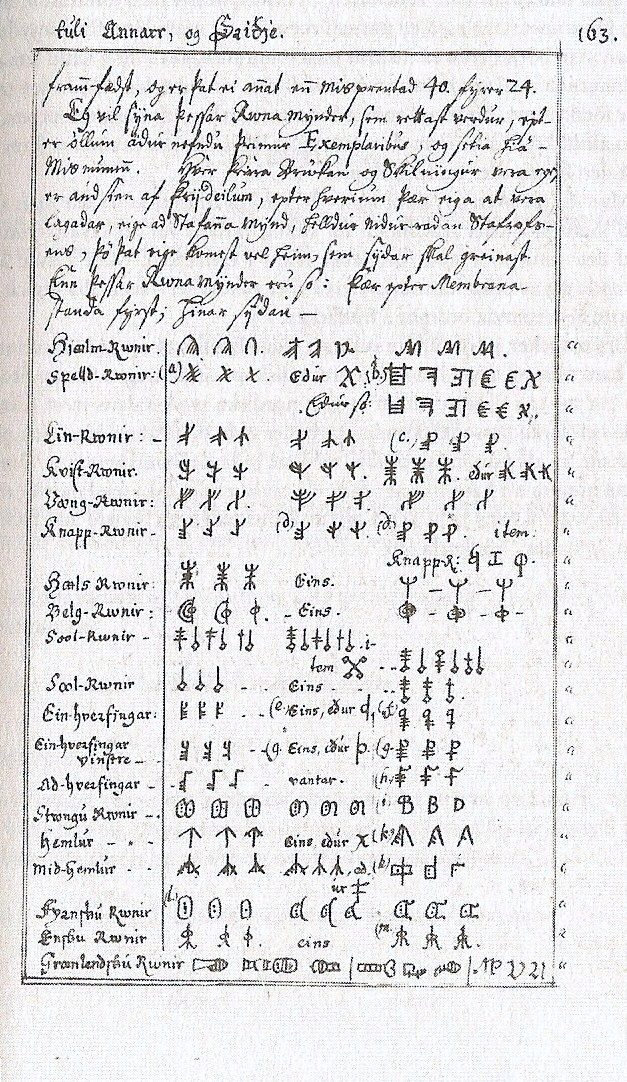
A page from the 18th-century manuscript by the Icelander Jón Ólafsson, which deciphered the cryptic runes for Continental Scandinavian scholars. This page shows different types.

The tent runes are based on strokes added to the four arms of an X shape: Each X represents two runes and is read clockwise, starting with the top left arm. The strokes on the first arm representing the ætt (row of eight runes: (1) fuþarkgw, (2) hnijæpzs, (3) tbemlŋod), the strokes on the second arm denote the order within that ætt.

The branch runes are similar, the strokes being attached to a vertical stem and branching upwards. Strokes on the left indicate the ætt, and strokes on the right the order within the ætt.

There are variants of these two schemes, such as inverting the numbers (counting backwards the ætts, and the runes within the ætts). Tree runes and hook runes are like branch runes, with the strokes pointing downward diagonally and curving downward, respectively. These may be mixed: in the phrase ek vitki at left, ek is written in straightforward branch runes, but vitki is written with the ætts as hooks and the order as branches.

There are several runestones using such devices of obscuring the inscription, especially found in Orkney.

A comparable system of letter modification is that of the Ogham "scales" recorded in the Ogam Tract.

== See also ==
- Bind rune
- List of runestones
- Ogham
- Pseudo-runes
