= Gothic alphabet =

Alphabet used for writing the Gothic language

Gothic
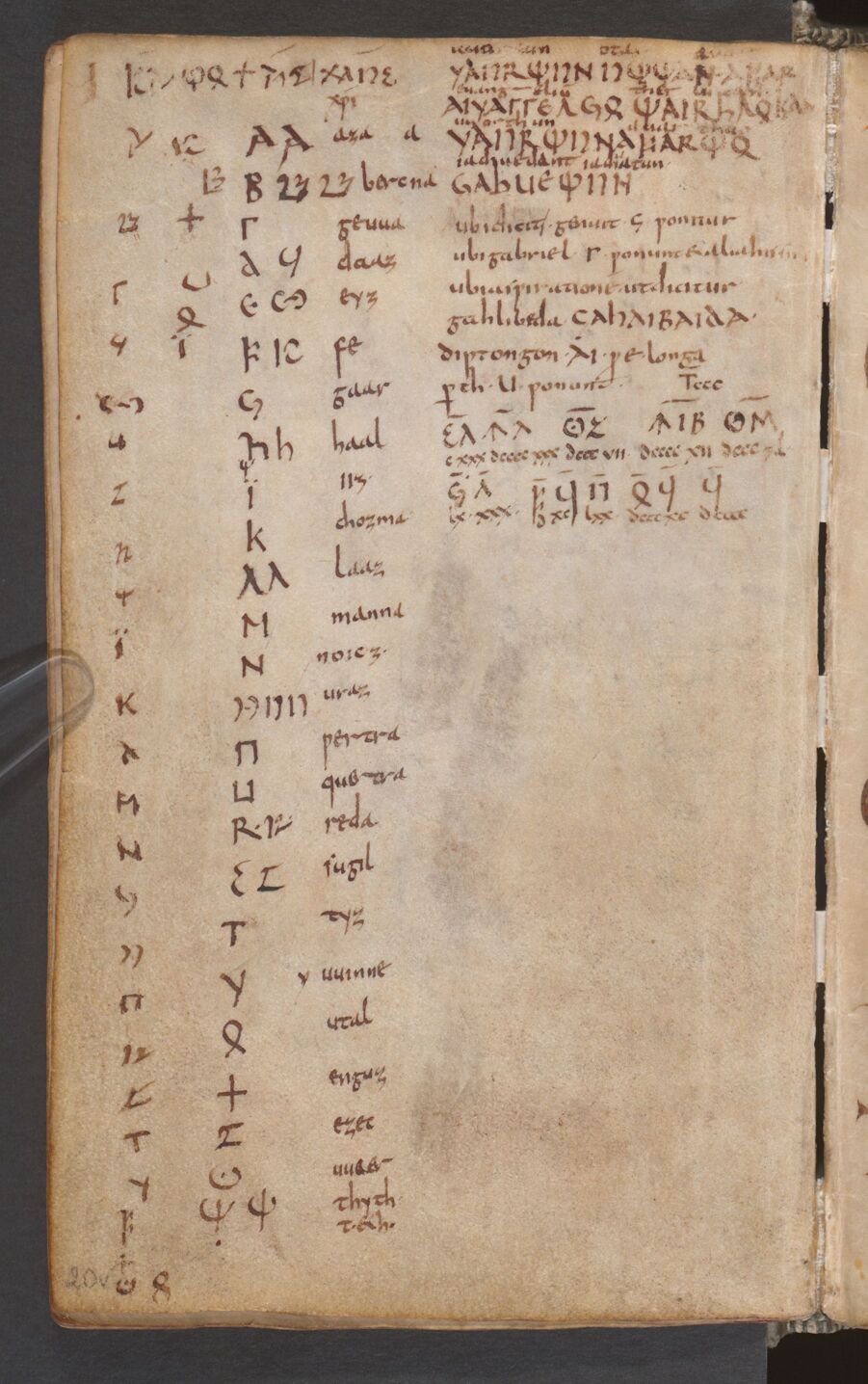
- Script type: Alphabet
- Period: From c. 350, in decline by 600
- Direction: Left-to-right
- Languages: Gothic

Related scripts
- Parent systems: Greek alphabet augmented with Latin and possibly Runic (questionable): Gothic

ISO 15924
- ISO 15924: Goth (206), Gothic

Unicode
- Unicode alias: Gothic
- Unicode range: U+10330–U+1034F

The Gothic alphabet is an alphabet for writing the Gothic language. It was developed in the 4th century AD by Ulfilas (or Wulfila), a Gothic preacher of Cappadocian Greek descent, for the purpose of translating the Bible. (Note: According to the testimony of the historians Philostorgius, Socrates of Constantinople and Sozomen.)

In form, most letters resemble letters of the Greek alphabet. The origin of the alphabet is disputed: it is debated whether (or how) the Latin and Runic alphabets were used as a source. The set of letters, and the way that they are used, show some innovations to express Gothic phonology.

== Origin ==
The origin of the Gothic alphabet is controversial. In addition to the Gothic language, Ulfilas knew Greek and Latin. When developing the Gothic alphabet, he may have drawn on the Greek alphabet, Latin alphabet, and Runic alphabet. According to Cercignani, it is generally agreed that Ulfilas had knowledge of each of these three alphabets. However, this has been debated. It is not known that Ulfilas was familiar with runes; on the other hand, there is also lack of evidence showing that Ulfilas was unfamiliar with runes. There are a few extant runic inscriptions thought to be East Germanic, possibly Gothic (see Gothic runic inscriptions). The influence of Latin and Runic letters on the Gothic alphabet is disputed, and some scholars have argued that they were not used as inputs.

Cercignani (1988:172–178) supposes that Ulfilas used a twenty-four letter Runic fuþark alphabet as his starting point and assigned most of its letters to corresponding letters of the twenty-seven letter Greek alphabet, taking the value of the Greek letters as numerals and their alphabetical position, and using additional symbols (some taken from the Latin alphabet) to take the place of remaining unmatched Greek letters. After the correspondences were established, Cercignani supposes the form of the Runic letters were either modified or outright replaced by the corresponding Latin or Greek letters. Miller (2019:25) calls Cercignani's hypothesis of an adapted runic alphabet "not implausible".

Snædal (2015:96–97, 104–105) argues that Ulfilas's alphabet was initially and primarily adapted from the Greek alphabet (cursive and perhaps also uncial), with secondary influence from Latin and only minor, uncertain influence from Runic.

Miller (2019:25) cites a number of authors that consider the Gothic alphabet to be derived from the Greek alphabet, influenced by Latin and Runic.

Ulfilas is thought to have consciously chosen to avoid the use of the older Runic alphabet for this purpose, as it was heavily connected with pagan beliefs and customs. Also, the Greek-based script probably helped to integrate the Gothic nation into the dominant Greco-Roman culture around the Black Sea.

== Letters ==
Below is a table of the Gothic alphabet. Two letters used in its transliteration are not used in current English: thorn ⟨þ⟩ (representing /θ/), and hwair ⟨ƕ⟩ (representing /hʷ/).

As with the Greek alphabet, Gothic letters were also assigned numerical values. When used as numerals, letters were written either between two dots (•𐌹𐌱• = 12) or with an overline (𐌹̅𐌱̅ = 12). Two letters, 𐍁 (90) and 𐍊 (900), have no phonetic value.

Names for the letters are recorded in Codex Vindobonensis 795, a 9th-century manuscript of Alcuin. Most of them seem to be Gothic forms of names also appearing in the rune poems. The antiquity of these names is not certain: Cercignani (1988:172, 178–180) argues that the names recorded in this manuscript may be influenced by Old English and Old High German, and concludes that the original rune names are unknown. Most of the names follow the principle of acrophony (starting with the sound that the letter represents), which Cercignani argues must have been a feature of the original names used by Ulfilas. In the following table, the names are given in their attested forms followed by reconstructed Gothic forms and their meanings. (Note: The forms which are not attested in the Gothic corpus are marked with an asterisk. For a detailed discussion of the reconstructed forms, cf. For a survey of the relevant literature, cf.)

| Letter | Translit. | Compare | Alcuinic name | Gothic name | PGmc rune name | IPA | Numeric value | XML entity |
|---|---|---|---|---|---|---|---|---|
| 𐌰 | a | Α | aza | *𐌰𐌽𐍃 (*ans) "god" or *𐌰𐍃𐌺𐍃 (*asks) "ash" | *ansuz | /a, aː/ | 1 | &#x10330; |
| 𐌱 | b | Β | bercna | *𐌱𐌰𐌹𐍂𐌺𐌰𐌽 (*baírkan) "birch" | *berkanan | /b/ [b, β] | 2 | &#x10331; |
| 𐌲 | g | Γ | geuua | 𐌲𐌹𐌱𐌰 (giba) "gift" | *gebō | /ɡ/ [ɡ, ɣ, x]; /n/ [ŋ] | 3 | &#x10332; |
| 𐌳 | d | Δ | daaz | 𐌳𐌰𐌲𐍃 (dags) "day" | *dagaz | /d/ [d, ð] | 4 | &#x10333; |
| 𐌴 | e (ē) | Ε (ϵ) | eyz | *𐌰𐌹𐍈𐍃 (*aíƕs) "horse" or *𐌴𐌹𐍅𐍃 (*eiws) "yew" | *ehwaz, *eihwaz | /eː/ | 5 | &#x10334; |
| 𐌵 | q | (Ϛ), ϰ, Ⲋ(?) | quertra | *𐌵𐌰𐌹𐍂𐌸𐍂𐌰 (*qaírþra) ??? or *𐌵𐌰𐌹𐍂𐌽𐌰 (*qaírna) "millstone" | (see *perþō) | /kʷ/ | 6 | &#x10335; |
| 𐌶 | z | Ζ | ezec | (?) (Note: Zacher arrives at *iuya, *iwja or *ius, cognate to ON ȳr, OE īw, ēow, OHG īwa "yew tree", though he admits having no ready explanation for the form ezec; cf.) Likely related to *idzēta. | (?) (Note: conventionally called *algiz or *elhaz, but unclear original name) | /z/ | 7 | &#x10336; |
| 𐌷 | h | Η | haal | *𐌷𐌰𐌲𐌰𐌻 (*hagal) or *𐌷𐌰𐌲𐌻𐍃 (*hagls) "hail" | *haglaz/*haglan | /h/ | 8 | &#x10337; |
| 𐌸 | þ (th) | Φ, Ψ, Ⲑ | thyth | 𐌸𐌹𐌿𐌸 (þiuþ) "good"(?) (Note: Zacher assents to a hypothesis of the Brothers Grimm that the Alcuin name "thyth" is not Germanic, but instead is a phonetic adaptation of the name of Greek theta. Based on comparison with Old English, Zacher reconstructs 𐌸𐌰𐌿𐍂𐌽𐌿𐍃 (þaúrnus) "thorn" as the original Gothic rune name (this name was also previously postulated by Munch).) | disputed (see *Thurisaz) | /θ/ | 9 | &#x10338; |
| 𐌹 | i | Ι | iiz | *𐌴𐌹𐍃 (*eis) "ice" | *īsaz/*īsan | /i/ | 10 | &#x10339; |
| 𐌺 | k | Κ | chozma | *𐌺𐌿𐍃𐌼𐌰 (*kusma) or *𐌺𐍉𐌽𐌾𐌰 (*kōnja) "pine sap" | *kaunan | /k/ | 20 | &#x1033A; |
| 𐌻 | l | Λ | laaz | *𐌻𐌰𐌲𐌿𐍃 (*lagus) "sea, lake" | *laguz | /l/ | 30 | &#x1033B; |
| 𐌼 | m | Μ | manna | 𐌼𐌰𐌽𐌽𐌰 (manna) "man, human" | *mannaz | /m/ | 40 | &#x1033C; |
| 𐌽 | n | Ν | noicz | 𐌽𐌰𐌿𐌸𐍃 (náuþs) "need" | *naudiz | /n/ | 50 | &#x1033D; |
| 𐌾 | j | G, ᛃ, Ⲝ(?) | gaar | 𐌾𐌴𐍂 (jēr) "year, harvest" | *jēran | /j/ | 60 | &#x1033E; |
| 𐌿 | u | ᚢ, Ⲟ(?) | uraz | *𐌿𐍂𐌿𐍃 (*ūrus) "aurochs" | *ūruz | /u, uː/ | 70 | &#x1033F; |
| 𐍀 | p | Π | pertra | *𐍀𐌰𐌹𐍂𐌸𐍂𐌰 (*paírþra) ??? | *perþō | /p/ | 80 | &#x10340; |
| 𐍁 | | Ϙ | | | | | 90 | &#x10341; |
| 𐍂 | r | R, Ρ | reda | *𐍂𐌰𐌹𐌳𐌰 (*ráida) "wagon" | *raidō | /r/ | 100 | &#x10342; |
| 𐍃 | s | S, Ϲ | sugil | 𐍃𐌰𐌿𐌹𐌻 (sauil) "sun" or *𐍃𐍉𐌾𐌹𐌻 (*sōjil) "sun" | *sôwilô | /s/ | 200 | &#x10343; |
| 𐍄 | t | Τ | tyz | *𐍄𐌹𐌿𐍃 (*tius) "the god Týr" | *tīwaz | /t/ | 300 | &#x10344; |
| 𐍅 | w | Υ | uuinne | 𐍅𐌹𐌽𐌾𐌰 (winja) "field, pasture" or 𐍅𐌹𐌽𐌽𐌰 (winna) "pain" | *wunjō | /w/; /y/~/i/(?) | 400 | &#x10345; |
| 𐍆 | f | Ϝ, F, Ⲫ(?) | fe | 𐍆𐌰𐌹𐌷𐌿 (faíhu) "wealth, chattel" | *fehu | /ɸ/ | 500 | &#x10346; |
| 𐍇 | x | Χ | enguz | *𐌹𐌲𐌲𐌿𐍃 (*iggus) or *𐌹𐌲𐌲𐍅𐍃 (*iggws) "the god Yngvi" | *ingwaz | /k/ | 600 | &#x10347; |
| 𐍈 | ƕ (hw) | Θ, Ⲯ(?) | uuaer | *𐍈𐌰𐌹𐍂 (*hwair) "kettle" | | /hʷ/~/ʍ/ | 700 | &#x10348; |
| 𐍉 | o (ō) | Ω, Ο, ᛟ, Ⲱ | utal | *𐍉𐌸𐌰𐌻 (*ōþal) "ancestral land" | *ōþala | /oː/ | 800 | &#x10349; |
| 𐍊 | | Ͳ (Ϡ) | | | | | 900 | &#x1034a; |

𐍇 (x) is only used in proper names and loanwords containing Greek Χ (xristus "Christ", galiugaxristus "Pseudo-Christ", zaxarias "Zacharias", aiwxaristia "eucharist").

The letter/numeral 𐍊 (900) is not attested in the Gothic bible, but only in the Salzburg-Vienna manuscript (Codex Vindobonensis 795).

== Letter origins ==
Most of the letters clearly bear a one-to-one correspondence to matching letters of the Greek alphabet, having similar forms and sounds and sharing the same value as numerals.

However, a few letters have uncertain or disputed origins, and may have been taken from Latin or possibly (more controversially) Runic letters. These are:

- 𐌵 (q). Its numeric value of 6 corresponds to Greek digamma or stigma, which may also be the source of its form. Other possible sources are a cursive variant of kappa (ϰ), which could strongly resemble a u, or Latin minuscule q.
- 𐌷 (h). Its numeric value of 8 corresponds to Greek eta (η). Its form and phonetic value may be borrowed from Latin uncial h; however, Snædal (2015:98) argues that there is no need to use Latin to explain the form or sound value of the Gothic letter.
- 𐌸 (þ). Its numeric value of 9 corresponds to Greek theta (θ) /θ/. It is used for theta in the Gothic transcription of Greek names, such as 𐍄𐌴𐌹𐌼𐌰𐌿𐌸𐌰𐌹𐌿𐍃 (teimauþaius) for Τιμόθεος. Its form may be derived from theta via the 4th-century cursive form ϑ. Alternatively, its form has been argued to derive from Greek phi (Φ) /f/ or psi (Ψ) /ps/ with phonetic reassignment, or from Runic ᚦ, which had a φ-shaped variant around the time of the creation of the Gothic alphabet.
- 𐌾 (j). Its numeric value of 60 corresponds to Greek xi (ξ) /ks/. Its form may be derived from Latin G /ɡ/, Greek ξ, the Greek epsilon-iota ligature, or Runic ᛃ (the last of which is itself speculated to be derived from Greek epsilon-iota ligature).
- 𐌿 (u). Its numeric value of 70 corresponds to Greek omicron (ο) (originally named οὖ /uː/). Its form may be derived from Greek ο or from Runic ᚢ /u/.
- 𐍈 (ƕ). Its numeric value of 700 corresponds to Greek psi (ψ) /ps/. Its form is potentially derived from Greek Θ /θ/ with phonetic reassignment; or from Greek Ο /o/; possibly the letterform was switched with 𐌸; also possibly pictographic in nature, with O for rounding and • for aspiration.
- 𐍉 (o). Its numeric value of 800 corresponds to Greek omega (ω). Its form may be derived from Greek ω or from Runic ᛟ. An alternative proposal derives it from a cursive form of Greek omicron (ο): Snædal (2015:103) argues that this better matches the shape of the Gothic letter (though the variant of Greek omicron is often vertically mirrored compared to the Gothic letter), and that the use of Greek omicron to represent close-mid /o/ would be symmetrical to the use of Greek epsilon to represent close-mid /e/. On the other hand, Miller argues that the idea that 𐍉 was derived from omicron does not explain why it has the same numerical value and alphabetical position as omega, with the (pronounced) Gothic alphabet being ordered from 𐌰 to 𐍉 like the Greek alphabet is ordered from Α to Ω.

𐍂 (r), 𐍃 (s) and 𐍆 (f) appear to be derived from their Latin equivalents rather than from the Greek, although the equivalent Runic letters (ᚱ, ᛋ and ᚠ), assumed to have been part of the Gothic futhark, possibly played some role in this choice. However, Snædal claims that "Wulfila's knowledge of runes was questionable to say the least", as the paucity of inscriptions attests that knowledge and use of runes was rare among the East Germanic peoples. Miller refutes this claim, stating that it is "not implausible" that Wulfila used a runic script in his creation of the Gothic alphabet, noting six other authors—Wimmer, Mensel, Hermann, d'Alquen, Rousseau, and Falluomini—who support the idea of the Gothic alphabet having runic contributions. Some variants of 𐍃 (s) are shaped like a sigma and more obviously derive from the Greek Σ.

== Diacritics and punctuation ==
Diacritics and punctuation used in the Codex Argenteus include a trema (◌̈) placed on 𐌹i, transliterated as ï (used at the start of a word or syllable); the interpunct (·) and colon (:) as well as overlines to indicate sigla (such as x̅a̅u̅s̅ for xristaus) and numerals.

== Unicode ==
The Gothic alphabet was added to the Unicode Standard in March 2001 with the release of version 3.1.

The Unicode block for Gothic is U+10330–U+1034F in the Supplementary Multilingual Plane. As older software that uses UCS-2 (the predecessor of UTF-16) assumes that all Unicode codepoints can be expressed as 16 bit numbers (U+FFFF or lower, the Basic Multilingual Plane), problems may be encountered using the Gothic alphabet Unicode range and others outside of the Basic Multilingual Plane.

Gothic^{[1]}^{[2]} Official Unicode Consortium code chart (PDF)
| | 0 | 1 | 2 | 3 | 4 | 5 | 6 | 7 | 8 | 9 | A | B | C | D | E | F |
| U+1033x | 𐌰 | 𐌱 | 𐌲 | 𐌳 | 𐌴 | 𐌵 | 𐌶 | 𐌷 | 𐌸 | 𐌹 | 𐌺 | 𐌻 | 𐌼 | 𐌽 | 𐌾 | 𐌿 |
| U+1034x | 𐍀 | 𐍁 | 𐍂 | 𐍃 | 𐍄 | 𐍅 | 𐍆 | 𐍇 | 𐍈 | 𐍉 | 𐍊 | | | | | |
Notes 1.As of Unicode version 18.0 2.Grey areas indicate non-assigned code points

== See also ==
- Ring of Pietroassa
- Help:Gothic Unicode Fonts

== Sources ==
- Cercignani, Fausto (1988). "The Elaboration of the Gothic Alphabet and Orthography". Indogermanische Forschungen. 93: 168–185. doi:10.1515/9783110243352.168.
- Friesen, Otto von (1915). Hoops, J. (ed.). "Gotische Schrift". Reallexikon der Germanischen Altertumskunde. 2. Strassburg: Karl J. Trübner: 306–310.
- Haarmann, Harald (1991). Universalgeschichte der Schrift. Frankfurt: Campus. ISBN 3-593-34346-0.
- Jensen, Hans (1969). Die Schrift in Vergangenheit und Gegenwart. Berlin: Deutscher Verlag der Wissenschaften.
- Kirchhoff, Adolf (1854). Das gothische Runenalphabet (in German). Berlin: Wilhelm Hertz. OCLC 1042908167. OL 14002786M.
- Marchand, James (1973). The Sounds and Phonemes of Wulfila's Gothic. De Gruyter Mouton.
- Mees, Bernard (2002–2003). "Runo-Gothica: the runes and the origin of Wulfila's script". Die Sprache. 43: 55–79.
- Miller, D. Gary (2019). The Oxford Gothic Grammar. Oxford: Oxford University Press.
- Snædal, Magnús (2015). "Gothic Contact with Latin: Gotica Parisina and Wulfila's Alphabet". In Askedal, John Ole; Nielsen, Hans Frede (eds.). Early Germanic Languages in Contact. NOWELE Supplement Series. Vol. 27. pp. 91–107. doi:10.1075/nss.27.05sna. ISBN 978-90-272-4073-6.
- Streitberg, Wilhelm (1910). Gotisches Elementarbuch (in German). Heidelberg: Carl Winter.
- Wright, Joseph (1910). Grammar of the Gothic Language. Oxford: Oxford University Press.
- Zacher, Julius (1855). Das gothische Alphabet Vulfilas und das Runenalphabet (in German). Leipzig: F. A. Brockhaus. OCLC 64740461. OL 20520460M.
