= Raymond E. Page =

American landscape architect

Raymond E. Page (1895–1992) was a Southern California-based landscape architect, best known for his work at Pickford, the Beverly Hills home of Mary Pickford and Douglas Fairbanks. Page graduated from Throop Polytechnic Institute in 1912; he was the first president of the California Board of Landscape Architects and an emeritus fellow of the American Society of Landscape Architects. His clients included Jack Benny, Will Rogers, Charlie Chaplin, and Gregory Peck.
