= Ur (rune) =

Runic alphabet letter

Name	Proto-Germanic	Old English		Old Norse	
Name	*Ūruz/*Ūrą	Úr	Ýr	Úr	stung Úr
Name	"aurochs"/"water"	"aurochs"	?	"precipitation"	
Shape	Elder Futhark	Futhorc		Younger Futhark	
Unicode	ᚢ U+16A2	ᚢ U+16A2	ᚣ U+16A3	ᚢ U+16A2	ᚤ U+16A4
Transliteration	u	u	y	u	y
Transcription	u	u	y	u, o, y, œ w / v	y, œ v
IPA	[u(ː)]	[u(ː)]	[y(ː)]	[u] [ø] [y] [œ] [v] [w]	[y] [œ] [v]
Position in rune-row	2	2	27	2₁	2₂

Ur is the recorded name for the rune ᚢ in both Old English and Old Norse, found as the second rune in all futharks (runic alphabets starting with F, U, Þ, Ą, R, K), i.e. the Germanic Elder Futhark, the Anglo-Frisian Futhorc and the Norse Younger Futhark, with continued use in the later medieval runes, early modern runes and Dalecarlian runes.

It corresponds to the letter u in the Latin alphabet, but also carries other sound values, especially in Younger Futhark, where its sound values correspond to the vowels: [u], [ø], [y] and [œ] etc., and the consonants: [v] and [w] etc., in the Latin alphabet.

The rune is recorded in all rune poem traditions, where its name is given different meanings. Old English has the meaning of "aurochs" (lit. 'ur-ox'), while the Norse poems has the meaning of precipitation (in the Norwegian poem "sparks", a type of figurative "rain").

== Character ==
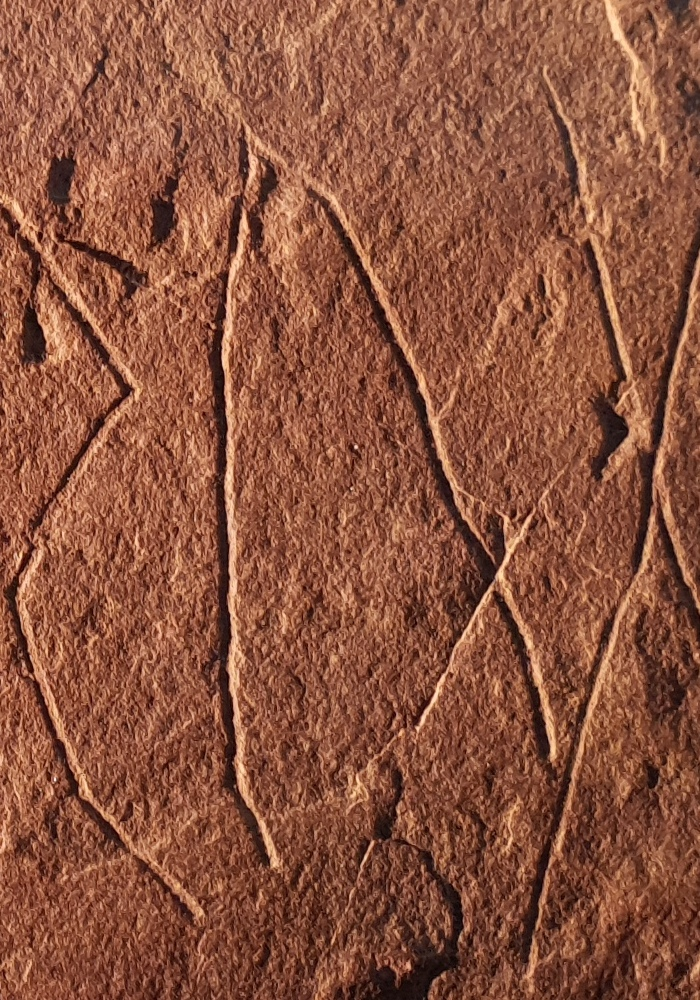
Ur depicted on the oldest datable runestone, the Hole Runestone (50 BC–275 AD).

The character ᚢ may have been derived from the Old Italic scripts, as such features various characters corresponding to elder runes, including both upside and downside characters for Upsilon (/u, y/):,, specifically the East Rhaetic alphabet from the Magrè-region of north-east Italy, which primarily used the downside Old Italic Upsilon.

	→		→		→		→	ᚢ
Phoenician waw		West Greek; Upsilon		West Rhaetic; Upsilon		East Rhaetic; Upsilon		Germanic rune Ur

The character was later reused as the 16th letter in the Gothic alphabet (𐌿), the corresponding name being urus.

== Proto-Germanic name ==
The rune is recorded in all three rune poems (Old English, Norwegian, Icelandic), and it is called Ur in all, however with different meanings in each.

Because of this, it is difficult to reconstruct a Proto-Germanic name for the Elder Futhark rune. It may have been *ūruz "aurochs" (see also Bull worship), based on the Old English rune poem, the oldest recorded of the three, supported by the corresponding Gothic name uraz, recorded by Alcuin of York in the 8th century, or *ūrą "water", based on the Icelandic rune poems (and to some extent the Norwegian rune poem), with both Proto-Germanic words, however, possibly stemming from the same root.

The aurochs name is preferred by authors of modern runic divination systems, but both seem possible, compared to the names of the other runes: "water" would be comparable to "hail" and "lake", and "aurochs" to "horse" or "elk" (although the latter name is itself uncertain). The Gothic alphabet seems to support "aurochs" as the prior name, though: as the name of the letter 𐌿 u is urus.

== Anglo-Saxon name ==
In the Old English rune poem, recorded in the 8th or 9th century, the rune is named Ūr, Old English for “aurochs” (compare with Old Norse: úrr), stemming from a Proto-Germanic word: *ūruz.

Old English rune poem

Old English:	ᚢ [Ur] bẏþ anmod ond oferhẏrned, felafrecne deor, feohteþ mid hornum mære morstapa; þæt is modig ƿuht.
Paraphrased:	The aurochs is proud and has great horns; it is a very savage beast and fights with its horns; a great ranger of the moors, it is a creature of mettle.

== Old Norse name ==
The Old Norse name is variously recorded as Ur, meaning some type of cold damp and windy precipitation weather, but the definition warries slightly between the Nordic languages.

In Old Icelandic, the word úr is recorded as meaning "drizzle", "light rain" and thereof, in the sense of "cold and damp weather". In Old and Contemporary Swedish, the word (ur) essentially means "blustery and profuse snowfall, sleet or rain" etc, if not outright "bad weather". The Gotlandic variation starur ("starling-ur") specifically refers to the last snowfall of the season. In Danish and Norwegian, the word (ur) is said to mean "northern rainclouds", or just "rainclouds", but also "cold, biting draft" and thereof etc.

There is also a variant, ýr (yr), in all Nordic languages, meaning "drizzle" in Old Icelandic, including "fine dense snowfall" and "snowstorm" in Norwegian and Swedish. A derivative, yra, a verb, also exist, meaning "to drizzle" and thereof in Old Icelandic, and "swirl, whirl, drift", in the sense of snow, sand, dust affected by the wind, in Swedish, etc.

Úr is related to Old English: ēar, "wave, sea", potentially also "urine". It stems from a Proto-Germanic word: *ūrą, possibly begun by a w-, as found in related words (Swedish: var, "pus", Old English: wær, "sea") and historical variants of úr (Old Swedish: vur), as Proto-Germanic words starting with a w, followed by o or u, generally lost the w-sound when evolving from Proto-Norse into Old Norse (compare Proto-Germanic: *wulfaz, "wolf", Old Norse: ulfr).

=== Norwegian rune poem ===
The Norwegian rune poem is the earliest recorded Norse rune poem, recorded in the 13th century. It records the name as úr, but uses it in a unique sense not recorded elsewhere.

ᚢ Úr er af illu/eldu járne; opt løypr ræinn á hjarne.

Translation:

*Sparks are of ill/fired iron; often leap (strut) the reindeer over the frozen snow.

The A-side kenning appears to entail "sparks", a figurative type of "bad rain". It may have mythological connotations.

The B-side of the poem connects with the shape of the rune, as it looks like the toe hoof of a raindeer when leaving tracks in snow (ᚢᚢ).

=== Icelandic rune poems ===
In the Icelandic rune poems, recorded in the 16th century, the rune is named úr, describing some type of cold damp and windy precipitation weather.

There are several Icelandic manuscripts with rune poems, all varying to some degree. The oldest manustript, catalogued as AM 687 d 4°, is from around 1500. The second oldest, catalogued as AM 461 12° , is from around 1550. These have been noted to be hard to read, thus the transliterations might be incorrect.

==== AM 687 d 4° ====
AM687d, written around 1500, has lost a lot of readability due to the pergament being folded and damaged over the years, but copies have been made since the 18th century. The original scribe used diacritic abbreviation symbols to save space, which are hard to make out at a first glance. These symbols are based on period Arabic numerals, but are hard to identify, yet appear to be the following, or thereof: -r⁰, -ar¹, -ur², -er³, -re⁴/-ræ⁴, -ra⁵. The poem ends with a Latin translation and a word for leader beginning with the same sound value as the rune.

Below, an attempt at recreating the original text with available Unicode-characters is shown, as to convey how hard the original text is to read. Letter sequences that cannot now be identified are inserted, for convenience of reading, within square brackets [ ], on the evidence either of the available space or of related texts.

Original text:	ᚢ 𝑒⁰ ꞅ𝔨𝑦𝑔𝜄𝑎 𝑔⁵𝑡𝑢ꝛ ƻ ꞅ𝔨æꝛ𝑎 þ𝑢³[rir ok] h𝜄ꝛꝺ𝜄ẞ h𝑎𝑡² 𝒱𝔪𝑏ꝛ𝑒 𝒱𝜄Ꞅ𝜄
Normalized:	Úr er skýgia (Note: Modern Icelandic: skýggja) grátur ok skæra þverrir ok hirðis hatur. Umbre Vísi.
Literal:	Úr is overcast's crying, and hay's thwarting, and shepherd's hatred. Umbre Vísi
Paraphrased:	Drizzle is the cloudcover's weeping, and that which thwarts hay, and the hatred of the shepherd. Umbre (u-spelling of Latin: imber, "rain, storm, stormcloud"), Vísi (v-spelt word for 'leader')

==== AM 461 12° ====
AM461 is slightly younger than AM687d, written around 1550, and less complete, lacking ᛦ [Ýr] for example. It has been noted by American Old Norse scholar Jackson Crawford to be very difficult to make out.

Normalized:	ᚢ Úr er skýja grátur og skárargs gata, þorir^{?} og hirðis hatur, siðförull seggur.
Literal:	Drizzle is skies crying and skárargs^{?} path, the daring^{?} and shepherd's hatred, the late traveling man.^{?}

=== Swedish rune poem ===
The Swedish rune poem was recorded by Johannes Bureus (1568–1652) in the later 1500s from a runic staff thought to be from the same period. He published these in 1599 on a giant runic bronze tablet, called Runakenslanes läraspån (roughly "the teaching of runic feeling"), or Latin: Elementa Runica (lit. 'Runic Elements').

The Swedish rune poem have more in common with the Icelandic rune poem than the Norwegian one, but are much shorter.

Runic:	ᚢᛦ ᛁ Vᛅᛋᛏᛆᚿ Vᛅᚧᚱ
Transliteration:	urr i væstan væđr
Normalized:	Urr i västan vädhr
Current Swedish:	Ur i västanväder
Translation:	"Ur in westward wind"

== Variants ==
=== ᚣ (Ȳr) – Anglo-Frisian Futhorc ===
The Anglo-Frisian Futhark has a modified Ūr ᚢ, fitted with a detached vertical line in the cavity ᚣ, which was given the sound value [y]. It was named Ȳr and corresponded to the letter y in the Latin alphabet.

Its position in the Anglo-Frisian rune-row differs between sources and was probably never standardised, but today it is generally placed at position 27.

=== ᚤ (stung Úr) – Norse Younger Futhark ===
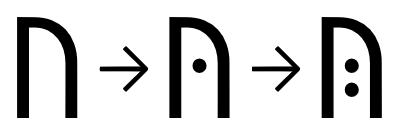
un-stung Ur → single-stung Ur → double-stung Ur

In the 11th century, a new writing rule was introduced to the Younger Futhark, in the form of stung runes (also called dotted runes), in which stings, i.e. dots, could be added to a rune to indicate a secondary sound value, a so called diacritic.

The stung Úr ᚤ primarily carried the sound value [y] in East Norse (Swedish/Danish) and corresponds to the letter y in the Latin alphabet (unicode name: Runic Letter Y). Secondarily, it can also carry the sound value [œ] and seldom even [v], the latter of which was also carried by the stung Fé ᚡ (unicode name: Runic Letter V). In period West Norse (Norwegian/Icelandic), the sound value /y/ was instead commonly carried by the rune Yr ᛦ, as its previous sound value, [ʀ], had evolved into the common /r/ and was thus an obsolete doublet of the rune Reið ᚱ. In the following medieval runic alphabet, the sound value [œ] was covered by its own rune, a reversed Óss ᚯ (unicode: Runic Letter Oe). A double-stung Ur also existed for the sound value /å/, also seldom used for /v/.

Stung runes were originally not seen as separate runes from their base form, they are just runes with added diacritics, and thus were not listed in the Younger Futhark-order. In the later medieval runic alphabet, which followed the Latin alphabetical order of ABCD etc, they instead have the position of their corresponding Latin character.
