= R. I. Page =

British historian and runologist, 1924–2012

R. I. Page FRHistS
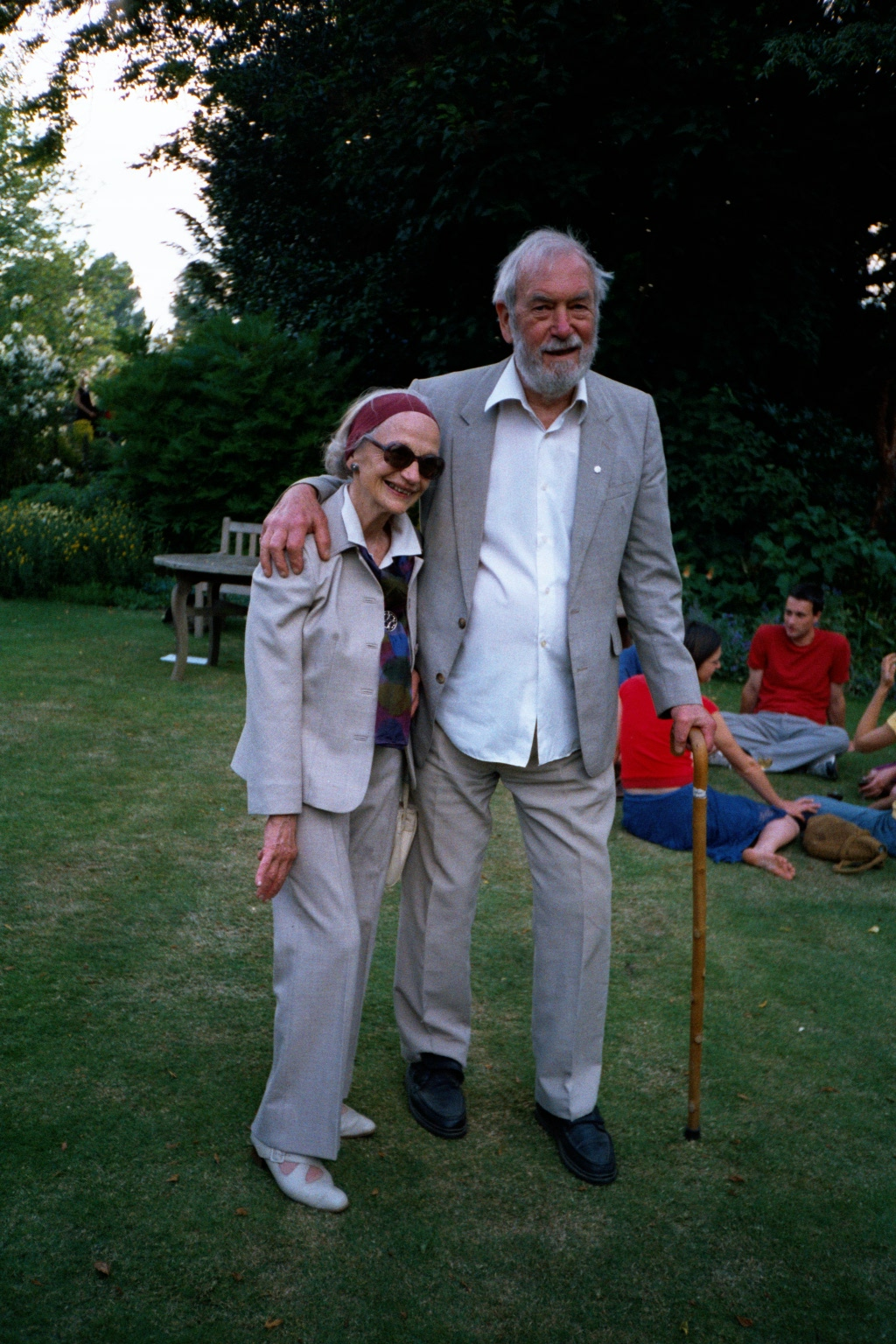
- Raymond Page and Elin Hustad at the ASNaC Garden Party, June 2004
- Born: 25 September 1924; Sheffield, England
- Died: 10 March 2012 (aged 87)
- Spouse: Elin Hustad
- Children: 1

Academic background
- Education: University of Sheffield; University of Copenhagen; University of Nottingham
- Thesis: The Inscriptions of the Anglo-Saxon Rune-Stones (1959)

Academic work
- Discipline: Medieval history
- Sub-discipline: Anglo-Saxon England; Old English; Viking Age; Old Norse; Germanic paganism; Runology
- Institutions: University of Nottingham; Corpus Christi College, Cambridge; Department of Anglo-Saxon, Norse and Celtic, University of Cambridge
- Notable works: An Introduction to English Runes
- Military career
- Allegiance: United Kingdom
- Branch: Royal Navy
- Service years: 1942-1945
- Rank: Sub-lieutenant
- Conflicts: World War II

Raymond Ian Page (25 September 1924 – 10 March 2012) was a British historian of Anglo-Saxon England and the Viking Age. As a renowned runologist, he specialised in the study of Anglo-Saxon runes.

== Biography ==
Page was born in Sheffield in 1924, and was educated at King Edward VII School. His family circumstances required him to leave school at the age of 16. In 1942 he took a course in mechanical engineering at Rotherham Technical College, applying thereafter for a commission in the Royal Navy. After the war, on discharge from the Navy, he was able as an ex-serviceman to obtain a place as an undergraduate at the University of Sheffield. After graduating in English, he spent a year in Copenhagen working on an MA. He then moved to the University of Nottingham, where he was appointed to an assistant lectureship in English in 1951 and completed his doctoral dissertation on The Inscriptions of the Anglo-Saxon Rune-Stones in 1959.

In 1962, Page joined the faculty at the University of Cambridge, where he was a lecturer, and later reader, in Old Norse language and literature. In 1965 he was appointed Parker Librarian at the Parker Library, Corpus Christi College, and in 1984 he was appointed Elrington and Bosworth Professor of Anglo-Saxon. He held these two prestigious posts until his retirement in 1991.

In 1989-1990 he held the Sandars Readership in Bibliography lecturing on "Matthew Parker, Archbishop of Canterbury, and his books."

He continued to work at Corpus Christi after his retirement in an out-of-the-way office which he called 'Paradise' because it was so hard to reach.

== Academic reputation ==
Rudolf Simek said that Page "is widely acknowledged as the authority on Old English runes". Professor Elmer Antonsen of the University of Illinois at Urbana–Champaign has noted that "serious study of English runes without Raymond Ian Page... is simply inconceivable"; others praise him as a "meticulous scholar". Page's An Introduction to English Runes was first published in 1973, and revised and republished in 1999. Page intended it as a prefatory publication to a complete corpus edition of Anglo-Saxon runes, and it was praised for, among other qualities, its "healthy skepticism". Even in 2003, it remained "the only book-length study providing a comprehensive and scholarly guide to the Anglo-Saxon use of runes", and the revised edition was deemed as authoritative as the first one was in the 1970s. Much of his work was aimed at a general readership, but many of his scholarly articles were collected in 1995 in Runes and Runic Inscriptions: Collected Essays on Anglo-Saxon and Viking Runes.

Page called himself a 'sceptical' runologist, demonstrating that runes were most often used for mundane purposes and arguing against their 'romantic' association with the occult.

In 1996 he was awarded an honorary doctorate at The Norwegian University of Science and Technology (NTNU).

== Personal life ==
In 1953 Page married Elin Hustad; they had two daughters and a son. True to his Yorkshire roots, he would not permit red roses in his garden. Known as a connoisseur of real ale and single-malt whisky, he was presented on his 70th birthday with an oak manuscript conservation box specially made to contain a bottle of whisky, with its spine embossed with the title The Runes of Jura.

== Works ==
- 1960. Gibbons saga. Copenhagen: Editiones Arnamagnænæ, Series B, vol 2.
- 1970. Life in Anglo-Saxon England. London: Batsford.
- 1973. An Introduction to English Runes. London: Methuen. 2nd ed. Boydell Press, 1999 (2006). ISBN 978-0851159461.
- 1985. Anglo-Saxon Aptitudes. Cambridge: Cambridge University Press. ISBN 0521313880.
- 1987. "A Most Vile People": Early English Historians on the Vikings. London: Viking Society for Northern Research.
- 1987. Runes. (Reading the past series). London: British Museum Press. ISBN 9780714180656.
- 1990. Norse Myths. London: British Museum Press. ISBN 0714120626.
- 1995. Chronicles of the Vikings: Records, Memorials and Myths. London: British Museum Press. ISBN 0-8020-0803-8.
- 1995. Runes and Runic Inscriptions: Collected Essays on Anglo-Saxon and Viking Runes. Woodbridge: Boydell Press. ISBN 0851153879.
- 1999. The Icelandic Rune-Poem. London: Viking Society for Northern Research. ISBN 0903521431.
