= Raido =

Rune

Name	Proto-Germanic	Old English	Old Norse
Name	*Raidō	Rád	Reið
Name	"ride → journey"		
Shape	Elder Futhark	Futhorc	Younger Futhark
Unicode	ᚱ U+16B1		
Transliteration	r		
Transcription	r		
IPA	[r]		
Position in rune-row	5		

*Raidō "ride" (by extension "journey, wagon etc") is the reconstructed Proto-Germanic name of the r- rune of the Elder Futhark ᚱ. The name is attested for the same rune in all three rune poems, Old Norwegian Ræið Icelandic Reið, Anglo-Saxon Rad, as well as for the corresponding letter of the Gothic alphabet 𐍂 r, called raida. The shape of the rune may be directly derived from Latin R.

Rune Poem:	English Translation:
Old Norwegian ᚱ Ræið kveða rossom væsta; Reginn sló sværðet bæzta.	Riding is said to be the worst thing for horses; Reginn forged the finest sword.
Old Icelandic ᚱ Reið er sitjandi sæla ok snúðig ferð ok jórs erfiði. iter ræsir.	Riding is of sitting a blessing and swift journey and horses toiling
Old English ᚱ Rad bẏþ on recẏde rinca gehƿẏlcum sefte ond sƿiþhƿæt, ðamðe sitteþ on ufan meare mægenheardum ofer milpaþas.	Riding seems easy to every warrior while he is indoors and very courageous to him who traverses the high-roads on the back of a stout horse.
