= Codex Vindobonensis 795 =

9th-century manuscript

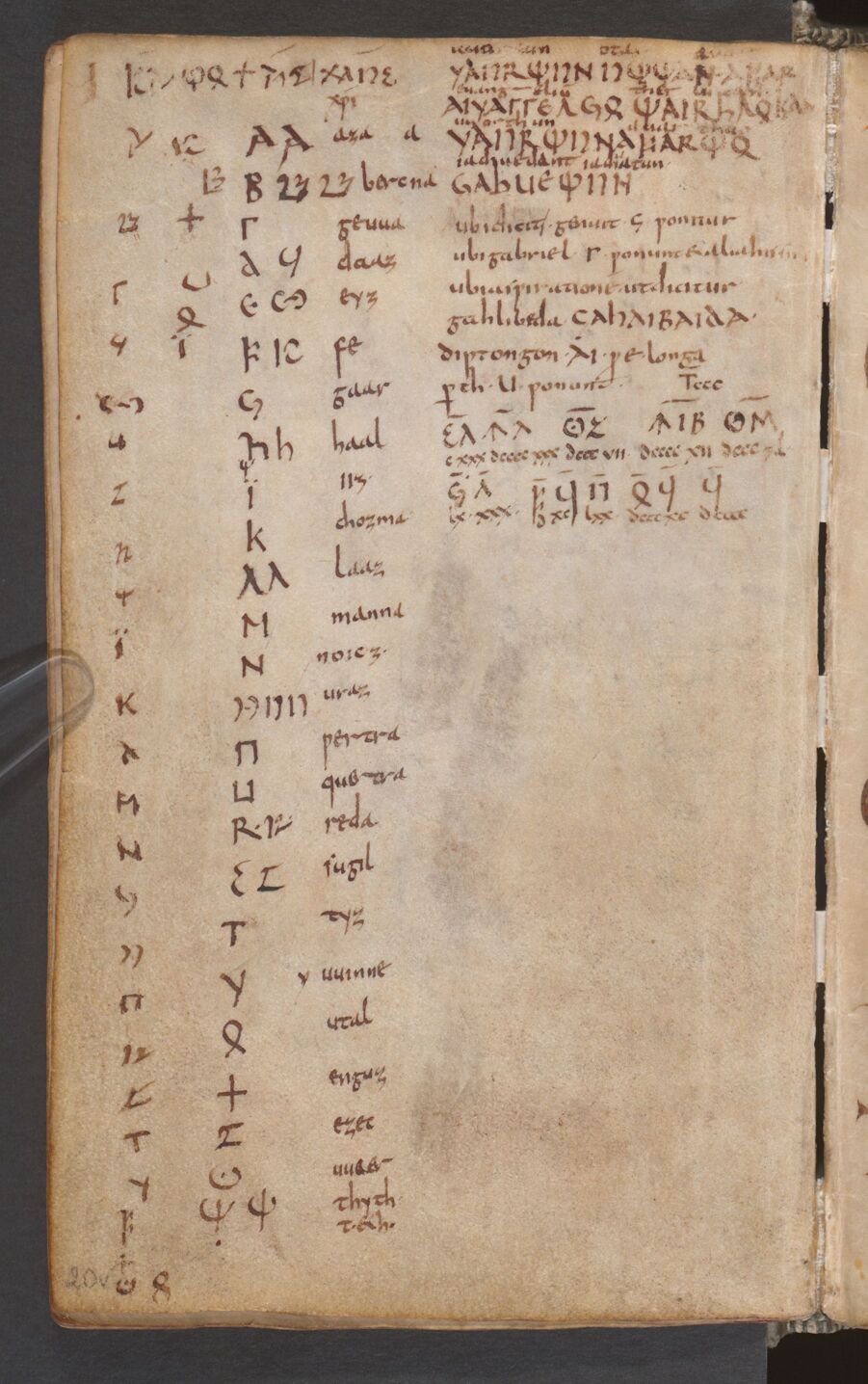
- Codex Vindobonensis 795, folio 20 verso, listing the Gothic alphabet
- Date: c. 798
- Author(s): Alcuin, etc.
- Compiled by: Arno of Salzburg, etc.
- Contents: Assorted letters of Alcuin, guidebooks to the topography of Rome

The Codex Vindobonensis 795 (Vienna Austrian National Library Codex) is a 9th-century manuscript, most likely compiled in 798 or shortly thereafter (after Arno of Salzburg returned from Rome to become archbishop). It contains letters and treatises by Alcuin, including a discussion of the Gothic alphabet. It also contains a description of the Old English runes.

The Codex Vindobonensis 795 is a collection of letters of Alcuin, as compiled by Arno of Salzburg; it also contains two texts about the topography of Rome, particularly its shrines: the Notitia ecclesiarium urbis Romae (Notice of the church of the city of Rome) and the De locis sanctis martyrum quae sunt foris civitatis Romae (The locations of the holy martyrs outside the city of Rome), neither of which were written by Alcuin. The manuscript seems to be an attempt to imagine the reconstruction of Rome, as it also contains correspondence between Arno and Alcuin about the rebuilding of the monastery of St. Stephen's at St. Paul's as well as commentary on the Epistle to the Romans.
