= History of the alphabet =

Alphabetic writing is a writing system in which graphemes (called letters) generally correspond to individual sounds in a language (phonemes). This distinguishes it from writing systems that use symbols to represent syllables or whole words.

The oldest known traces of alphabetic writing have been dated back to the 2nd millennium BC among a community of West Semitic laborers in the Sinai Peninsula. Exposed to the idea of writing through the complex system of Egyptian hieroglyphs used for the Egyptian language, their script instead wrote their native Canaanite language. It has been conjectured that the community selected a small number of the hieroglyphs commonly seen in their surroundings to describe the sounds, as opposed to the semantic values, of their own language. Other examples of earliest known alphabetic writing include "group writing" found in pyramids in Egypt or yet still the systematically-used Ugaritic alphabet in which the oldest known ABC was written. Alphabetic writing spread throughout West and South Asia, North Africa, and Europe during the 1st millennium BC preserving various alphabetical ordering traditions along the way.

Some modern authors distinguish between consonantal alphabets, with the term abjad coined for them in 1996, and true alphabets with letters for both consonants and vowels. In this narrower sense, the first true alphabet would be the Greek alphabet, which was adapted from the Phoenician alphabet. Many linguists are skeptical of the value of wholly separating the two categories. Latin, the most widely used alphabet today, in turn derives from the Etruscan and Greek alphabets, themselves derived from Phoenician.

Writing systems have multiple, sometimes independent attributes such as alphabetical order, letter name or the languages written in it including associated pronunciation of those letters. Studying the attributes of a writing system together as a whole first is an approach that finds its origins in outdated ideas surrounding nationality and religious identity and may produce misleading results. When it comes to language classification for instance, theories such as the wave model may complement or sometimes even supplement the tree model, the latter being more focused on establishing a hierarchy of languages rather than identifying relationships between languages.

== Predecessors ==
Two scripts are well attested from before the end of the 4th millennium BC: Mesopotamian cuneiform and Egyptian hieroglyphs. Hieroglyphs were employed in three ways in Ancient Egyptian texts: as pictograms depicting an object visually (or more complex logograms), as phonograms denoting sounds, or as determinatives which provide clues to meaning without directly writing sounds. Since vowels were mostly unwritten, the hieroglyphs which indicated each single consonant could have been used as a consonantal alphabet, or abjad. This possibility was not realized in Egyptian writing, but seems to have been an influence on the creation of the first alphabet. All subsequent alphabets around the world have either descended from this first Semitic alphabet, or have been inspired by one of its descendants by stimulus diffusion, with the possible exception of the Meroitic alphabet, a 3rd-century BC adaptation of hieroglyphs in Nubia to the south of Egypt. The rongorongo script of Easter Island may also be an independently invented alphabet, but too little is known of it to be certain.

== Consonantal alphabets ==
=== Semitic alphabets ===
The Proto-Sinaitic script was invented by a community of laborers in the Sinai Peninsula in the 2nd millennium BC, and was used to write their native languages. It has not been fully deciphered. The oldest examples are found as graffiti in the Wadi el-Hol and date to c. 1850 BC. The letters denoted consonant sounds only: since meaning in semitic words is mainly expressed by their consonants, letters for vowels were unnecessary. The table below shows hypothesized prototypes of the Phoenician alphabet in Egyptian hieroglyphs, though several possibilities have been proposed.

The hieroglyphs may have been assigned phonetic values by the acrophonic principle: each letter denoted the first sound of the Semitic word for the object denoted. For example, the Egyptian hieroglyph per (a sketch of 4 walls and a doorway) meant 'house', which translated to Semitic bayt 'house': hence per was used to write the sound [b], becoming the progenitor of our letter B.

Egyptian prototype	F1	O1	T14	O31	A28	T3	Z4	O6	F35	D42	D46
Phoenician											
Acrophony	ʾalp 'ox'	bet 'house'	gaml 'thrown hunting club'	digg 'fish' or 'door'	haw, hillul 'jubilation'	waw 'hook'	zen, ziqq 'handcuff'	ḥet 'courtyard' or 'fence'	ṭēt 'wheel'	yad 'arm'	kap 'hand'

Egyptian prototype	S39	N35	I10	R11	D4	D21	M22	V24	D1	T9A	Z9
Phoenician											
Acrophony	lamd 'goad'	mem 'water'	nun 'large fish' or 'snake'	samekh 'support' or 'pillar'	ʿen 'eye'	piʾt 'bend'	ṣad 'plant'	qup 'monkey' or 'cord of wool'	raʾs 'head'	šananuma 'bow'	taw 'signature'

Little of this script has survived, but existing evidence suggests it retained its pictographic nature for half a millennium until scripts like it but not necessarily directly entirely descended from it were adopted for governmental use in Canaan. The first Canaanite city-states to make extensive use of the alphabet were the Phoenician city-states. The Phoenician cities were maritime states at the center of a vast trade network which spread their alphabet throughout the Mediterranean. Two subsequent variants had major historical impact: the Aramaic alphabet and the Greek alphabet. The first city-state directly known to have made systematic and large-scale use of any alphabet was Ugarit in present-day Syria.

=== Descendants of the Aramaic abjad ===
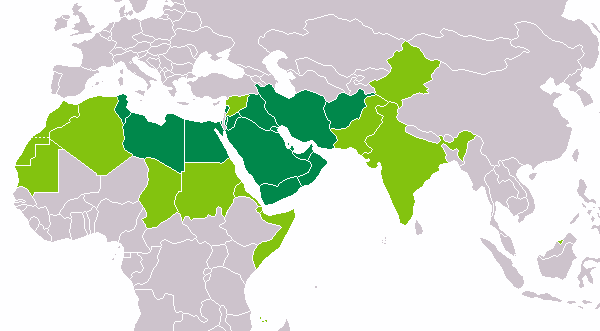
Global distribution of the Arabic alphabet. The dark green areas shows the countries where this alphabet is the sole main script. The light green shows the countries where the alphabet co-exists with other scripts.

The Phoenician and Aramaic alphabets, like their Egyptian prototype, represented only consonants, a system called an abjad. The Aramaic alphabet, which evolved from the Phoenician in the 8th century BC, to become the official script of the Assyrian, Babylonian, and Achaemenid Empires, appears to be the ancestor of nearly all the modern alphabets of Asia:

- The Arabic alphabet descended from Aramaic via the Nabataean alphabet of what is now southern Jordan. It is the second-most widely used alphabetic script in the world (after Latin) and the most used abjad system.
- The modern Hebrew alphabet started out as a local variant of Imperial Aramaic. The original Hebrew alphabet has been retained by the Samaritans.
- The Syriac alphabet used after the 3rd century AD evolved, through the Pahlavi scripts and Sogdian alphabet, into the alphabets of North Asia such as the Old Turkic alphabet, the Old Uyghur alphabet, the Mongolian writing systems, and the Manchu alphabet.
- The Georgian scripts appear to be part of either the Persian-Aramaic or Greek family.
- The Kharosthi and Brahmic scripts are descended from the Aramaic script, after the Achaemenid invasion of the Indus Valley in the 6th century BC.

== Alphabets with vowels ==
=== Greek alphabet ===
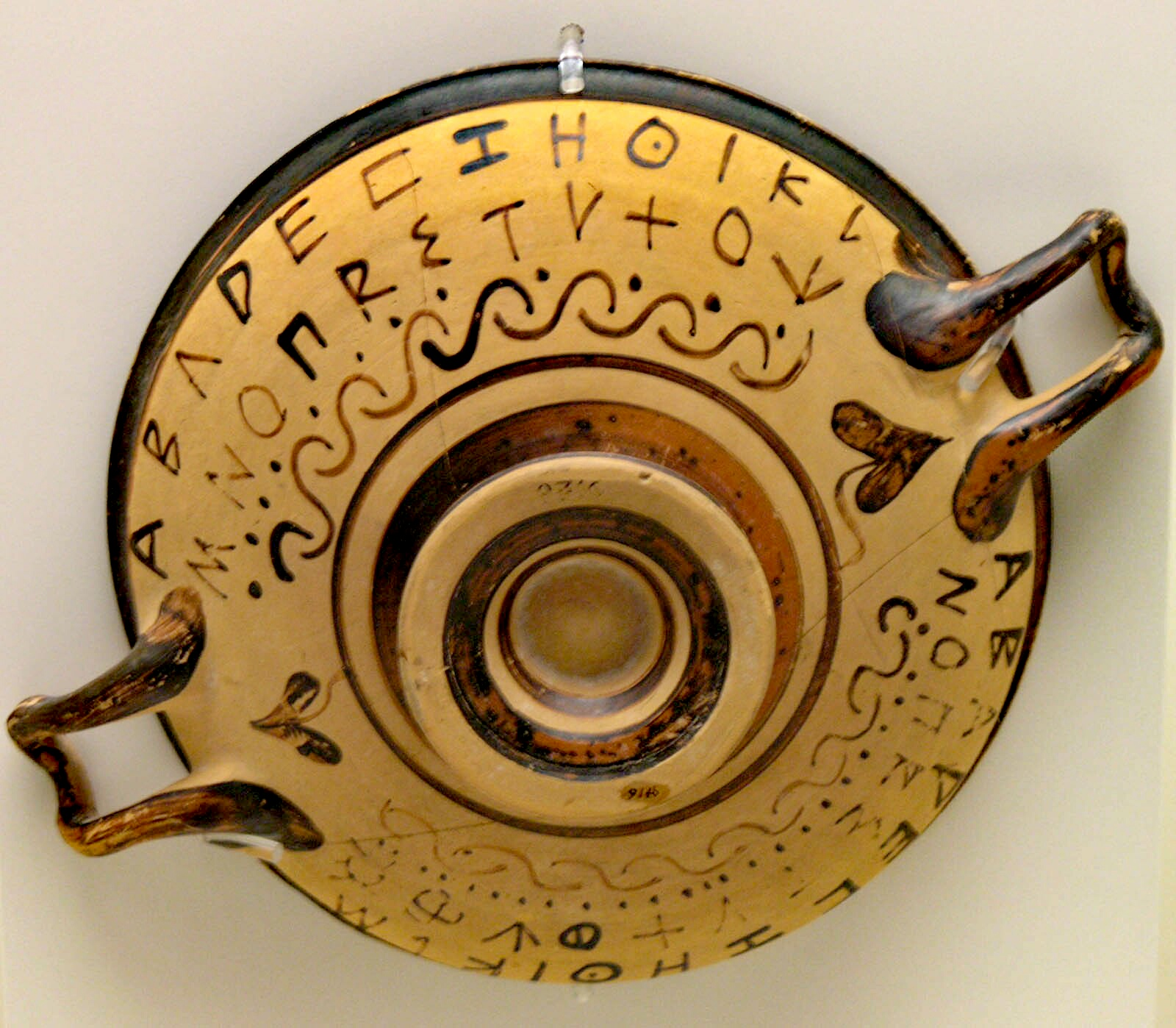
Greek alphabet on ancient black-figure pottery. There is a digamma but no ksi or omega. The letter phi upright in the photograph is missing a stroke and looks like the omicron Ο, but on the other side of the bottom it is a full Φ.

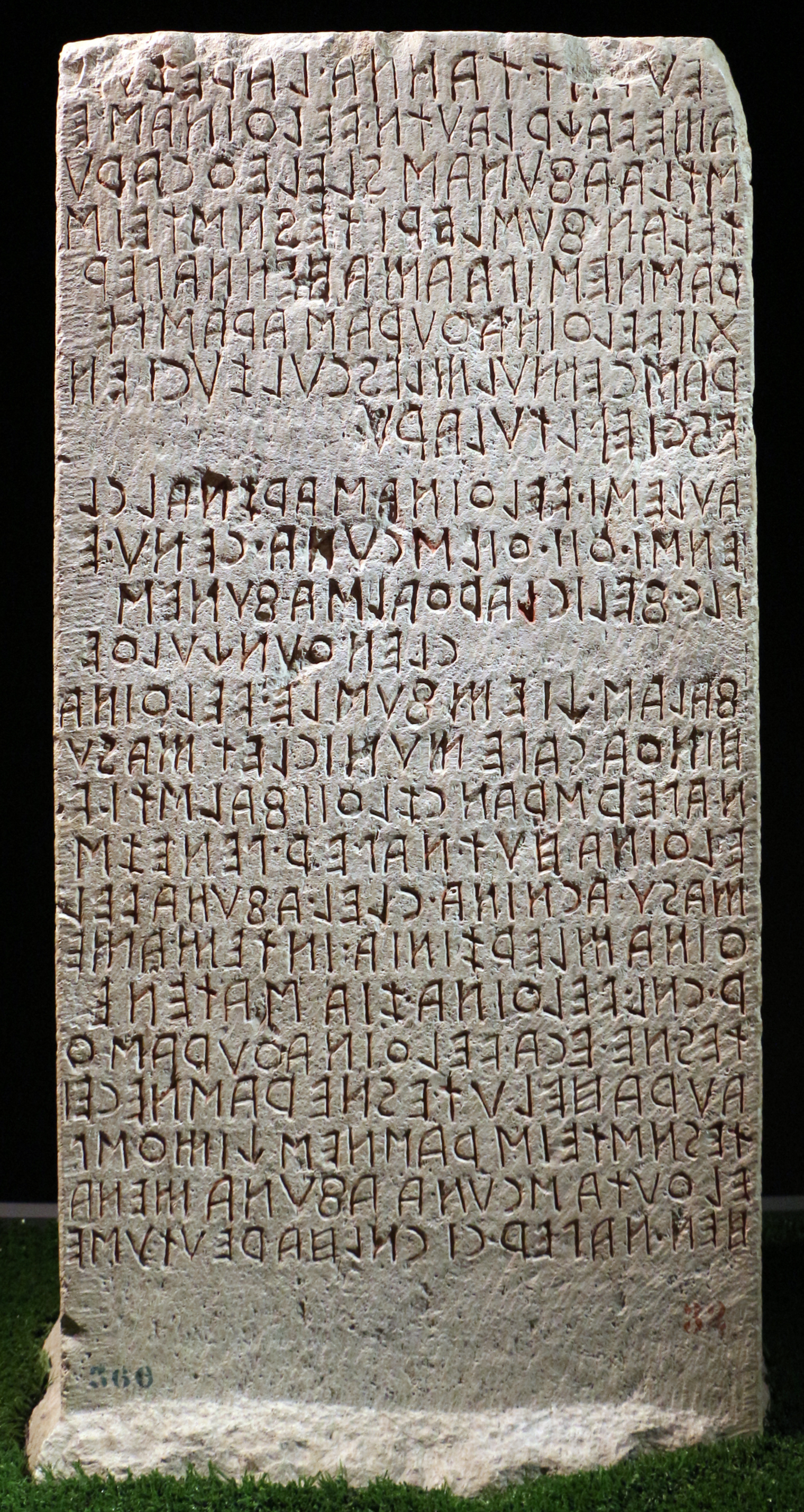
Etruscan writing, the beginning of the writing with the Latin alphabet

By the 8th century BC, the Greeks, also maritime traders, adapted the Phoenician alphabet to their own language, creating the first "true" alphabet in which vowels were accorded equal status with consonants. According to Greek legends transmitted by Herodotus, the alphabet was brought from Phoenicia to Greece by Cadmus.

The Greek alphabet contains the same letters in the same order as the Phoenician alphabet, but with different sound values. Though letters for vowels were not needed in semitic languages, their absence would create confusion in Greek, where vowels play a much larger semantic role. Hence some of the Phoenician letters representing consonants not present in Greek were re-purposed to write Greek vowel sounds. These letters had acrophonic Phoenician names unpronouceable in Greek; these initial consonants were dropped from the names, leaving initial vowels which became their sound values in the Greek alphabet. For example, Greek had no glottal stop or voiced pharyngeal sounds, so the Phoenician letters ’alep and `ayin became Greek alpha and o (later renamed omicron), standing for vowel sounds /a/ and /o/ rather than consonants /ʔ/ and /ʕ/. As this fortunate development only provided for five or six (depending on dialect) of the twelve Greek vowels, the Greeks eventually created digraphs and other modifications, such as ei, ou, and o—which became omega—or in some cases simply ignored the deficiency, as in long a, i, u.

Several varieties of the Greek alphabet developed. The Cumae alphabet was used west of Athens and in southern Italy, while the Eastern Greek alphabet was used in Asia Minor. The Athenians (c. 400 BC) adopted the Eastern variation, and eventually the rest of the Greek-speaking world followed. The Greeks first wrote right-to-left like the Phoenicians, then after a period including boustrophedon writing, they settled on left-to-right. This switch led to many Greek letters being mirror images of their Phoenician models.

Global distribution of the Cyrillic alphabet. The dark green areas shows the countries where this alphabet is the sole main script. The light green shows the countries where the alphabet co-exists with other scripts.

Greek is in turn the source of all the modern scripts of Europe. The alphabet of the early western Greek dialects, where the letter eta remained /h/, gave rise to the Old Italic alphabet which in turn developed into the Old Roman alphabet. In the eastern Greek dialects, which did not have the /h/ sound, eta stood for a vowel, and remains a vowel in modern Greek and all other alphabets derived from the eastern variants: Glagolitic, Cyrillic, Armenian, Gothic—which used both Greek and Roman letters—and perhaps Georgian.

This linear narrative simplifies a complex evolution. For example, Georgian scripts derive from the Semitic family, but were also strongly influenced by Greek. A modified version of the Greek alphabet, using an additional half-dozen Demotic hieroglyphs, was used to write Coptic Egyptian. In North America, the Cree syllabics are an abugida combining Devanagari and Pitman shorthand developed by the missionary James Evans.

=== Latin alphabet ===
Global distribution of the Latin alphabet. The dark green areas show the countries where this alphabet is the sole main script. The light green shows the countries where the alphabet co-exists with other scripts.

The Latin tribes, who became the Romans, shared the Italian peninsula with the Western Greeks. From the Etruscans, a tribe living in the first millennium BC in central Italy, and the Western Greeks, the Latins adopted writing in about the 7th century BC. Latin dropped four characters from the Western Greek alphabet. It also adapted the Etruscan letter F pronounced /w/, used in Latin for the /f/ sound; and the Etruscan S, written with three zigzag lines, was curved to make the modern S. Latin originally used gamma to represent the /g/ sound in Greek and the /k/ sound in Etruscan. This produced the modern alphabet without the letters G, J, U, W, Y, and Z, as well as some other differences.

C, K, and Q in the Roman alphabet could all be used to write both /ɡ/ and /k/ sounds; but Latin soon modified C to create G, inserted as the seventh letter in place of Z, to maintain the gematria (the numerical sequence of the alphabet). Over the few centuries after Alexander the Great conquered the Eastern Mediterranean and other areas in the 3rd century BC, Latin began to borrow Greek words, and had to adapt its alphabet again to write these words. From the Eastern Greek alphabet, it borrowed Y and Z, which were added as supplements to the end of the alphabet, used only for Greek words.

The Anglo-Saxons began writing Old English using the Latin alphabet following its introduction during Augustine of Canterbury's Christian mission to Britain in the 6th century. The /w/ sound was originally written with the rune wen, but this could easily be mistaken for a narrow p, and was replaced by double VV. The letter V was originally used for both consonant /v/ and vowel /u/, before the latter became differentiated as U, and the related letters U, V, W were placed consecutively in the alphabet. The letter J to write /j/ (written as Y in modern English) began as a variation of I, at first as the second letter of double II; general use of J for the consonant and I for the vowel was widespread by the 15th century and fully accepted in the mid-17th century.

== Letter names and order ==
The order and number of letters in the Proto-Sinaitic alphabet is unknown. The first attestation of any alphabetical order is from the 14th century BC in the town of Ugarit on Syria's northern coast. Tablets found there bear over one thousand distinct words in the Ugaritic alphabet, composed of thirty cuneiform characters. About twelve tablets have the signs set out in alphabetic order. There are two orders found, one nearly identical to the order used for Phoenician, Hebrew, Greek and Latin, and a second very similar to that used for Geʽez. Ugaritic preserved both orders. Both sequences proved remarkably stable among the descendants of these scripts.

The letter names proved stable among the many descendants of the Phoenician alphabet, including the Samaritan, Aramaic, Syriac, Arabic, Hebrew, and Greek alphabets. However, they were largely abandoned in Tifinagh, Latin and Cyrillic. The letter sequence continued more or less intact into Latin, Armenian, Gothic, and Cyrillic, but was abandoned in Brahmi, runes, and Arabic, although a traditional abjadi order remains or was reintroduced as an alternative in the latter.

Below is an approximate comparison of the scripts mentioned so far.

No.	Reconstruction	IPA	Value	Proto-Sinaitic	Proto-Canaanite	Ugaritic	Old Arabian	Phoenician	Imperial Aramaic	Hebrew	Arabic	Greek	Latin	Cyrillic	Runic
1	ʾalp 'ox'	/ʔ/	1	Aleph		𐎀	𐪑/𐩱 ʾālep	𐤀 ʾālep	𐡀 'ālap̱	א ʾālef	ﺍ ʾalif	Α alpha	A	А azŭ	ᚨ *ansuz
2	bayt 'house'	/b/	2	Bet		𐎁	𐪈/𐩨 bēt	𐤁 bēt	𐡁 bēṯ	ב bēṯ	ﺏ bāʾ	Β bēta	B	В vĕdĕ, Б buky	ᛒ *berkanan
3	gaml 'throwstick'	/ɡ/	3	Gimel		𐎂	𐪔/𐩴 gīmel	𐤂 gīmel	gāmal	ג gīmel	ﺝ jīm	Γ gamma	C, G	Г glagoli	ᚲ *kaunan
4	dalt 'door'	/d/	4	Dalet		𐎄	𐪕/𐩵 dālet	𐤃 dālet	𐡃 dālaṯ	ד dāleṯ	ﺩ dāl, ذ ḏāl	Δ delta	D	Д dobro	(ᚦ *Þurisaz)
4	dag 'fish'	/d/	—N/a	Dalet	—N/a	𐎄	𐪏/𐩯 samēk	—N/a	—N/a	—N/a	—N/a	—N/a	—N/a	—N/a	—N/a
5	haw 'window' / hillul 'jubilation'	/h/	5	Heh		𐎅	𐪀/𐩠 hē	𐤄 hē	𐡄 hē	ה hē	ه hāʾ	Ε epsilon	E	Е ye, Є estĭ	(ᛖ *ehwaz)
6	wāw 'hook'	/w/	6	Waw		𐎆	𐪅/𐩥 wāw	𐤅 wāw	𐡅 waw	ו vāv	و wāw	Ϝ digamma, Υ upsilon	F, U, V, W, Y	Оу / Ꙋ ukŭ → У	ᚠ *fehu, ᚢ *ûruz/*ûran
7	ziq 'manacle'	/z/	—N/a	—N/a	Ziqq	—N/a	𐪘/𐩸 zayn	—N/a	—N/a	—N/a	—N/a	—N/a	—N/a	—N/a	—N/a
8	zayn 'weapon' / dayp 'eyebrow'	/z/ or /ð/	7	Zayin	—N/a	𐎇	𐪙/𐩹 ḏālet	𐤆 zayin	𐡆 zayn	ז zayin	ز zayn or zāy	Ζ zēta	Z	Ꙁ / З zemlya	ᛇ *īhaz/*īwaz, (Maybe: ᛉ *algiz?)
8	zayn 'weapon' / dayp 'eyebrow'	/z/ or /ð/	7	Zayin	—N/a	𐎇	𐪙/𐩹 ḏālet	𐤆 zayin	(𐡃 dalaṯ)	ז zayin	(ذ ḏāl)	Ζ zēta	Z	Ꙁ / З zemlya	ᛇ *īhaz/*īwaz, (Maybe: ᛉ *algiz?)
9	ḥaṣir 'mansion'	/ħ/	8	Ḥet		𐎈	𐪂/𐩢 ḥēt	𐤇 ḥēt	𐡇 ḥēṯ	ח ḥēṯ	ح ḥāʾ, خ ḫāʾ	Η ēta	H	И iže	ᚺ *haglaz
10	ḫayt 'thread'	/x/	—N/a	𓎛	—N/a	𐎃	𐪍/𐩭 ḫēt	—N/a	(𐡇 ḥēṯ)	(ח ḥēṯ)	(خ ḫāʾ)	—N/a	—N/a	—N/a	—N/a
11	ṭab 'good'	/tˤ/	9	(Note: The Canaanites seem to have replaced the 𓄤 glyph with one resembling a spinning wheel (ṭayt) 𓊖.)		𐎉	(𐪗/𐩷 ṭēt)	(𐤈 ṭēt)	(𐡈 ṭeṯ)	(ט ṭēṯ)	(ط ṭāʾ, ظ ẓāʾ)	(Θ thēta)	—N/a	(Ѳ fita)	(ᛞ *dagaz)
12	yad 'hand'	/j/	10	Yad		𐎊	𐪚/𐩺 yōd	𐤉 yōd	𐡉 yoḏ	י yōḏ	ي yāʾ	Ι iota	I, J	І ižei	ᛁ *isaz
13	kap 'palm'	/k/	20	Khof		𐎋	𐪋/𐩫 kaf	𐤊 kap	𐡊 kāp̱	כ ך kāf	ك kāf	Κ kappa	K	К kako	(Maybe: ᛜ *ingwaz)
14	lamd 'goad'	/l/	30	Lamed		𐎍	𐪁/𐩡 lāmed	𐤋 lāmed	𐡋 lāmaḏ	ל lāmeḏ	ل lām	Λ lambda	L	Л lyudiye	ᛚ *laguz/*laukaz
15	Maym 'waters'	/m/	40	Mem		𐎎	𐪃/𐩣 mēm	𐤌 mēm	𐡌 mim	מ ם mēm	م mīm	Μ mu	M	М myslite	ᛗ *mannaz
16	naḥš 'snake'	/n/	50	Nun		𐎐	𐪌/𐩬 nun	𐤍 nun	𐡍 nun	נ ן nun	ن nūn	Ν nu	N	Н našĭ	(ᚾ *naudiz)
17	samk 'support'	/s/	60	—N/a		𐎒	—N/a	𐤎 sāmek	𐡎 semkaṯ	ס sāmeḵ	—N/a	Ξ ksi, (Χ chi)	(X)	Ѯ ksi, (Х xĕrŭ)	(ᚷ *gebô, Maybe: ᛃ *jēra-)
18	ʿayn 'eye'	/ʕ/	70	Ayin	𐤏	𐎓	𐪒/𐩲 ʿayn	𐤏 ʿayin	𐡏 ʿayn	ע ʿayin	ع ʿayn	Ο o mikron, Ω ō mega	O	О onŭ	ᛟ *ōþalą
19	ġayn ?	/ɣ/	—N/a	—N/a	—N/a	𐎙	𐪖/𐩶 ġayn	—N/a	𐡏 ʿayn	(ע ʿayin)	(غ ġayn)	—N/a	—N/a	—N/a	—N/a
20	pay 'mouth' / piʾt 'corner'	/p/	80			𐎔	𐪐/𐩰 fē	𐤐 pē	𐡐 pē	פ ף pē	ف fāʾ	Π pi	P	П pokoi	(ᛈ *perþō?)
21	ṣad 'plant'	/sˤ/	90			𐎕	𐪎/𐩮 ṣāḏē	𐤑 ṣādē	𐡑 ṣāḏē	צ ץ ṣāḏi	ص ṣād,	Ϻ san, (Ϡ sampi)	—N/a	Ц tsi, Ч črvĭ	(Maybe: ᛉ *algiz?)
22	(ẓeth) ?	/θˤ/	—N/a	—N/a	—N/a	—N/a	𐪜/𐩼 ẓet	—N/a	(𐡈 ṭeṯ)	—N/a	(ظ ẓāʾ)	Ϻ san, (Ϡ sampi)	—N/a	Ц tsi, Ч črvĭ	
23	(ḍaḏe) ?	/ɬˤ/	—N/a	—N/a	—N/a	—N/a	𐪓/𐩳 ḍāḏē	—N/a	(𐡏 ʿayn)	—N/a	(ض ḍād)	Ϻ san, (Ϡ sampi)	—N/a	Ц tsi, Ч črvĭ	
24	qup 'monkey'/ qaw 'cord', 'line'	/kˤ/ or /q/	100	Qoph		𐎖	𐪄/𐩤 qōf	𐤒 qōp	𐡒 qop̱	ק qōf	ق qāf	Ϙ koppa	Q	Ҁ koppa	(ᚹ *wunjō)
25	raʾš 'head'	/r/ or /ɾ/	200	Resh		𐎗	𐪇/𐩧 rēš	𐤓 rēš	𐡓 rēš	ר rēš	ر rāʾ	Ρ rho	R	Р rĭtsi	ᚱ *raidô
26	śamš 'sun'	/ʃ/	—N/a		—N/a	𐎌	𐪊/𐩪 sat	—N/a	—N/a	—N/a	—N/a	—N/a	—N/a	—N/a	—N/a
27	?	/ɬ/	—N/a	—N/a	? (Note: A | glyph for ś has been found in the Canaanite Lachish Comb inscription, though no such glyph has been found in Proto-Sinaitic, and its origin has not been discovered.)	𐎌	(𐪆/𐩦 šin)	—N/a	—N/a	(שׂ śin)	(ش šīn)	—N/a	—N/a	—N/a	—N/a
27	ṯad 'breast'	/θ/	300			𐎌	(𐪆/𐩦 šin)	—N/a	𐡔 šin	ש šin	س sīn,	Σ sigma, ϛ stigma	S	С slovo, Ш ša, Щ šta, Ꙃ / Ѕ dzĕlo	ᛊ *sowilô
27	ṯad 'breast'	/θ/	300			𐎌	𐪛/𐩻 ṯāw	𐤔 šin	𐡕 taw	ש šin	(ث ṯāʾ)	Σ sigma, ϛ stigma	S	С slovo, Ш ša, Щ šta, Ꙃ / Ѕ dzĕlo	ᛊ *sowilô
28	taw 'mark'	/t/	400	Tof		𐎚	𐪉/𐩩 tāw	𐤕 tāw	𐡕 taw	ת tāv	ت tāʾ, ث ṯāʾ	Τ tau	T	Т tvrdo	ᛏ *tîwaz

These 26 consonants account for the phonology of Northwest Semitic. Of the 29 consonant phonemes commonly reconstructed for Proto-Semitic, the voiceless fricatives ś, ṣ́, and ṯ̣ are missing. The phonemes ḏ, ṯ, ḫ, ġ disappeared in Canaanite, merging with z, š, ḥ, ʿ in Canaanite scripts, respectively. The six variant letters added in the Arabic alphabet include these (except for ś, which survives as a separate phoneme in Geʽez ሠ):

- ḏ → ḏāl
- ṯ → ṯāʾ
- ṱ → ẓāʾ
- ġ → ġayn
- ṣ́ → ḍād
- ḫ → ḫāʾ

== Graphically independent alphabets ==
One modern national alphabet that has not been graphically traced back to the Canaanite alphabet is the Maldivian script, which is unique in that, although it is clearly modeled after Arabic and perhaps other existing alphabets, it derives its letter forms from numerals. Others are the hangul alphabet used to write Korean, which was created in 1443; and Ogham, used for Primitive Irish inscriptions in the 3rd to 8th centuries AD.

== Alphabets in other media ==
Changes to a new writing medium sometimes caused a break in graphical form, or make the relationship difficult to trace. It is not immediately obvious that the cuneiform Ugaritic alphabet derives from a prototypical Semitic abjad, for example, although this appears to be the case. And while manual alphabets are a direct continuation of the local written alphabet (both the British two-handed and the French/American one-handed alphabets retain the forms of the Latin alphabet, as the Indian manual alphabet does Devanagari, and the Korean does Hangul), Braille, semaphore, maritime signal flags, and the Morse codes are essentially arbitrary geometric forms. The shapes of the English Braille and semaphore letters are not derived from the graphic forms of the letters themselves. Most modern forms of shorthand are also unrelated to the alphabet, generally transcribing sounds instead of letters.

== See also ==
- List of creators of writing systems
- List of languages by first written accounts
