= Michael G. Hasel =

American Biblical archaeologist

Michael G. Hasel is an American biblical archaeologist and scholar of Near Eastern studies. He is Professor of Near Eastern Studies and Archaeology, Director of the Institute of Archaeology, and Curator of the Lynn H. Wood Archaeological Museum at Southern Adventist University in Tennessee, U.S. Hasel has over 30 years of field experience and has co‑directed excavations at Khirbet Qeiyafa, Socoh, and Tel Lachish in Israel. His team discovered the Khirbet Qeiyafa ostracon and Lachish's Canaanite ivory comb.

== Early life and education ==
Hasel earned his M.A. and Ph.D. from the University of Arizona in Near Eastern Studies and Anthropology. He joined Southern Adventist University in 1998 and has held fellowships including the Samuel H. Kress Fellowship, Fulbright Scholar, and the National Endowment for the Humanities Fellowship at the W.F. Albright Institute of Archaeological Research in Jerusalem.

== Career ==
Since 1998, Hasel has taught archaeology and biblical studies at Southern Adventist University. He has excavated at eleven to twelve sites across Israel, Jordan, and Cyprus. He currently serves as co‑director of the Fourth Expedition to Tel Lachish and has co‑directed the Khirbet Qeiyafa Archaeological Project.

== Excavations and discoveries ==
=== Khirbet Qeiyafa ===
Hasel co‑directed excavations at Khirbet Qeiyafa beginning in the 2008 seasons, alongside Yosef Garfinkel and Saar Ganor. The site, dated to early Iron Age IIA (circa 1000–975 BCE), measures about 2.3 hectares and features a casemate‑style double city wall, two gates, and an organized city plan interpreted as Judean administration in the time of David or early monarchy.

A key find was the Khirbet Qeiyafa ostracon, discovered in 2008—a potsherd inscribed with five lines of Proto-Canaanite script, carbon‑dated to around 1000 BCE. The inscription may represent one of the earliest examples of Hebrew or Northwest Semitic writing, containing possible references to “judge,” “slave,” “widow,” and “king.” Interpretations vary but it is widely considered significant to studies of early literacy and disucssios of the historicity of the United Monarchy.

=== Tel Lachish ===
In 2013 Hasel joined the team initiating renewed excavations at Tel Lachish, co‑directed with Yosef Garfinkel and Martin Klingbeil under the institutes of Hebrew University and Southern Adventist University. Excavations focused on the northeastern corner of the site, revealing major finds: a scarab, ostraca from the Late Bronze Age, a gate shrine destroyed in the Assyrian assault, and even a toilet installation suggesting iconoclastic activity. These discoveries contribute to understanding Lachish’s Iron Age and Judean administrative features.

In 2021 Hasel and his team published the 3,700‑year‑old Canaanite ivory comb, discovered in 2016. Made from elephant ivory and measuring about 3.5 × 1.5 cm, the comb bears the earliest known complete sentence inscribed in a phonetic alphabet (a form of early Canaanite script): “May this tusk root out the lice of the hair and the beard”. Although excavated earlier, the inscription was only identified in 2021 and offers insights into personal hygiene, early literacy, and daily life in the Bronze Age Canaanite society.

== Bibliography ==
- Hasel, Michael G. (1998). Domination and Resistance: Egyptian Military Activity in the Southern Levant, 1300-1185 B.C. Brill. ISBN 9789004109841.
- Hasel, Michael G. (2005). Military Practice and Polemic: Israel's Laws of Warfare in Near Eastern Perspective. Andrews University Press. ISBN 9781883925475.
