= Assen (disambiguation) =

Assen is a municipality and a city in the Netherlands. It can also refer to:

== Surname ==
- Jan van Assen (1635–1695), Dutch Golden Age painter
- Miguel van Assen (born 1997), Surinamese athlete

== Given name ==
- Assen Blatechki (born 1971), Bulgarian actor
- Assen Bossev (1913–1997), Bulgarian author
- Assen Hartenau (1890–1965), Austrian civil servant
- Assen Jordanoff (1896–1967), Bulgarian inventor
- Assen Najdenow (1899–1995), Bulgarian conductor
- Assen Pandov (born 1984), Bulgarian short-track speed skater
- Assen Razcvetnikov (1897–1951), Bulgarian poet
- Assen Vassilev (born 1977), Bulgarian politician and economist

== See also ==
- Asen (disambiguation)
- Asse (disambiguation)
- Assens (disambiguation)
