= Azen =

Azen may refer to:

- Azen, Missouri, United States
- Azen, Washington County, Virginia, United States
- Azen Gushnasp, Iranian statesman
- Ben-Azen (fl. ca. 1200 BC), Egyptian official

== See also ==
- Asen (disambiguation)
