= Åsen (disambiguation) =

Åsen may refer to:

== People ==
- Gjermund Åsen (born 1991), a Norwegian footballer who plays for Tromsø

== Places ==
- Åsen, a village in Levanger Municipality in Trøndelag county, Norway
- Åsen Municipality, a former municipality (1838-1962) in the old Nord-Trøndelag county, Norway
- Åsen Station, a railway station located in the village of Åsen in Levanger municipality in Trøndelag county, Norway
- Åsen Church, a church located in the village of Åsen in Levanger municipality in Trøndelag county, Norway
- Åsen, Oslo, a neighborhood divided between the boroughs of Sagene and Nordre Aker in Oslo, Norway
- Åsen, Sweden, a village in Älvdalen Municipality in Dalarna county, Sweden

== See also ==
- Aasen (disambiguation), an alternate (older) spelling of Åsen
- Asen (disambiguation), a similar spelling to Åsen
