= Asen =

Asen may refer to:

== Places ==
- Asen (state), a polity involved in late 17th-century wars in modern Ghana
- Asen, Stara Zagora Province, a village in Pavel Banya Municipality, Bulgaria

== Other ==
- Asen dynasty, a dynasty which ruled the Second Bulgarian Empire between 1187 and 1280
- Asen (vodun), metal objects that attract the spirits of the dead associated with West African Vodun (voodoo)
- Asen, Asena or Ashina, the ruling dynasty of the ancient Turks in mid 6th century
- "Asen", an archaic unit of measurement (also aasen, aces), used to value tulips, during the tulip mania
- Jaime Asensio de la Fuente (b. 1978), Spanish footballer known as Asen
- Asen (ship), a training ship of the Bulgarian navy; see List of Bulgarian military equipment of World War II

== Acronym ==
- Association for the Study of Ethnicity and Nationalism
- Australian Student Environment Network

== See also ==
- Åsen (disambiguation)
- Aasen (disambiguation)
- Assen (disambiguation)
- Azen (disambiguation)
