= Asse (disambiguation) =

Asse is a town in Belgium. It may also refer to:

- Marquess of Assche
  - Theodore van der Noot, 8th Marquess of Assche
  - Elisabeth, Countess van der Noot, Countess of Assche
- Asse (hills), a chain of hills in Lower Saxony, Germany
- Asse (Samtgemeinde), a municipal federation in Lower Saxony, Germany
- Asse (river), a river in southeastern France
- Asse Chocolate, Japanese chocolate made by Morinaga & Company, named after the Belgian town
- Asse, an alternate name for the Cape fox
- Schacht Asse II, a repository for radioactive waste in Asse, Germany
- Geneviève Asse (1923–2021), French painter

The acronym ASSE may refer to:

- Asse, Administración de los Servicios de Salud del Estado, health care provider in Uruguay
- AS Saint-Étienne, a French football club
- American Society of Safety Engineers
- ASSÉ, Association pour une solidarité syndicale étudiante, a student union in Quebec, Canada

== See also ==
- Assen (disambiguation)
- Assens (disambiguation)
