= Phoenician language =

Ancient Semitic language of the Mediterranean, specifically present-day Lebanon

Phoenician
- Native to: Canaan, Lebanon, North Africa, Cyprus, Iberia, Sicily, Malta and Sardinia
- Era: attested in Canaan proper from the mid-11th century BC to the 2nd century BC
- Language family: Afro-Asiatic: Semitic; West Semitic; Central Semitic; Northwest Semitic; Canaanite; North; Phoenician
- Dialects: Byblian; Tyro-Sidonian • Eastern • Western • Punic
- Writing system: Phoenician alphabet

Language codes
- ISO 639-2: phn
- ISO 639-3: phn
- Glottolog: phoe1239 Phoenician phoe1238 Phoenician–Punic

Phoenician (/fəˈniːʃən/ fə-NEE-shən; Phoenician: śpt knʿn 𐤔𐤐𐤕𐤟𐤊𐤍𐤏𐤍 lit. 'language of Canaan') is an extinct Canaanite language of the Semitic language family originally spoken by the Phoenicians. Extensive Tyro-Sidonian trade and commercial dominance led to Phoenician becoming a lingua franca of the maritime Mediterranean during the Iron Age. The Phoenician alphabet spread to Greece during this period, where it became the source of all modern European scripts.

Phoenician belongs to the Canaanite languages subgroup of the Northwest Semitic division, and as such is similar and mutually intelligible with Biblical Hebrew and other languages of the subgroup.

The area in which Phoenician was spoken, which the Phoenicians called Pūt, includes the northern Levant, specifically the areas now including Lebanon, the Western Galilee, parts of Cyprus, some parts of Syria, some adjacent areas of Anatolia, and, at least as a prestige language, the rest of Anatolia. Phoenician was also spoken in the Phoenician colonies along the coasts of the southwestern Mediterranean Sea, including those of modern Tunisia, Morocco, Libya and Algeria as well as Malta, the west of Sicily, southwest Sardinia, the Balearic Islands and southernmost Spain. It developed into the Punic language in North Africa.

In modern times, the language was first decoded by Jean-Jacques Barthélemy in 1758, who noted that the name "Phoenician" was first given to the language by Samuel Bochart in his Geographia Sacra seu Phaleg et Canaan.

== History ==
The Phoenicians were the first state-level society to make extensive use of the Semitic alphabet. The Phoenician alphabet is one of the oldest verified consonantal alphabets, or abjad. It has become conventional to refer to the script as "Proto-Canaanite" until the mid-11th century BC, when it is first attested on inscribed bronze arrowheads, and as "Phoenician" only after 1050 BC. The Phoenician phonetic alphabet is generally believed to be at least the partial ancestor of almost all modern alphabets.

The most important Phoenician trade routes and cities in the Mediterranean Basin

From a traditional linguistic perspective, Phoenician was composed of a variety of dialects. According to some sources, Phoenician developed into distinct Tyro-Sidonian and Byblian dialects. By this account, the Tyro-Sidonian dialect, from which the Punic language eventually emerged, spread across the Mediterranean through trade and colonisation, whereas the ancient dialect of Byblos, known from a corpus of only a few dozen extant inscriptions, played no expansionary role. However, the very slight differences in language and the insufficient records of the time make it unclear whether Phoenician formed a separate and united dialect or was merely a superficially defined part of a broader language continuum. Through their maritime trade, the Phoenicians spread the use of the alphabet to the Maghreb and Europe, where it was adopted by the Greeks. Later, the Etruscans adopted a modified version for their own use, which, in turn, was modified and adopted by the Romans and became the Latin alphabet. In the east of the Mediterranean region, the language was in use as late as the 1st century BC, when it seems to have gone extinct there.

Punic colonisation spread Phoenician to the western Mediterranean, where the distinct Punic language developed. Punic also died out, but it seems to have survived far longer than Phoenician, until the sixth century, perhaps even into the ninth century.

== Writing system ==
Phoenician was written with the Phoenician script, an abjad (consonantary) originating from the Proto-Canaanite alphabet that also became the basis for the Greek alphabet and, via an Etruscan adaptation, the Latin alphabet. The Punic form of the script gradually developed somewhat different and more cursive letter shapes; in the 3rd century BC, it also began to exhibit a tendency to mark the presence of vowels, especially final vowels, with an aleph or sometimes an ayin. Furthermore, around the time of the Second Punic War, an even more cursive form began to develop, which gave rise to a variety referred to as Neo-Punic and existed alongside the more conservative form and became predominant some time after the destruction of Carthage (c. 149 BC). Neo-Punic, in turn, tended to designate vowels with matres lectionis ("consonantal letters") more frequently than the previous systems had and also began to systematically use different letters for different vowels, in the way explained in more detail below. Finally, a number of late inscriptions from what is now Constantine, Algeria dated to the first century BC make use of the Greek alphabet to write Punic, and many inscriptions from Tripolitania, in the third and fourth centuries AD use the Latin alphabet for that purpose.

In Phoenician writing, unlike that of abjads such as those of Aramaic, Biblical Hebrew and Arabic, even long vowels remained generally unexpressed, regardless of their origin (even if they originated from diphthongs, as in bt /beːt/ 'house', for earlier *bayt-; Hebrew spelling has byt). Eventually, Punic writers began to implement systems of marking of vowels by means of matres lectionis. In the 3rd century BC appeared the practice of using final 'ālep 𐤀 to mark the presence of any final vowel and, occasionally, of yōd 𐤉 to mark a final long [iː].

Later, mostly after the destruction of Carthage in the so-called "Neo-Punic" inscriptions, that was supplemented by a system in which wāw 𐤅 denoted [u], yōd 𐤉 denoted [i], 'ālep 𐤀 denoted [e] and [o], ʿayin 𐤏 denoted [a] and hē 𐤄 and ḥēt 𐤇 could also be used to signify [a]. This latter system was used first with foreign words and was then extended to many native words as well.

A third practice reported in the literature is the use of the consonantal letters for vowels in the same way as had occurred in the original adaptation of the Phoenician alphabet to Greek and Latin, which was apparently still transparent to Punic writers: hē 𐤄 for [e] and 'ālep 𐤀 for [a].

Later, Punic inscriptions began to be written in the Latin alphabet, which also indicated the vowels. Those later inscriptions, in addition with some inscriptions in Greek letters and transcriptions of Phoenician names into other languages, represent the main source of knowledge about Phoenician vowels.

== Phonology ==
=== Consonants ===
The following table presents the consonant phonemes of the Phoenician language as represented in the Phoenician alphabet, alongside their standard Semiticist transliteration and reconstructed phonetic values in the International Phonetic Alphabet:

Phoenician consonants (Traditional School)
Type		Bilabial	Alveolar		Palatal	Velar	Uvular	Pharyngeal	Glottal
Type		Bilabial	plain	emphatic (Note: As in other Semitic languages, the Phoenician “plain” voiceless obstruent series was aspirated, while the emphatic series was unaspirated. It is likely that the emphatic series was additionally marked by an indeterminate type of secondary articulation, represented here by the cover symbol ⟨^{◌}⟩. Phonetically, this may have taken the form of pharyngealization, as in Arabic and Aramaic, or glottalization, as in the Ethiopian Semitic languages.)	Palatal	Velar	Uvular	Pharyngeal	Glottal
Nasal		𐤌 m /m/	𐤍 n /n/						
Stop / Affricate	voiceless	𐤐 p /p/	𐤕 t /t/	𐤈 ṭ /t^{◌}/		𐤊 k /k/	𐤒 q /q/		𐤀 ʾ /ʔ/
Stop / Affricate	voiced	𐤁 b /b/	𐤃 d /d/			𐤂 g /ɡ/			
Fricative	voiceless		𐤎 s /s/	𐤑 ṣ /s^{◌}/	𐤔 š /ʃ/			𐤇 ḥ /ħ/	𐤄 h /h/
Fricative	voiced		𐤆 z /z/					𐤏 ʿ /ʕ/	
Trill / Tap			𐤓 r /r/						
Approximant			𐤋 l /l/		𐤉 j /j/	𐤅 w /w/			

The system reflected in the abjad above is the product of several mergers. From Proto-Northwest Semitic to Canaanite, *š and *ṯ have merged into *š, *ḏ and *z have merged into *z, and *ṯ̣, *ṣ́ and *ṣ have merged into *ṣ. Next, from Canaanite to Phoenician, the sibilants *ś and *š were merged as *š, *ḫ and *ḥ were merged as ḥ, and *ʕ and *ġ were merged as *ʕ. For the phonetic values of the sibilants, see below. These latter developments also occurred in Biblical Hebrew at one point or another, except that *ś merged into *s there.

==== Sibilants ====
The original value of the Proto-Semitic sibilants, and accordingly of their Phoenician counterparts, is disputed. While the traditional sound values are [ʃ] for š, [s] for s, [z] for z, and [sˤ] for ṣ, recent scholarship argues that š was [s], s was [ts], z was [dz], and ṣ was [tsʼ]. Krahmalkov, too, suggests that Phoenician *z may have been [dz] or even [zd] based on Latin transcriptions such as esde for the demonstrative 𐤆 z.

On the other hand, it is debated whether šīn 𐤔 and sāmek 𐤎, which are mostly well distinguished by the Phoenician orthography, also eventually merged at some point, either in Classical Phoenician or in Late Punic.

==== Postvelars ====
In later Punic, the laryngeals and pharyngeals seem to have been entirely lost. Neither these nor the emphatics could be adequately represented by the Latin alphabet, but there is also evidence to that effect from Punic script transcriptions.

==== Lenition ====
There is no consensus on whether Phoenician-Punic ever underwent the lenition of stop consonants that happened in most other Northwest Semitic languages such as Biblical Hebrew and Aramaic (cf. Hackett vs Segert and Lyavdansky). The consonant /p/ may have been generally transformed into /f/ in Punic and in late Phoenician, as it was in Proto-Arabic. Certainly, Latin-script renditions of late Punic include many spirantised transcriptions with ph, th and kh in various positions (although the interpretation of these spellings is not entirely clear) as well as the letter f for the original *p. However, in Neo-Punic, *b lenited to /v/ contiguous to a following consonant, as in the Latin transcription lifnim for 𐤋𐤁𐤍𐤌 *lbnm "for his son".

=== Vowels ===
Knowledge of the vowel system is very imperfect because of the characteristics of the writing system. During most of its existence, Phoenician writing showed no vowels at all, and even as vowel notation systems did eventually arise late in its history, they never came to be applied consistently to native vocabulary. It is thought that Phoenician had the short vowels /a/, /i/, /u/ and the long vowels /aː/, /iː/, /uː/, /eː/, /oː/. The Proto-Semitic diphthongs /aj/ and /aw/ are realised as /eː/ and /oː/. That must have happened earlier than in Biblical Hebrew since the resultant long vowels are not marked with the semivowel letters (bēt "house" was written 𐤁𐤕 bt, in contrast to Biblical Hebrew בית byt).

The most conspicuous vocalic development in Phoenician is the so-called Canaanite shift, shared by Biblical Hebrew, but going further in Phoenician. The Proto-Northwest Semitic /aː/ and /aw/ became not merely /oː/ as in Tiberian Hebrew, but /uː/. Stressed Proto-Semitic /a/ became Tiberian Hebrew /ɔː/ (/aː/ in other traditions), but Phoenician /oː/. The shift is proved by Latin and Greek transcriptions like rūs/ρους for "head, cape" 𐤓𐤀𐤔 /ruːʃ/ (Tiberian Hebrew rōš /roːʃ/, ראש); similarly notice stressed /o/ (corresponding to Tiberian Hebrew /a/) samō/σαμω for "he heard" 𐤔𐤌𐤏 /ʃaˈmoʕ/ (Tiberian Hebrew šāmaʻ /ʃɔːˈmaʕ/, שָׁמַע); similarly the word for "eternity" is known from Greek transcriptions to have been ūlōm/ουλομ 𐤏𐤋𐤌 /ʕuːˈloːm/, corresponding to Biblical Hebrew ʻōlām עולם /ʕoːlɔːm/ and Proto-Semitic ʻālam /ˈʕaːlam/ (in Arabic: ʻālam عالم /ˈʕaːlam/). The letter Y used for words such as 𐤀𐤔 /ʔəʃ/ ys/υς "which" and 𐤀𐤕 /ʔət/ yth/υθ (definite accusative marker) in Greek and Latin alphabet inscriptions can be interpreted as denoting a reduced schwa vowel that occurred in pre-stress syllables in verbs and two syllables before stress in nouns and adjectives, while other instances of Y as in chyl/χυλ and even chil/χιλ for 𐤊𐤋 /kull/ "all" in Poenulus can be interpreted as a further stage in the vowel shift resulting in fronting ([y]) and even subsequent delabialisation of /u/ and /uː/. Short /*i/ in originally-open syllables was lowered to [e] and was also lengthened if it was accented.

Possible vowel system in Phoenician
	Short		Long	
	Front	Back	Front	Back
Close	/i/	/u/	/iː/	/uː/
Mid	/i/	/u/	/eː/	/oː/
Open	/a/		/aː/	

=== Suprasegmentals ===
Stress-dependent vowel changes indicate that stress was probably mostly final, as in Biblical Hebrew. Long vowels probably occurred only in open syllables.

== Grammar ==
As is typical for the Semitic languages, Phoenician words are usually built around consonantal roots and vowel changes are used extensively to express morphological distinctions. However, unlike most Semitic languages, Phoenician preserved (or, possibly, re-introduced) numerous uniconsonantal and biconsonantal roots seen in Proto-Afro-Asiatic: compare the verbs 𐤊𐤍 kn "to be" vs Arabic كون kwn, 𐤌𐤕 mt "to die" vs Hebrew and Arabic מות/موت mwt.

=== Nominal morphology ===
Nouns are marked for gender (masculine and feminine), number (singular, plural and vestiges of the dual) and state (absolute and construct, the latter being nouns that are followed by their possessors) and also have the category definiteness. There is some evidence for remains of the Proto-Semitic genitive grammatical case as well. While many of the endings coalesce in the standard orthography, inscriptions in the Latin and Greek alphabet permit the reconstruction of the noun endings, which are also the adjective endings, as follows:

		Singular	Dual	Plural
Masculine	Absolute	∅	𐤌 m /-ēm/	𐤌 m /-īm/
Masculine	Construct	∅	∅ /-ē/	∅ /-ē/
Feminine	Absolute	𐤕 t /-(a/i/o)t/	𐤕𐤌 tm /-tēm/	𐤕 t /-ūt/
Feminine	Construct	𐤕 t /-(a/i/o)t/	𐤕𐤍 tn /-tēn/	𐤕 t /-ūt/

In late Punic, the final /-t/ of the feminine was apparently dropped: 𐤇𐤌𐤋𐤊𐤕 ḥmlkt "son of the queen" or 𐤀𐤇𐤌𐤋𐤊𐤕 ʼḥmlkt "brother of the queen" rendered in Latin as HIMILCO. /n/ was also assimilated to following consonants: e.g. 𐤔𐤕 št "year" for earlier 𐤔𐤍𐤕 */sant/.

The case endings in general must have been lost between the 9th century BC and the 7th century BC: the personal name rendered in Akkadian as ma-ti-nu-ba-ʼa-li "Gift of Baal", with the case endings -u and -i, was written ma-ta-an-baʼa-al (likely Phoenician spelling *𐤌𐤕𐤍𐤁𐤏𐤋) two centuries later. However, evidence has been found for a retention of the genitive case in the form of the first-singular possessive suffix: 𐤀𐤁𐤉 ʼby /ʼabiya/ "of my father" vs 𐤀𐤁 ʼb /ʼabī/ "my father". If true, this may suggest that cases were still distinguished to some degree in other forms as well.

The written forms and the reconstructed pronunciations of the personal pronouns are as follows:

Singular:
1st: /ʼanōkī/ 𐤀𐤍𐤊 ʼnk (Punic sometimes 𐤀𐤍𐤊𐤉 ʼnkj), also attested as /ʼanek/
2nd masc. /ʼatta(ː)/ 𐤀𐤕 ʼt
2nd fem. /ʼatti(ː)/ 𐤀𐤕 ʼt
3rd masc. /huʼa/ 𐤄𐤀 hʼ, also [hy] (?) 𐤄𐤉 hj and /huʼat/ 𐤄𐤀𐤕 hʼt
3rd fem. /hiʼa/ 𐤄𐤀 hʼ

Plural:
1st: /ʼanaḥnū/ 𐤀𐤍𐤇𐤍 ʼnḥn
2nd masc. /ʾattim/ 𐤀𐤕𐤌 ʼtm
2nd fem. unattested, perhaps /ʾattin/ 𐤀𐤕𐤍 ʼtn
3rd masc. and feminine /himūt/ 𐤄𐤌𐤕 hmt

Enclitic personal pronouns were added to nouns (to encode possession) and to prepositions, as shown below for "Standard Phoenician" (the predominant dialect, as distinct from the Byblian and the late Punic varieties). They appear in a slightly different form depending on whether or not they follow plural-form masculine nouns (and so are added after a vowel). The former is given in brackets with the abbreviation a.V.

Singular:
1st: /-ī/ ∅, also 𐤉 j (a.V. /-ajj/ j)
2nd masc. /-ka(ː)/ 𐤊 k
2nd fem. /-ki(ː)/ 𐤊 k
3rd masc. /-oː/ ∅, Punic 𐤀 ʼ, (a.V. /-ēju(ː)/ j)
3rd fem. /-aː/ ∅, Punic 𐤀 ʼ (a.V. /-ēja(ː)/ j)

Plural:
1st: /-on/ 𐤍 n
2nd masc. /-kum/ 𐤊𐤌 km
2nd fem. unattested, perhaps /-kin/ 𐤊𐤍 kn
3rd masc. /-om/ 𐤌 m (a.V. /-nom/ 𐤍𐤌 nm)
3rd fem. /-am/ 𐤌 m (a.V. /-nam/ 𐤍𐤌 nm)

In addition, according to some research, the same written forms of the enclitics that are attested after vowels are also found after a singular noun in what must have been the genitive case (which ended in /-i/, whereas the plural version ended in /-ē/). Their pronunciation can then be reconstructed somewhat differently: first-person singular /-iya(ː)/ 𐤉 j, third-person singular masculine and feminine /-iyu(ː)/ 𐤉 j and /-iya(ː)/ 𐤉 j. The third-person plural singular and feminine must have pronounced the same in both cases, i.e. /-nōm/ 𐤍𐤌 nm and /-nēm/ 𐤍𐤌 nm.

These enclitic forms vary between the dialects. In the archaic Byblian dialect, the third person forms are 𐤄 h and 𐤅 w /-ō/ for the masculine singular (a.V. 𐤅 w /-ēw/), 𐤄 h /-aha(ː)/ for the feminine singular and 𐤅𐤌 hm /-hum(ma)/ for the masculine plural. In late Punic, the 3rd masculine singular is usually /-im/ 𐤌 m.

The same enclitic pronouns are also attached to verbs to denote direct objects. In that function, some of them have slightly divergent forms: first singular /-nī/ 𐤍 n and probably first plural /-nu(ː)/.

The near demonstrative pronouns ("this") are written, in standard Phoenician, 𐤆 z [za] for the singular and 𐤀𐤋 ʼl [ʔilːa] for the plural. Cypriot Phoenician displays 𐤀𐤆 ʼz [ʔizːa] instead of 𐤆 z [za]. Byblian still distinguishes, in the singular, a masculine zn [zan] / z [za] from a feminine 𐤆𐤕 zt [zuːt] / 𐤆𐤀 zʼ [zuː]. There are also many variations in Punic, including 𐤎𐤕 st [suːt] and 𐤆𐤕 zt [zuːt] for both genders in the singular. The far demonstrative pronouns ("that") are identical to the independent third-person pronouns. The interrogative pronouns are /miya/ or perhaps /mi/ 𐤌𐤉 my "who" and /muː/ 𐤌 m "what". The indefinite pronouns are written 𐤌𐤍𐤌 mnm ("anything/something/nothing," possibly pronounced [miːnumːa], similar to Akkadian [miːnumːeː]) and 𐤌𐤍𐤊 mnk (possibly pronounced [miːnukːa]). The relative pronoun is a 𐤔 š [ʃi], either followed or preceded by a vowel.

The definite article was /ha-/, and the first consonant of the following word was doubled. It was written 𐤄 h but in late Punic also 𐤀 ʼ and 𐤏 ʻ because of the weakening and coalescence of the gutturals. Much as in Biblical Hebrew, the initial consonant of the article is dropped after the prepositions 𐤁 b-, 𐤋 l- and 𐤊 k-; it could also be lost after various other particles and function words, such the direct object marker 𐤀𐤉𐤕 ʼjt and the conjunction 𐤅 w- "and".

Of the cardinal numerals from 1 to 10, 1 is an adjective, 2 is formally a noun in the dual and the rest are nouns in the singular. They all distinguish gender: 𐤀𐤇𐤃 ʼḥd, 𐤀𐤔𐤍𐤌/𐤔𐤍𐤌 (ʼ)šnm (construct state 𐤀𐤔𐤍/𐤔𐤍 (ʼ)šn), 𐤔𐤋𐤔 šlš, 𐤀𐤓𐤁𐤏 ʼrbʻ, 𐤇𐤌𐤔 ḥmš, 𐤔𐤔 šš, 𐤔𐤁𐤏 šbʻ, 𐤔𐤌𐤍/𐤔𐤌𐤍𐤄 šmn(h), 𐤕𐤔𐤏 tšʻ, 𐤏𐤔𐤓/𐤏𐤎𐤓 ʻšr/ʻsr vs 𐤀𐤇𐤕 ʼḥt, 𐤔𐤕𐤌 štm, 𐤔𐤋𐤔𐤕 šlšt, 𐤀𐤓𐤁𐤏𐤕 ʼrbʻt, 𐤇𐤌𐤔𐤕 ḥmšt, 𐤔𐤔𐤕 ššt, 𐤔𐤁𐤏𐤕 šbʻt, 𐤔𐤌𐤍𐤕 šmnt, unattested, 𐤏𐤔𐤓𐤕 ʻšrt. The tens are morphologically masculine plurals of the ones: 𐤏𐤔𐤓𐤌/𐤏𐤎𐤓𐤌 ʻsrm/ʻšrm, 𐤔𐤋𐤔𐤌 šlšm, 𐤀𐤓𐤁𐤏𐤌 ʼrbʻm, 𐤇𐤌𐤔𐤌 ḥmšm, 𐤔𐤔𐤌 ššm, 𐤔𐤁𐤏𐤌 šbʻm, 𐤔𐤌𐤍𐤌 šmnm, 𐤕𐤔𐤏𐤌 tšʻm. "One hundred" is 𐤌𐤀𐤕 mʼt, two hundred is its dual form 𐤌𐤀𐤕𐤌 mʼtm, whereas the rest are formed as in 𐤔𐤋𐤔 𐤌𐤀𐤕 šlš mʼt (three hundred). One thousand is 𐤀𐤋𐤐 ʼlp. Ordinal numerals are formed by the addition of *ij 𐤉 -j. Composite numerals are formed with w- 𐤅 "and", e.g. 𐤏𐤔𐤓 𐤅𐤔𐤍𐤌 ʻšr w šnm for "twelve".

=== Verbal morphology ===
The verb inflects for person, number, gender, tense and mood. Like for other Semitic languages, Phoenician verbs have different "verbal patterns" or "stems", expressing manner of action, level of transitivity and voice. The perfect or suffix-conjugation, which expresses the past tense, is exemplified below with the root 𐤐𐤏𐤋 p-ʻ-l "to do" (a "neutral", G-stem).

Singular:

- 1st: /paʻalti/ 𐤐𐤏𐤋𐤕𐤉 pʻlty
- 2nd masc. /paʻalta/ 𐤐𐤏𐤋𐤕 pʻlt
- 2nd fem. /paʻalt(i)/ 𐤐𐤏𐤋𐤕 pʻlt
- 3rd masc. /paʻal/ 𐤐𐤏𐤋 pʻl
- 3rd fem. /paʻala(t)/ 𐤐𐤏𐤋𐤕 pʻlt, also 𐤐𐤏𐤋 pʻl, Punic 𐤐𐤏𐤋𐤀 pʻlʼ

Plural:

- 1st: /paʻalnu/ 𐤐𐤏𐤋𐤍 pʻln
- 2nd masc. /paʻaltim/ 𐤐𐤏𐤋𐤕𐤌 pʻltm
- 2nd fem. unattested, perhaps /paʻaltin/ 𐤐𐤏𐤋𐤕𐤍 pʻltn
- 3rd masc. /paʻalu/ 𐤐𐤏𐤋 pʻl, Punic 𐤐𐤏𐤋𐤀 pʻlʼ
- 3rd fem. /paʻalu/ 𐤐𐤏𐤋 pʻl, Punic 𐤐𐤏𐤋𐤀 pʻlʼ

The imperfect or prefix-conjugation, which expresses the present and future tense (and which is not distinguishable from the descendant of the Proto-Semitic jussive expressing wishes), is exemplified below, again with the root p-ʻ-l.

- 1st: /ʼapʻul/ 𐤀𐤐𐤏𐤋 ʼpʻl
- 2nd masc. /tapʻul/ 𐤕𐤐𐤏𐤋 tpʻl
- 2nd fem. /tapʻulī/ 𐤕𐤐𐤏𐤋𐤉 tpʻly
- 3rd masc. /yapʻul/ 𐤉𐤐𐤏𐤋 ypʻl
- 3rd fem. /tapʻul/ 𐤕𐤐𐤏𐤋 tpʻl

Plural:

- 1st: /napʻul/ 𐤍𐤐𐤏𐤋 npʻl
- 2nd masc. /tapʻulū(n)/ 𐤕𐤐𐤏𐤋 *tpʻl, Punic 𐤕𐤐𐤏𐤋𐤀 *tpʻlʼ
- 2nd fem. /tapʻulna/ 𐤕𐤐𐤏𐤋𐤍 tpʻln
- 3rd masc. /yapʻulū(n)/ 𐤉𐤐𐤏𐤋 ypʻl
- 3rd fem. */yapʻulna/ 𐤉𐤐𐤏𐤋𐤍 ypʻln

The imperative endings were presumably /-∅/, /-ī/ and /-ū/ for the second-person singular masculine, second-person singular feminine and second-person plural masculine respectively, but all three forms surface in the orthography as /puʻul/ 𐤐𐤏𐤋 pʻl: -∅. The old Semitic jussive, which originally differed slightly from the prefix conjugation, is no longer possible to separate from it in Phoenician with the present data.

The non-finite forms are the infinitive construct, the infinitive absolute and the active and passive participles. In the G-stem, the infinitive construct is usually combined with the preposition 𐤋 l- "to", as in 𐤋𐤐𐤏𐤋 /lipʻul/ "to do"; in contrast, the infinitive absolute 𐤐𐤏𐤋 (paʻōl) is mostly used to strengthen the meaning of a subsequent finite verb with the same root: 𐤐𐤕𐤇 𐤕𐤐𐤕𐤇 ptḥ tptḥ "you will indeed open!", accordingly /𐤐𐤏𐤋 𐤕𐤐𐤏𐤋 *paʻōl tipʻul/ "you will indeed do!".

The participles had, in the G-stem, the following forms:

Active:

- Masculine singular /pōʻil/ later /pūʻel/ 𐤐𐤏𐤋 pʻl, plural /poʻlim/ or /pōʻilīm/ 𐤐𐤏𐤋𐤌 pʻlm
- Feminine singular /pōʻilat/ 𐤐𐤏𐤋𐤕 pʻlt, plural /pōʻilōt/ 𐤐𐤏𐤋𐤕 pʻlt

Passive:

- Masculine singular /paʻūl/ or /paʻīl/ 𐤐𐤏𐤋 pʻl, plural /paʻūlīm/ 𐤐𐤏𐤋𐤌 pʻlm
- Feminine singular /paʻūlat/ 𐤐𐤏𐤋𐤕 pʻlt, plural /paʻūlōt/ 𐤐𐤏𐤋𐤕 pʻlt

The missing forms above can be inferred from the correspondences between the Proto-Northwest Semitic ancestral forms and the attested Phoenician counterparts: the PNWS participle forms are */pāʻil-, pāʻilīma, pāʻil(a)t, pāʻilāt, paʻūl, paʻūlīm, paʻult or paʻūlat, paʻūlāt/.

The derived stems are:

- the N-stem (functioning as a passive), e.g. /napʻal/ 𐤍𐤐𐤏𐤋 npʻl, the N-formant being lost in the prefix conjugation while assimilating and doubling the first root consonant 𐤉𐤐𐤏𐤋 (ypʻl).
- the D-stem (functioning as a factitive): the forms must have been 𐤐𐤏𐤋 /piʻʻil/ in the suffix conjugation, 𐤉𐤐𐤏𐤋 /yapaʻʻil/ in the prefix conjugation, 𐤐𐤏𐤋 /paʻʻil/ in the imperative and the infinitive construct, 𐤐𐤏𐤋 /paʻʻōl/ in the infinitive absolute and 𐤌𐤐𐤏𐤋 /mapaʻʻil/ in the participle. The characteristic doubling of the middle consonant is only identifiable in foreign alphabet transcriptions.
- the C-stem (functioning as a causative): the original 𐤄 *ha- prefix has produced 𐤉 *yi- rather than the Hebrew ה *hi-. The forms were apparently 𐤉𐤐𐤏𐤋 /yipʻil/ in the suffix conjugation 𐤀𐤐𐤏𐤋(/ʼipʻil/ in late Punic), 𐤉𐤐𐤏𐤋 /yapʻil/ in the prefix conjugation, and the infinitive is also 𐤉𐤐𐤏𐤋 /yapʻil/, while the participle was probably 𐤌𐤐𐤏𐤋 /mapʻil/ or, in late Punic at least, 𐤌𐤐𐤏𐤋 /mipʻil/.

Most of the stems apparently also had passive and reflexive counterparts, the former differing through vowels, the latter also through the infix 𐤕 -t-. The G stem passive is attested as 𐤐𐤉𐤏𐤋 pyʻl, /pyʻal/ < */puʻal/; t-stems can be reconstructed as 𐤉𐤕𐤐𐤏𐤋 ytpʻl /yitpaʻil/ (tG) and 𐤉𐤕𐤐𐤏𐤋 yptʻʻl /yiptaʻʻil/ (Dt).

=== Prepositions and particles ===
Some prepositions are always prefixed to nouns, deleting, if present, the initial /h/ of the definite article: such are 𐤁 b- "in", 𐤋 l- "to, for", 𐤊 k- "as" and 𐤌 m- /min/ "from". They are sometimes found in forms extended through the addition of 𐤍 -n or 𐤕 -t. Other prepositions are not like that: 𐤀𐤋ʻl "upon", .𐤏𐤃 ʻd "until", 𐤀𐤇𐤓 ʼḥr "after", 𐤕𐤇𐤕 tḥt "under", 𐤁𐤉𐤍, 𐤁𐤍 b(y)n "between". New prepositions are formed with nouns: 𐤋𐤐𐤍 lpn "in front of", from 𐤋 l- "to" and 𐤐𐤍 pn "face". There is a special preposited marker of a definite object 𐤀𐤉𐤕 ʼyt (/ʼiyyūt/?), which, unlike Hebrew, is clearly distinct from the preposition את ʼt (/ʼitt/).

The most common negative marker is 𐤁𐤋 bl (/bal/), negating verbs but sometimes also nouns; another one is 𐤀𐤉 ʼy (/ʼī/), expressing both nonexistence and the negation of verbs. Negative commands or prohibitions are expressed with 𐤀𐤋 ʼl (/ʼal/). "Lest" is 𐤋𐤌 lm. Some common conjunctions are 𐤅 w (originally perhaps /wa-?/, but certainly /u-/ in Late Punic), "and" 𐤀𐤌 ʼm (/ʼim/), "when", and 𐤊 k (/kī/), "that; because; when". There was also a conjunction 𐤀𐤐/𐤐 (ʼ)p (/ʼap/"also". 𐤋 l- (/lū, li/) could (rarely) be used to introduce desiderative constructions ("may he do X!"). 𐤋 l- could also introduce vocatives. Both prepositions and conjunctions could form compounds.

== Syntax ==
The basic word order is verb-subject-object. There is no verb "to be" in the present tense; in clauses that would have used a copula, the subject may come before the predicate. Nouns precede their modifiers, such as adjectives and possessors.

== Vocabulary and word formation ==
Most nouns are formed by a combination of consonantal roots and vocalic patterns, but they can be formed also with prefixes (𐤌 /m-/, expressing actions or their results, and rarely 𐤕 /t-/) and suffixes /-ūn/. Abstracts can be formed with the suffix 𐤕 -t (probably /-īt/, /-ūt/). Adjectives can be formed following the familiar Semitic nisba suffix /-īy/ 𐤉 y 𐤑𐤃𐤍𐤉 (e.g. ṣdny "Sidonian").

Like the grammar, the vocabulary is very close to Biblical Hebrew, but some peculiarities attract attention. For example, the copula verb "to be" is 𐤊𐤍 kn (as in Arabic, as opposed to Hebrew and Aramaic היה hyh) and the verb "to do" is 𐤐𐤏𐤋 pʿl (as in Aramaic פעל pʿl and Arabic فعل fʿl, as opposed to Hebrew עשה ʿśh, though in Hebrew פעל pʿl has the similar meaning "to act").

Standard Phoenician Sarcophagus inscription of Tabnit of Sidon, 5th century BC
Text	Transliteration	Transcription
𐤀𐤍𐤊 𐤕𐤁𐤍𐤕 𐤊𐤄𐤍 𐤏𐤔𐤕𐤓𐤕 𐤌𐤋𐤊 𐤑𐤃𐤍𐤌 𐤁𐤍 𐤀𐤔𐤌𐤍𐤏𐤆𐤓 𐤊𐤄𐤍 𐤏𐤔𐤕𐤓𐤕 𐤌𐤋𐤊 𐤑𐤃𐤍𐤌 𐤔𐤊𐤁 𐤁𐤀𐤓𐤍 𐤆 𐤌𐤉 𐤀𐤕 𐤊𐤋 𐤀𐤃𐤌 𐤀𐤔 𐤕𐤐𐤒 𐤀𐤉𐤕 𐤄𐤀𐤓𐤍 𐤆 𐤀𐤋 𐤀𐤋 𐤕𐤐𐤕𐤇 𐤏𐤋𐤕𐤉 𐤅𐤀𐤋 𐤕𐤓𐤂𐤆𐤍 𐤊 𐤀𐤉 𐤀𐤓𐤋𐤍 𐤊𐤎𐤐 𐤀𐤉 𐤀𐤓 𐤋𐤍 𐤇𐤓𐤑 𐤅𐤊𐤋 𐤌𐤍𐤌 𐤌𐤔𐤃 𐤁𐤋𐤕 𐤀𐤍𐤊 𐤔𐤊𐤁 𐤁𐤀𐤓𐤍 𐤆 𐤀𐤋 𐤀𐤋 𐤕𐤐𐤕𐤇 𐤏𐤋𐤕𐤉 𐤅𐤀𐤋 𐤕𐤓𐤂𐤆𐤍 𐤊 𐤕𐤏𐤁𐤕 𐤏𐤔𐤕𐤓𐤕 𐤄𐤃𐤁𐤓 𐤄𐤀 𐤅𐤀𐤌 𐤐𐤕𐤇 𐤕𐤐𐤕𐤇 𐤏𐤋𐤕𐤉 𐤅𐤓𐤂𐤆 𐤕𐤓𐤂𐤆𐤍 𐤀𐤋 𐤉𐤊𐤍 𐤆𐤓𐤏 𐤁𐤇𐤉𐤌 𐤕𐤇𐤕 𐤔𐤌𐤔 𐤅𐤌𐤔𐤊𐤁 𐤀𐤕 𐤓𐤐𐤀𐤌	ʾnk tbnt khn ʿštrt mlk ṣdnm bn ʾšmnʿzr khn ʿštrt mlk ṣdnm škb bʾrn z mj ʾt kl ʾdm ʾš tpq ʾjt hʾrn z ʾl ʾl tptḥ ʿltj wʾl trgzn k ʾj ʾrln ksp ʾj ʾr ln ḥrṣ wkl mnm mšd blt ʾnk škb bʾrn z ʾl ʾl tptḥ ʿltj wʾl trgzn k tʿbt ʿštrt hdbr hʾ wʾm ptḥ tptḥ ʿltj wrgz trgzn ʾl jkn zrʿ bḥjm tḥt šmš wmškb ʾt rpʾm	ʾanōk(ī) Tabnīt kōhēn ʿAštart mīlk Ṣīdūnīm bīn ʾEšmūnʿūzēr kōhēn ʿAštart mīlk Ṣīdūnīm šūkēb bāʾarūn ze(h) mī ʾata kūl ʾadōm ʾīš tūpaq ʾījat hāʾarūn ze ʾal ʾal tīptaḥ ʿalōtīja waʾal targīzenī kī ʾīj ʾarū[ ]lanī kesep waʾal ʾīj ʾarū lanī ḥūreṣ wakūl manīm mašōd būltī ʾanōk(ī) šūkēb bāʾarūn ze ʾal ʾal tīptaḥ ʿalōtīja waʾal targīzenī kī tōʿebūt ʿAštart hadōbōr hīʾa wāʾīm pōtōḥ tīptaḥ ʿalōtīja waragōz targīzenī ʾal jakūn zeraʿ baḥajīm taḥat šamš wamīškōb ʾet Repaʾīm
Translation
I, Tabnit, priest of Astarte, king of Sidon, the son of Eshmunazar, priest of Astarte, king of Sidon, am lying in this sarcophagus. Whoever you are, any man that might find this sarcophagus, don't, don't open it and don't disturb me, for no silver is gathered with me, no gold is gathered with me, nor anything of value whatsoever, only I am lying in this sarcophagus. Don't, don't open it and don't disturb me, for this thing is an abomination to Astarte. And if you do indeed open it and do indeed disturb me, may you not have any seed among the living under the sun, nor a resting-place with the Rephaites.

Late Punic 1st century BC
Text	Greek transliteration	Reconstruction (by Igor Diakonov)		Inferred transcription
ΛΑΔΟΥΝ ΛΥΒΑΛ ΑΜΟΥΝ; ΟΥ ΛΥΡΥΒΑΘΩΝ ΘΙΝΙΘ ΦΑΝΕ ΒΑΛ; ΥΣ ΝΑΔΩΡ ΣΩΣΙΠΑΤΙΟΣ ΒΥΝ ΖΟΠΥΡΟΣ; ΣΑΜΩ ΚΟΥΛΩ ΒΑΡΑΧΩ	Ladun liBal Amun u liribathōn Thīnīth phane Bal is nadōr Sōsīpatīos bin Zopuros samō kulō barakhō	𐤋𐤀𐤃𐤍 𐤋𐤁𐤏𐤋 𐤇𐤌𐤍 𐤅𐤋𐤓𐤁𐤕𐤍 𐤕𐤍𐤕 𐤐𐤍 𐤁𐤏𐤋 𐤀𐤔 𐤍𐤃𐤓 𐤎 𐤁𐤍 𐤆 𐤔𐤌𐤏 𐤒𐤋𐤀 𐤁𐤓𐤊𐤀	lʾdn lbʿl ḥmn wlrbtn tnt pn bʿl ʾš ndr S. bn Z. šmʾ qlʾ brkʾ	lāʾadūn līBaʿl Ḥamūn wūlīrībatōn(ū) Tīnīt pāne Baʿl ʾīš nadōr S(osipatius) bīn Z(opyrus) šamōʾ qūlōʾ barakōʾ
Translation
To the master Baal Hammon and to our mistress Tanit, the face of Baal, [that] which consecrated Sosipatius, son of Zopyrus. He heard his voice and blessed him.

== Survival and influences of Punic ==
The significantly divergent later form of the language that was spoken in the Tyrian Phoenician colony of Carthage is known as Punic and remained in use there for considerably longer than Phoenician did in Phoenicia itself by arguably surviving into Augustine of Hippo's time. Throughout its existence, Punic co-existed with the Berber languages, which were then native to Tunisia (including Carthage) and North Africa. It is possible that Punic may have survived the Muslim conquest of the Maghreb in some small isolated area: the geographer al-Bakri describes a people speaking a language that was not Berber, Latin or Coptic in the city of Sirte in rural Ifriqiya, a region in which spoken Punic survived well past its written use. However, it is likely that arabisation of the Punics was facilitated by their language belonging to the same group (both being Semitic languages) as that of the conquerors and thus having many grammatical and lexical similarities.

The ancient Libyco-Berber alphabet that is still in irregular use by modern Berber groups such as the Tuareg is known by the native name Tifinagh, possibly a derived form of a cognate of the name "Punic". Still, a direct derivation from the Phoenician-Punic script is debated and far from established since the two writing systems are very different. As far as language (not the script) is concerned, some borrowings from Punic appear in modern Berber dialects: one interesting example is agadir "wall" from Punic gader.

Perhaps the most interesting case of Punic influence is that of the name of Hispania (the Iberian Peninsula, comprising Portugal and Spain), which, according to one of the theories, is derived from the Punic I-Shaphan meaning "coast of hyraxes", in turn a misidentification on the part of Phoenician explorers of its numerous rabbits as hyraxes. Another case is the name of a tribe of hostile "hairy people" that Hanno the Navigator found in the Gulf of Guinea. The name given to those people by Hanno the Navigator's interpreters was transmitted from Punic into Greek as gorillai and was applied in 1847 by Thomas S. Savage to the western gorilla.

== Surviving examples ==
Phoenician, together with Punic, is primarily known from approximately 10,000 surviving inscriptions, supplemented by occasional glosses in books written in other languages. In addition to their many inscriptions, the Phoenicians are believed to have left numerous other types of written sources, but most have not survived.

The Phoenician alphabetic script was easy to write on papyrus or parchment sheets, and the use of these materials explains why virtually no Phoenician writings – no history, no trading records – have come down to us. In their cities by the sea, the air and soil were damp, and papyrus and leather moldered and rotted away. Thus disappeared the literature of the people who taught a large portion of the earth's population to write. The only written documents of Phoenicians and Carthaginians are monumental inscriptions on stone, a few ephemeral letters or notes on pieces of broken pottery, and three fragmentary papyri. Thus, no Tyrian primary sources dating from Hiram I's time are available.

Roman authors, such as Sallust, allude to some books written in the Punic language, but none have survived except occasionally in translation (e.g., Mago's treatise) or in snippets (e.g., in Plautus' plays). The Cippi of Melqart, a bilingual inscription in Ancient Greek and Carthaginian discovered in Malta in 1694, was the key which allowed French scholar Jean-Jacques Barthélemy to decipher and reconstruct the alphabet in 1758. Even as late as 1837 only 70 Phoenician inscriptions were known to scholars. These were compiled in Wilhelm Gesenius's Scripturae linguaeque Phoeniciae monumenta, which comprised all that was known of Phoenician by scholars at that time.

Basically, its core consists of the comprehensive edition, or re-edition of 70 Phoenician and some more non-Phoenician inscriptions... However, just to note the advances made in the nineteenth century, it is noteworthy that Gesenius’ precursor Hamaker, in his Miscellanea Phoenicia of 1828, had only 13 inscriptions at his disposal. On the other hand only 30 years later the amount of Phoenician inscribed monuments had grown so enormously that Schröder in his compendium Die phönizische Sprache. Entwurf einer Grammatik nebst Sprach- und Schriftproben of 1869 could state that Gesenius knew only a quarter of the material Schröder had at hand himself.

Some key surviving inscriptions of Phoenician are:

- Ahiram sarcophagus
- Bodashtart inscriptions
- Çineköy inscription
- Cippi of Melqart
- Mdina Steles
- Sarcophagus of Eshmunazar II
- Tabnit sarcophagus
- Karatepe bilingual
- Kilamuwa Stela
- Nora Stone
- Pyrgi Tablets
- Temple of Eshmun

Since the bilingual Pyrgi Tablets were found in 1964 with inscriptions in both Etruscan and Phoenician dating from around 500 BC, more Etruscan has been deciphered through comparison to the more fully understood Phoenician.

== See also ==
- Kanaanäische und Aramäische Inschriften
- Punic language
- Phoenician alphabet
- Ugaritic
- Proto-Sinaitic
- Extinct language
- List of extinct languages of Asia
- Phoenician-Punic literature
