= Ben-Azen =

Ancient Egyptian official

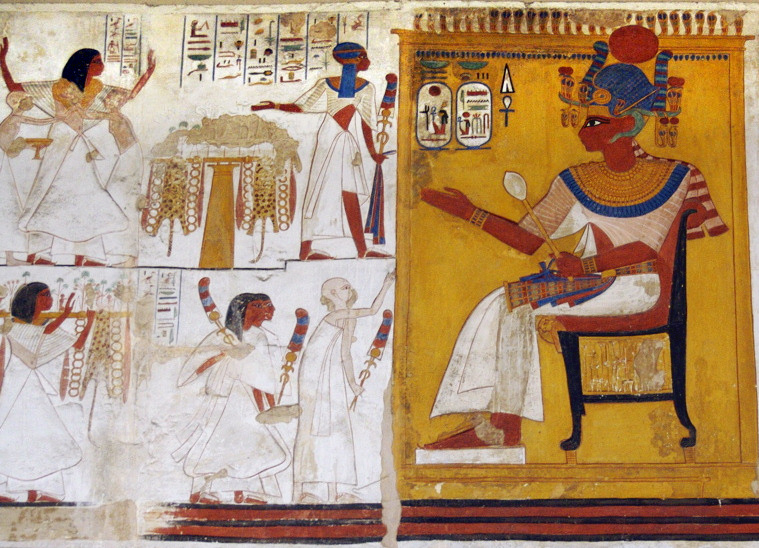
A depiction of a light skinned foreign servant of Ramses II amongst his son and local servants, it may be Ben-Azen or reflect his appearance

Ben-Azen (Canaanite for "Son of Azen") or Ramesses-em-per-Ra (Egyptian for "Ramesses in the House of Ra") was an Asiatic official in the 19th Dynasty of ancient Egypt (ca. 1200 BC) at the court of pharaohs Ramses II and his son, Merneptah. He was titled "Cup Bearer".

According to an inscription ascribed to him, Ben-Azen came to Egypt from Northern Jordan, thus a Canaanite. Like many "butlers" (a term coined for officials of foreign descent) in the Ramesside era, he reflects the Royal Court's contemporary Asiatic tone.
