= Phoenician arrowheads =

Phoenician inscribed bronze arrowheads

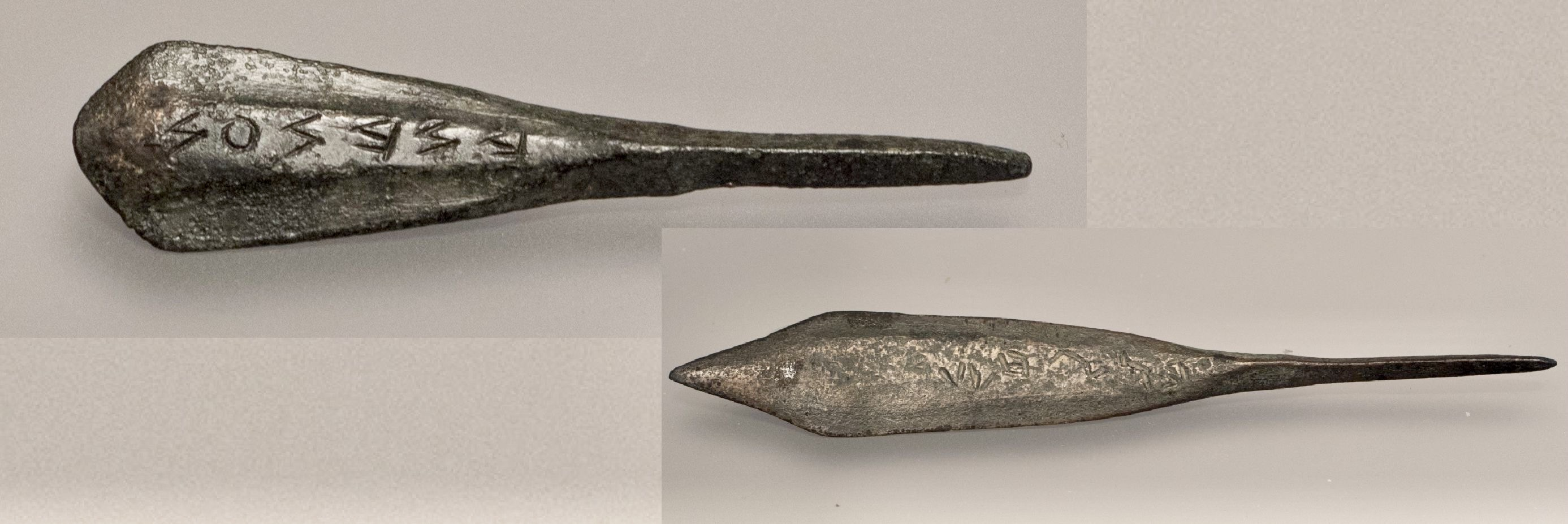
Phoenician arrowheads from the National Museum of Beirut: from Beqaa Valley, bronze, 12th–11th Century BC (left); and from Lebanon, bronze, 12th–11th Century BC (right)

The Phoenician arrowheads or Phoenician javelin heads are a well-known group of almost 70 Phoenician inscribed bronze arrowheads from the 11th century BC onwards.

The first known inscription was the Ruweiseh arrowhead; it is the only one found in situ. The other arrowheads are of unknown origin, having first appeared on the antiquities markets.

The inscriptions are thought to be personal names.

They are known as KAI 20–22.

Because of their early date, the arrowheads are important in the modern understanding of the history of the Phoenician language; in particular, the 1953 discovery of the three al-Khader arrowheads is said to have "initiated a new stage in the study of alphabetic origins". It has become conventional to refer to the written script as "Proto-Canaanite" until the mid-11th century BC, the point at which "Phoenician" is first attested on the arrowheads. Frank Moore Cross and Józef Milik wrote in 1954 that "[t]he el-Khadr javelin-heads provide the missing link between the latest of the Proto-Canaanite epigraphs, and the earliest of the Phoenician inscriptions".

== Ruweiseh arrowhead ==
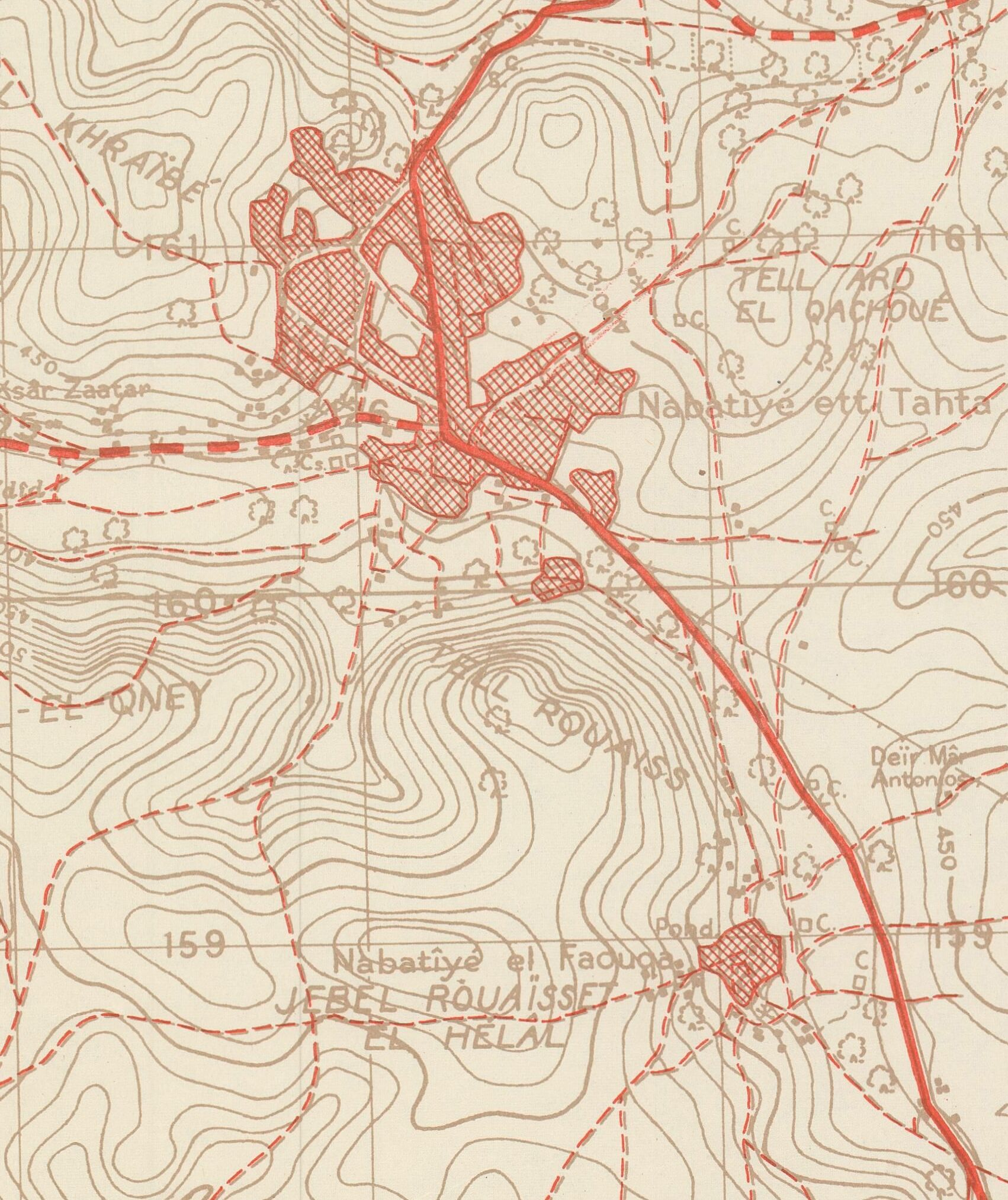
Tell Rouaiss and Jebel Rouaïsset on a 1943 map of Nabatieh and Nabatieh Fawka

The Ruweiseh arrowhead was the first discovered in modern times, and still the only one found in archaeological context. It was found at Roueisseh, near Nabatieh Fawka ("Upper Nabatieh), by Pierre Giugues during an archaeological survey of necropolises in the area and published in 1926. Two arrowheads were discovered in the same tomb, but the second had no inscription. The tomb had been reused into the Hellenistic period, such that the contents of the tombs were overturned, making any stratigraphic study impossible.

The arrowhead was dated based on its paleographic style, with scholars concluding that it was probably produced during the 10th century BCE

The inscription states: "arrow of Addo, son of Akki".

It is currently in the Louvre.

== Al-Khader arrowheads ==
The next set of arrowheads (described as javelin heads) were published in 1954; three inscribed arrowheads were purchased separately on the antiquities market in 1953–54, by Gerald Lankester Harding, Frank Moore Cross and Józef Milik. They were later ascertained to have been part of a hoard of 26 javelin and arrowheads (mostly uninscribed) found by a fellah from al-Khader, just west of Bethlehem.

Given their age, these three artifacts are considered perhaps the most significant in the known corpus. They used vertical and left-to-right letters, representing a transitional stage between early Iron Age Phoenician scripts and the prior proto-Canaanite inscriptions. Cross and Milik wrote in 1954: "As there is no evidence for the occupation of the site earlier than the Roman period, the cache may have been lost or buried with its owner, during or after a battle."

The name mentioned in the three inscriptions is almost exactly the same, ˁbdlb(ˀ)t. Surprisingly, this same name appears on the Ruweiseh arrowhead. Cross and Milik wrote that “if it is not pure coincidence, this may be an indication that a hereditary and/or mercenary archer class existed."

== List ==
Name	Inscription	Original location	Current location and ID	Reference
Ruweiseh / KAI 20	btʾdʾ bn ʿky	Ruweiseh (Kfar Jarra?)	Louvre, AO 18849	Guiges/Roncevalle, 1926; Dussaud, 1927
Al Khadr I / KAI 21	hs ʿbdlbʾt	al-Khader	Rockefeller Museum IDAM 54,1	Milik & Cross 1954 Albright, 1954; Dussaud, 1954.
Al Khadr II	h? ʿbdlbt	al-Khader	Harvard Semitic Museum 982.1.1	Milik & Cross 1954 Albright, 1954; Dussaud, 1954.
Al Khadr III		al-Khader	Amman, Archaeological Museum. J 5137	Milik & Cross 1954 Albright, 1954; Dussaud, 1954.
Al Khadr IV	hf ʿbdlʾt	al-Khader	Israel Museum p-526288	Cross 1980
Al Khadr V	ʿbdlbʾt bnʿnt	al-Khader	Jerusalem, private collection.	Cross 1980
KAI 22	hf zkrbʿl] bn bnʿn[t]	Unprovenanced	Beirut National Museum	Milik 1956; Yeivin, 1958
	hs grbl fdny	Unprovenanced	Beirut National Museum Nr. 5137.	Milik, 1961
	hs ʿzrbʿl bn ʾdnbʿl	Unprovenanced	Beirut National Museum Nr. 677.	Milik, 1961
	hf rpʾ bn yhš	Unprovenanced	Beirut National Museum	Martin, 1962.
	hs ytʾ bn zmʾ	Unprovenanced	Paris, private collection	Sauvegarde 1980 – Lipinski, Gubel 1986.
	hf zkrM mlk / ʾmr	Unprovenanced	Beirut National Museum	Starcky, 1982; Mazza, 1987; Lemaire, 1989, 542.
	hf ʿbdny •s ʾzbʿl	Unprovenanced	Lebanon, private collection	Bordreuil 1982, p. 189
	... ʾky ...	Unprovenanced	Beirut National Museum	Bordreuil 1982, p. 189
	hf ymn ʾs ʿbdy	Unprovenanced	Beirut National Museum	Bordreuil 1982, p. 189
	Unpublished	Unprovenanced	Private collection.	Bordreuil 1982, p. 189
	Unpublished	Unprovenanced	Private collection.	Bordreuil 1982, p. 189
	Unpublished	Unprovenanced	Private collection.	Bordreuil 1982, p. 189
	hf ʾdʿ bn blʾ	Unprovenanced	British Museum WA 13 67 53.	Mitchell, 1985.
	hf mhrn bn ytl	Unprovenanced	Jerusalem, private collection	Lemaire, 1989
	Unpublished	Unprovenanced	Israel Museum. 86.59.87.	Sass, 1988, 98.
	Unpublished	Unprovenanced	Israel Museum 86.59.88	Sass, 1988, 98.
	hfpdy bn qry	Unprovenanced	Beirut, private collection.	Sader, 1990.
	hf ʾdn Sʾ/r	Unprovenanced	Church of Saint Anne, Jerusalem	Tarragon 1991
