= Izbet Sartah abecedary =

Izbet Sartah site where the abecedary was discovered

The Izbet Sartah abecedary is one of the oldest known non-cuneiform abecedaries ever discovered. It was found in 1976 on a clay potsherd (ostracon) during excavations directed by archaeologist Moshe Kochavi at the site of Izbet Sartah in Israel, frequently identified as biblical Eben-ezer. The inscription dates back to the 12th or early 11th century BCE, or the early Iron Age, and it provides important evidence regarding the evolution of the Proto-Canaanite script into the early Hebrew alphabet

The sherd features five lines of text written in an early Proto-Canaanite (or early linear West Semitic) script, and the abecedary is found at the end. The first four lines of the text do not seem to form readable words, and are widely believed to be the practice exercises of an unskilled student scribe. Nevertheless some scholars interpreted these writings in legible ways. The original ostracon is preserved at the Israel Museum in Jerusalem.

The Izbet Sartah mound is located to the north of the town of Rosh HaAyin, in the fields between Rosh HaAyin and the nearby town of Kfar Qasim.

In the excavations of this unfortified site, scholars discovered three levels of settlement, that were all short-lived. The earliest level was Stratum III, and it is believed to date to the twelfth century BCE.

== See also ==
- Tel Zayit abecedary
- Gezer calendar

== Bibliography ==
- Cross, F. M. 1980. “Newly Found Inscriptions in Old Canaanite and Early Phoenician Scripts.” Bulletin of the American Schools of Oriental Research 238: 1-20.
- Demsky, A. 1977. “A Proto-Canaanite Abecedary (‘Izbet Sartah).” Tel Aviv 4, 1-2: 14-27.
- Dotan, A. 1980. “New Light on the `Izbet Sartah Ostracon.” Tel Aviv 8, 2: 160-72.
- Finkelstein, I. 1983. “Israelite Settlement in the Foothills, 13th-10th Century BC, in the LIght of Excavations at Izbet-Sartah.” Cathedra 27: 33-38.
- Finkelstein, I., and I. Aranne. 1986. ‘Isbet Sartah: A Early Iron Age Site near Rosh Ha'ayin, Israel. Oxford: B.A.R.
- Garsiel, M., and I. Finkelstein. 1978. “The Westward Expansion of the House of Joseph in the Light of the `Izbet Sartah Excavations.” Tel Aviv 5, 3-4: 192-98.
- Kochavi, M. 1977. “An Ostracon of the Period of the Judges from `Izbet Sartah.” Tel Aviv 4, 1-2: 1-13.
- Kochavi, M., and A. Demsky. 1978. “An Alphabet from the Days of the Judges.” Biblical Archaeology Review 4, 3: 22-30.
- Kochavi, M., and A. Demsky. 1978. “An Israelite Village from the Days of the Judges.” Biblical Archaeology Review 4, 3: 19-22.
- Kochavi, M., and A. Demsky. 1978. “A Proto-Canaanite Abecedary from ‘Izbet Sartah.” Qadmoniot 11, 2-3: 61-67.
- Kochavi, M., and I. Finkelstein. 1978. “Izbet Sartah 1976-1978.” Revue Biblique 86: 114-15.
- Kochavi, M., and I. Finkelstein. 1978. “Izbet Sartah, 1976-1978.” Israel Exploration Journal 28, 4: 267-68.
- Naveh, J. 1978. “Some Considerations on the Ostracon from ‘Izbet Sartah.” Israel Exploration Journal 28: 31-35.
