= Assens =

Assens may refer to:

- Assens, Denmark
  - Assens Municipality
- Assens, Vaud, Switzerland
- Rafael Cansinos-Asséns (1882–1964), a Spanish poet, essayist, literary critic

== See also ==
- Asse (disambiguation)
- Assen (disambiguation)
