= Canaanite languages =

Large dialect continuum from the Levant and Mesopotamia

Canaanite
- Geographic distribution: Levant, Ancient Carthage
- Ethnicity: Hebrews, Israelites, Phoenicians, Philistines, Moabites, Ammonites, Edomites
- Linguistic classification: Afroasiatic: Semitic; West Semitic; Central Semitic; Northwest Semitic; Canaanite
- Subdivisions: Amarna Canaanite † • Canaano-Akkadian†; Amorite? †; North † • Philistine † • Phoenician † • Punic †; South • Hebrew • Ammonite † • Moabite † • Edomite †

Language codes
- Glottolog: cana1267

The Canaanite languages, sometimes referred to as Canaanite dialects, are one of four subgroups of the Northwest Semitic languages of Western Asia. The others are the still-spoken Aramaic and the now-extinct Ugaritic and Amorite languages. These closely related languages originated in the Levant and Upper Mesopotamia. Ancient Semitic-speaking peoples spoke them in an area encompassing what is today Israel, Palestine, Jordan, the Sinai Peninsula, Lebanon, Syria, as well as some areas of southwestern Turkey, Iraq, and the northwestern corner of Saudi Arabia. From the 9th century BCE, they also spread to the Iberian Peninsula, Malta, Sicily and North Africa in the form of Phoenician.

Historical Canaanite speakers included groups such as the Israelites, Ammonites, Edomites, Phoenicians, Moabites and Philistines. The Canaanite languages continued to be spoken languages until at least the 5th century CE but were gradually supplanted by Aramaic, a language which gained influence as the lingua franca of the Neo-Assyrian Empire and succeeding Neo-Babylonian and Achaemenid Empires, as well as a number of other states such as the Palmyrene Empire.

Many Jews used Mishnaic Hebrew well into the Middle Ages and up to the present day as both a liturgical and literary language, and they also employed it as a lingua franca for commerce between disparate diasporic communities. Samaritan Hebrew remained a liturgical language among Samaritans.

Modern Hebrew is the only living Canaanite language today and was revived in the 19th century by political and cultural activists as an everyday spoken language. This was achieved mainly through the revitalization and cultivation efforts of Zionists throughout Europe and in Palestine. By the mid-20th century, Modern Hebrew had become the primary language of Palestinian Jews and was later made the official language of the State of Israel.

== Classification ==
Analogous to Serbo-Croatian, the Canaanite dialects operate on a spectrum of mutual intelligibility with one another, with significant overlap occurring in syntax, morphology, phonology, and semantics. This family of languages also has the distinction of being the first historically attested group of languages to use an alphabet, derived from the Proto-Canaanite alphabet, to record their writings, as opposed to the far earlier Cuneiform logographic/syllabic writing of the region, which originated in Mesopotamia and was used to record Sumerian, Akkadian (aka Assyrian and Babylonian), Eblaite, Elamite, Hurrian, Aramaic, Hittite and Old Persian.

In contrast to the Egyptians, the Bronze-Age Canaanites did not write extensively in their native language, nor in sophisticated expressive purposes like history, law codes or stories being documented.

Nonetheless, their inscriptions are heavily attested to throughout the Levant, Mesopotamia, Anatolia, Northern Arabian Peninsula and the Eastern Mediterranean, and after the founding of Carthage by Phoenician colonists, in coastal regions of North Africa and Iberian Peninsula also. Dialects have been labelled primarily with reference to Biblical geography: Hebrew (Israelian, Judean/Biblical, Samaritan), Phoenician/Punic, Amorite, Ammonite, Moabite, Sutean and Edomite; the dialects were all mutually intelligible, being no more differentiated than geographical varieties of Modern English.

The Canaanite languages or dialects can be split into the following:

=== North Canaan ===
- Philistine – attested by several dozen inscriptions in Phoenician script scattered along Israel's southwest coast, in particular the Ekron Royal Dedicatory Inscription. It is noted as being similar to Phoenician, in particular the Byblian dialect.
- Phoenician – The main sources are the Ahiram sarcophagus inscription, the sarcophagus of Eshmunazar II, the Tabnit sarcophagus, the Kilamuwa Stela, the Cippi of Melqart, and the other Byblian royal inscriptions. There were two main dialects of Phoenician, with Byblian being confined to Byblos, and Tyro-Sidonian being spread as Phoenician settlements were founded along the Mediterranean. Tyro-Sidonian is further split into eastern and western dialects, the latter being that from which the Punic language would emerge. For later Punic: in Plautus' play Poenulus at the beginning of the fifth act.

=== South Canaan ===
- Ammonite – an extinct Canaanite dialect of the Ammonite people mentioned in the Bible. The main sources are the Amman Citadel Inscription and Tel Siran inscription.
- Edomite – an extinct Canaanite dialect of the Edomite people mentioned in the Bible and in Assyrian, Babylonian, Egyptian, Greek and Roman texts.
- Hebrew – the only Canaanite language that is a living language, and the most successful example of a revived dead language hitherto only used for liturgical purposes.
- Moabite – an extinct Canaanite dialect of the Moabite people mentioned in the Bible and Assyrian and Egyptian texts. The main sources are the Mesha Stele and El-Kerak Stela.

=== Other ===
Other possible Canaanite languages:

- Eblaite (formerly), when it was first discovered in the 1970s epigraphers had classified it as "Paleo-Canaanite" or "Old Canaanite". However, subsequent linguistic scholarship after those years place it firmly as an East Semitic language.
- Ugaritic is also a closely related Northwest Semitic language of the northern Levant, but likely not Canaanitic.
- The Deir Alla inscription, written in a dialect with both Aramaic and South Canaanitic characteristics, which is classified as Canaanite in Hetzron.
- Sutean, a Semitic language, possibly of the Canaanite branch.
- Amarna Canaanite – attested only through the Canaano-Akkadian language of the Amarna letters. Hetzron notes that it has distinctive features that mark it as a separate language from the other Canaanite dialects rather than a direct ancestor to any of them.
- In 2022, two large, 3,800-year-old, Amorite-Akkadian bilingual tablets were published, yielding a large corpus of Northwest Semitic in Assyria and Babylonia. The Amorite text in the tablet showed very close relationship to Canaanite languages. Until then, Amorite was only known from personal names attested in Akkadian language Assyrian and Babylonian texts and its position within Northern Semitic languages was vague.
- The Byblos syllabary corpus, directly preceding Phoenician alphabet inscriptions in palimpsests may have also been used to write an ancient Canaanite language such as Phoenician.

== Comparison to Aramaic ==
Some distinctive typological features of Canaanite in relation to the still spoken Aramaic are:

- The prefix h- is the definite article (Aramaic has a postfixed -a), which seems to be an innovation of Canaanite.
- The first person pronoun is ʼnk (אנכ anok(i), which is similar to Akkadian, Ancient Egyptian and Berber, versus Aramaic ʾnʾ/ʾny.
- The change of *ā > ō, called the Canaanite shift.

== Descendants ==
Modern Hebrew, revived in the modern era from an extinct dialect of the ancient Israelites preserved in literature, poetry, liturgy; Biblical Hebrew, also known as Classical Hebrew, the oldest form of the language attested in writing. The original pronunciation of Biblical Hebrew is accessible only through reconstruction. It may also include Samaritan Hebrew, a variety formerly spoken by the Samaritans. The main sources of Classical Hebrew are the Hebrew Bible and inscriptions such as the Gezer calendar and Khirbet Qeiyafa ostracon.

Slightly varying forms of Hebrew preserved from the first millennium BC until modern times include:

- Mishnaic Hebrew – used by Jews as a secondary language and a liturgical, poetical, and rabbinical lingua franca, as recorded in the Mishnah and Talmud and other writings; a direct descendant of and development from Classical Hebrew, starting with the shift towards using Aramaic as the vernacular (c. 1st century CE)
- Tiberian Hebrew – a medieval reading and vocalization tradition for Biblical Hebrew developed by Masoretic scholars living in the Jewish community of Tiberias in Palestine (c. 750–950).
- Medieval Hebrew – used by Jews as a liturgical, poetical, rabbinical, scientific, and literary lingua franca; the direct descendant of Mishnaic Hebrew, which began when Mishnaic Hebrew ceased to be an everyday spoken language (c. 5th century CE)
- Mizrahi Hebrew – liturgical pronunciation system for Hebrew used by Mizrahi Jews
- Yemenite Hebrew – liturgical pronunciation system for Hebrew used by Yemenite Jews
- Sephardi Hebrew – liturgical pronunciation system for Hebrew used by Sephardi Jews
- Ashkenazi Hebrew – liturgical pronunciation system for Hebrew used by Ashkenazi Jews
- Maskilic Hebrew – used by Jews as a scientific, literary and journalistic language during the Haskalah, based on Biblical Hebrew enriched with neologisms created by writers and journalists
- Modern Hebrew - used in Israel today as a spoken vernacular and living language after being revived during the Haskalah.
- Samaritan Hebrew – used by Samaritans as a liturgical language

All of the other Canaanite languages seem to have become extinct by the early first millennium CE except Punic, which survived into late antiquity (or possibly even longer). The Phoenician and Punic expansion spread the Phoenician language and the Punic variety spoken in the antique-era colonies across the Western Mediterranean, but there too it died out, although it seems to have survived longer than in Phoenicia itself.

== Sources ==
The primary modern reference book for the many extra-biblical Canaanite inscriptions, together with Aramaic inscriptions, is the German-language book Kanaanäische und Aramäische Inschriften which draws together a large corpus of written material from Levant, Mesopotamia and Anatolia, from which inscriptions are often referenced as KAI n (for a number n).

== See also ==
- Ancient Hebrew writings
- Canaanite and Aramaic inscriptions
- Canaanite ivory comb
- Canaanite religion
- Classification of Semitic languages
- Northwest Semitic languages
- Proto-Canaanite alphabet
- Shibboleth

== Bibliography ==
- The Semitic Languages. Routledge Language Family Descriptions. Edited by Robert Hetzron. New York: Routledge, 1997.
- Garnier, Romain; Jacques, Guillaume (2012). "A neglected phonetic law: The assimilation of pretonic yod to a following coronal in North-West Semitic". Bulletin of the School of Oriental and African Studies. 75 (1): 135–145. CiteSeerX 10.1.1.395.1033. doi:10.1017/s0041977x11001261. S2CID 16649580.
- Rendsburg, Gary (1997). "Ancient Hebrew Phonology". Phonologies of Asia and Africa: Including the Caucasus. Eisenbrauns. ISBN 978-1-57506-019-4.
- Waltke, Bruce K.; O'Connor, M. (1990). An Introduction to Biblical Hebrew Syntax. Winona Lake, Indiana: Eisenbrauns. ISBN 978-0-931464-31-7.
