= Jan van Assen =

Dutch painter

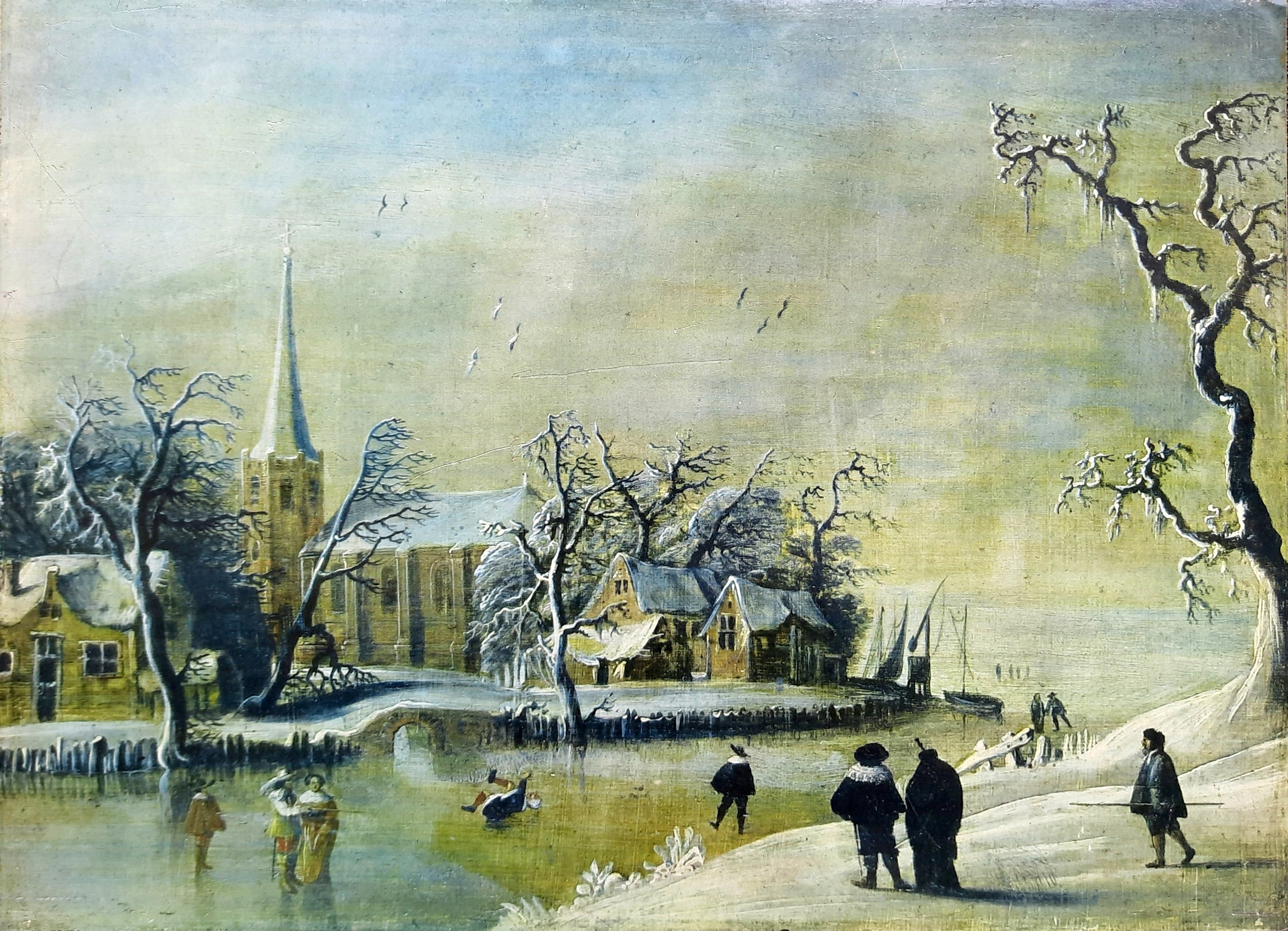
Winter landscape, Jan van Assen, National Museum, Poznań

Jan van Assen (1635, Amsterdam – 1695) was a painter of history, portraits, and landscape in the Italian manner. He studied particularly the works of Tempesta. He died at his birthplace in 1695.
