= Hetzron =

Hetzron may refer to:

- Hezron, a name which occurs several times in the Hebrew Bible.
- Robert Hetzron (1937–1997), linguist
