= Canaanite ivory comb =

Ancient Canaanite artifact, c. 1700 BC

Ivory lice comb
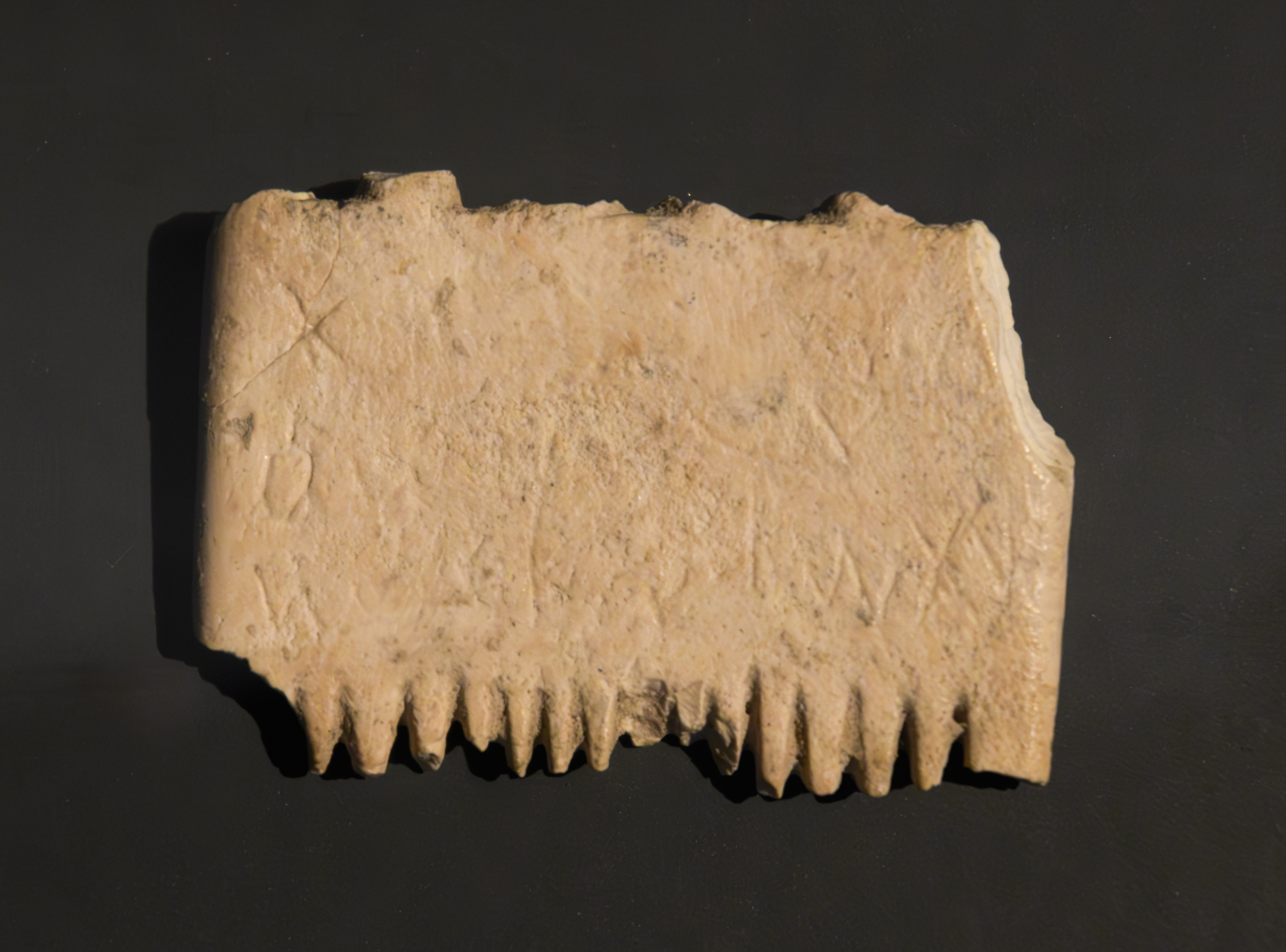
- Type: Tool
- Material: Elephant ivory
- Size: 3.5 by 2.5 centimetres (1.38 by 0.98 in)
- Writing: Early Canaanite
- Created: 1700 BC
- Discovered: 2016; Tel Lachish
- Discovered by: Archaeologists from the Hebrew University of Jerusalem & Southern Adventist University

The Canaanite Ivory Comb is a 3,700-year-old artifact discovered in the ruins of Lachish, an ancient Canaanite city-state located in modern-day Israel. Measuring approximately 3.5 by 2.5 centimetres (1.38 by 0.98 in), the comb is made of elephant ivory and contains the earliest known complete sentence written in a phonetic alphabet. The inscription, carved in an early Canaanite script, reads, "May this tusk root out the lice of the hair and the beard". The comb was unearthed in 2016 but the inscription was identified in 2021. The artifact provided insights into daily life, personal hygiene, and early literacy among the Canaanites, making it an important discovery in the study of ancient civilizations and the development of alphabetic writing systems.

== Discovery and context ==
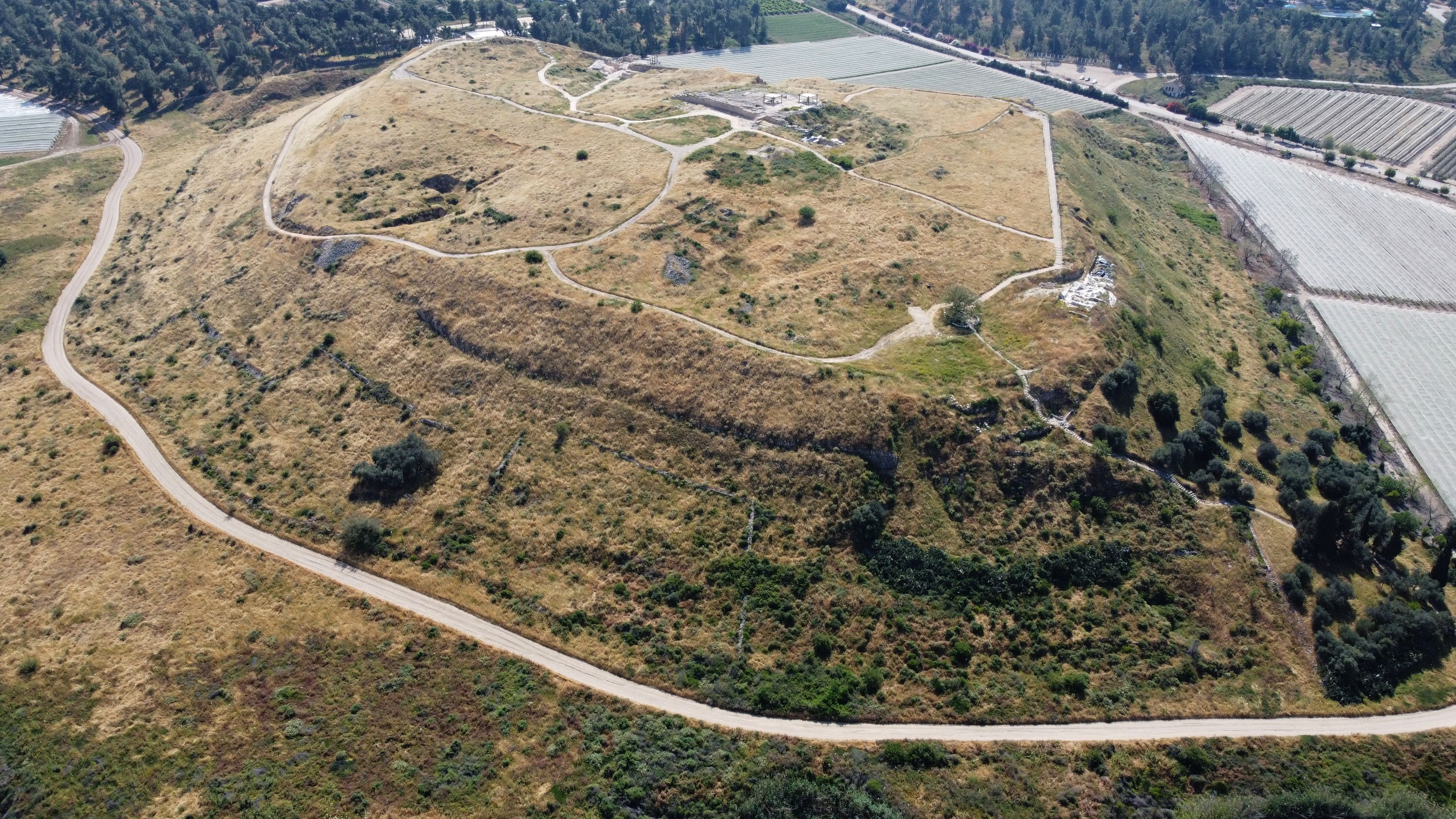
Aerial view of the excavation site at Tel Lachish

The ivory comb was excavated from Tel Lachish, a site that was once a major Canaanite city-state during the second millennium BC. Lachish held strategic and economic importance, second only to Jerusalem within the Judean kingdom in later periods. The comb was initially overlooked and categorized among miscellaneous artifacts due to its worn condition and lack of visible markings. Years after its initial discovery, researchers under the leadership of Yosef Garfinkel and Michael G. Hasel with the Hebrew University of Jerusalem conducted a closer examination of the comb and identified a faint inscription on one side of the artifact.

The comb is believed to date to around 1700 BC and was likely imported from Egypt, as elephants did not inhabit Canaan during that period. This suggests that the comb was a luxury item, affordable only to the wealthier classes of Canaanite society.

== Description ==
External image
- Image of the comb photographed Dafna Gazit for the Israel Antiquities Authority

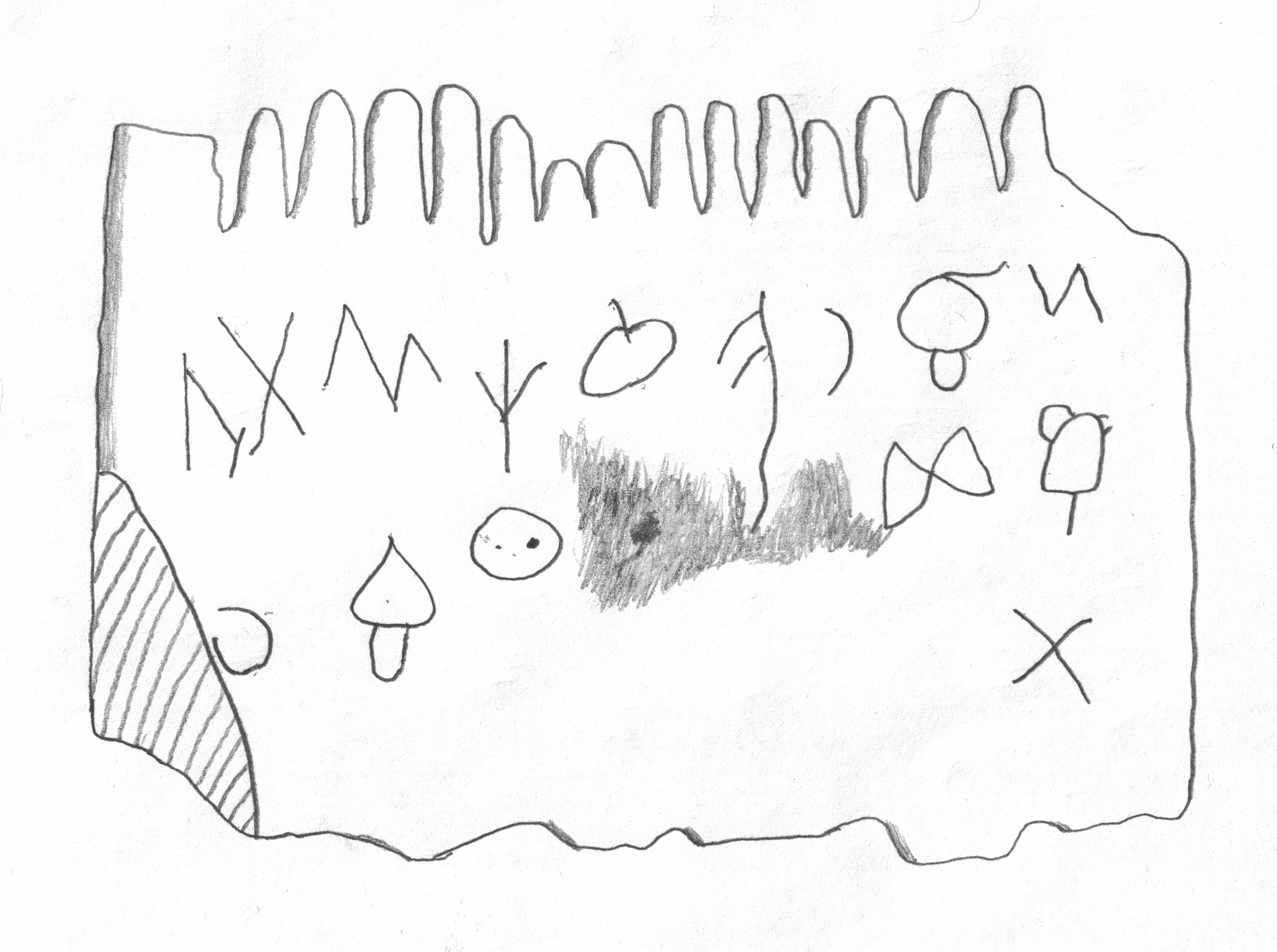
A sketch of the comb showing the inscription

The comb is dual-sided, with one set of teeth designed for disentangling hair and another set with finer teeth intended for removing lice and nits (their eggs). While some of the teeth have broken off, the overall design resembles modern louse combs. Microscopic analysis of the comb's teeth revealed traces of a louse, affirming its function as a louse removal tool. The artifact's wear and the erosion on its surface likely resulted from repeated handling, further confirming its use in grooming practices.

The inscription on the comb, composed of 17 tiny letters in Canaanite script, forms the earliest known complete sentence in a phonetic alphabet. The sentence reads: "May this tusk root out the lice of the hair and the beard". This discovery is particularly notable as it represents a shift towards alphabetic writing systems, where individual letters represent sounds. Unlike older writing systems, such as Egyptian hieroglyphs and Mesopotamian cuneiform, which used hundreds of symbols to represent words or syllables, the Canaanite alphabet allowed for a simpler, more accessible form of writing. The alphabetic system used on the comb is considered a precursor to the Phoenician alphabet, which later influenced Greek, Latin, and other modern alphabets.

The inscription's focus on a practical, personal matter, removing lice, stands out from other ancient inscriptions, which commonly emphasize royal achievements, religious dedications, or military victories. This inscription demonstrates that even the upper classes of Canaanite society dealt with common challenges like lice infestations. The script, while primitive compared to later alphabets, suggests that writing was not only used for official or ceremonial purposes but also had practical applications in daily life. The skill required to engrave such fine letters, some as small as 1 to 3 millimetres (0.039 to 0.118 in), indicates a high level of craftsmanship and literacy.

The Canaanites are historically documented in various sources, including Egyptian texts, the Hebrew Bible, and Akkadian tablets, but few of their own written records survive. The comb provides one of the most direct pieces of evidence for Canaanite literacy and the use of a phonetic alphabet in daily life. As one of the earliest known examples of alphabetic writing, it highlights the origins of a system that would eventually influence the development of written language across Europe, the Middle East, and beyond.

== See also ==
- Phoenician alphabet – An evolution of the Canaanite script, which influenced Greek and Latin alphabets.
- Proto-Canaanite alphabet
- Proto-Sinaitic script
