= Proto-Canaanite alphabet =

Writing system

Proto-Canaanite is the name given to:

1. The Proto-Sinaitic script when found in Canaan, dating to about the 17th century BC and later.
2. A hypothetical ancestor of the Phoenician script before some cut-off date, typically 1050 BC, with an undefined affinity to Proto-Sinaitic. No extant "Phoenician" inscription is older than 1000 BC. The Phoenician, Hebrew, and other Canaanite dialects were largely indistinguishable before that time.

About 20–25 Proto-Canaanite inscriptions are known.

== Name ==
Proto-Canaanite, also referred to as Proto-Canaan, Old Canaanite, or Canaanite, is the name given to either a script ancestral to the Phoenician or Paleo-Hebrew script with undefined affinity to Proto-Sinaitic, or to the Proto-Sinaitic script (c. 16th century BC), when found in Canaan.

While no extant inscription in the Phoenician alphabet is older than c. 1050 BC, Proto-Canaanite is used for the early alphabets as used during the 13th and 12th centuries BC in Phoenicia. However, the Phoenician, Hebrew, and other Canaanite dialects were largely indistinguishable before the 11th century BC, and the writing system is essentially identical.

== History and development ==
According to Finkelstein and Sass (2013), based on archeological contexts of inscriptions, the Proto-Canaanite alphabet spread and developed as follows. From the 13th to the mid-10th century BCE, the spread of the alphabet was restricted to the Shephelah. From the mid-10th to early 9th century BCE, the alphabet transitioned from Proto-Canaanite to ‘post Proto-Canaanite’. The alphabet also spread out of Philistia to the Beit She'an Valley and Phoenicia, but there still were not any recognizable regional variants. Between 880 and 830 BCE, the last Proto-Canaanite features disappear from the alphabet. A Hebrew variant of the alphabet can now be differentiated from a still uniform Philistian–Phoenician–Aramaic alphabet. Around 780-730 B.C.E., the "post Proto-Canaanite alphabet" has spread to the entire Levant. The Philistian, Phoenician, Aramaic and Ammonite variants of the alphabet have emerged. Furthermore, it is stated that because the Proto-Canaanite alphabet can only be found in Shephelah between the 13th century to the mid-10th century BCE, this region is to be regarded as the core area of the alphabet. The alphabet is not attested in Byblos and in the rest of Phoenicia before the late 10th century BCE. In 2022, an inscription in Proto-Canaanite alphabet found on a comb from 1700 BCE was deciphered. The Canaanite ivory comb was excavated in 2016 in Tel Lachish, an ancient Canaanite site located in the Shephelah. The comb contains multiple letters that are very similar to the letters of the Proto-Sinaitic script.

== Inscriptions ==
A possible example of Proto-Canaanite, the inscription on the Ophel pithos, was found in 2012 on a pottery storage jar during the excavations of the south wall of the Temple Mount by Israeli archaeologist Eilat Mazar in Jerusalem. Inscribed on the pot are some big letters about an inch high, of which only five are complete, and traces of perhaps three additional letters written in Proto-Canaanite script.

Another possible Proto-Canaanite inscription is the Khirbet Qeiyafa ostracon, a 15-by-16.5-centimetre (5.9 in × 6.5 in) ostracon believed to be the longest Proto-Canaanite inscription ever found.

Other inscriptions include the Lachish Dagger, Gezer Sherd, Schechem Plaque, Nagila Sherd, Izbet Sartah Ostracon, Raddana Handle, Revadim Seal, El-Khadr Arrowheads 1-5, and the Ahiram Sarcophagus.

== Table of symbols ==
Symbol	IPA	Reconstructed Name
	/ʔ/	'alp "ox"
	/b/	bayt "house"
	/ɡ/	gaml "throw-stick"
	/d/	dalt "door" / dilt "fish"
	/h/	haw "man-calling"?
	/w/	waw "hook"
	/z/	zayn "weapon" / ziqq "fetter"
	/ħ/	ḥayṭ "fence"?
	/tˤ/	ṭayt "wheel"
	/j/	yad "hand"
	/k/	kapp "palm"
	/l/	lamd "goad"
	/m/	maym "water"
	/n/	naḥš "snake"
	/s/	samk "support"
𐤏	/ʕ/	ʿayin "eye"
	/p/	pe "mouth"
	/kˤ/ or /q/	qup "monkey"
	/r/ or /ɾ/	ra'š "head"
? (Note: A glyph for ś has been found in the Canaanite Lachish Comb inscription, though no such glyph has been found in Proto-Sinaitic, and its origin has not been discovered.)	/ɬ/	?
	/θ/?~/ʃ/	šin? "tooth"
	/t/	taw "mark"

== See also ==
- Canaanite languages
- Deir Alla
- Paleo-Hebrew
