= Aasen =

Origin
- Language: Norwegian

Aasen is a Norwegian surname. Notable people with the surname include:

- Arne Paasche Aasen (1901–1978), Norwegian politician, journalist and poet
- Augusta Aasen (1878–1920), Norwegian politician
- Elisabeth Aasen (1922–2009), Norwegian politician
- Ivar Aasen (1813–1896), Norwegian philologist, lexicographer and writer
- John Aasen (1890–1938), American actor
- Liv Aasen (1928–2005), Norwegian politician
- Mats Zuccarello Aasen (born 1987), Norwegian ice hockey player
- Nils Waltersen Aasen (1878–1925), Norwegian arms inventor
- Otto Aasen (1894–1983), Norwegian Nordic skier
- Marianne Aasen (born 1967), Norwegian Labour politician

== See also ==
- Ivar Aasen-sambandet, Norwegian philological organisation
- Aas (surname)
