= Modern runic writing =

Modern use of runic alphabets

Runic alphabets have seen numerous uses since the 18th-century Viking revival, in Scandinavian Romantic nationalism (Gothicismus) and Germanic occultism in the 19th century, and in the context of the Fantasy genre and of Germanic Neopaganism in the 20th century.

== Early modern period and Viking Revival ==
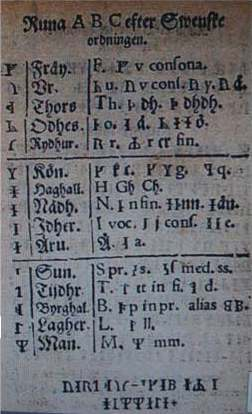
A page from the 1611 edition of Bure's Runa ABC.

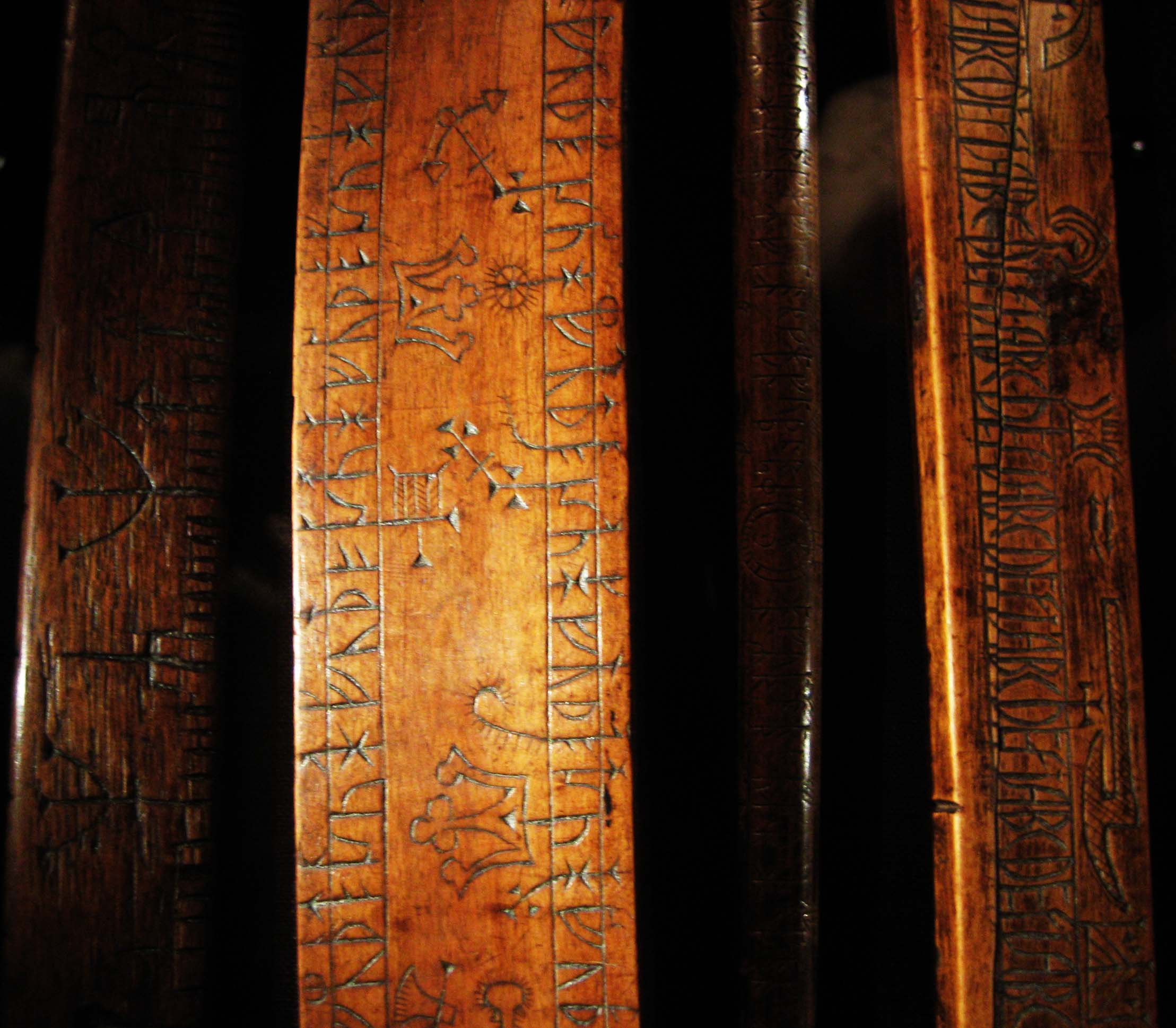
Rune staffs at the Museum of History in Lund, Sweden.

The use of medieval runes mostly disappears in the course of the 14th century. An exception are the Dalecarlian runes, which survived, heavily influenced by the Latin alphabet, into the 19th century. Occasional use of runes also seems to have persisted elsewhere, as evidenced by the 16th-century Faroer Fámjin stone.

Antiquarian interest in runes first arises in the 16th century, with the 1555 Historia de gentibus septentrionalibus by Olaus Magnus, and picks up in the 17th century, notably with Peder Resen's Edda Islandorum of 1665. In the 17th century, runology pioneer Johannes Bureus published his Runa ABC, the first Swedish alphabet book.

Runic calendars are perpetual calendar based on the 19-year-long Metonic cycle of the Moon. They may originate as early as in the 13th century, but most surviving examples date to the early modern period. Most of the several thousand which survive are wooden calendars date from the 16th century onward. Around 1800, such calendars were made in the form of tobacco boxes in brass.

== Esotericism ==
=== Germanic mysticism and völkisch symbolism ===
The pioneer of the Armanist branch of Ariosophy and one of the more important figures in esotericism in Germany and Austria in the late 19th and early 20th century was the Austrian occultist, mysticist, and völkisch author, Guido von List. In 1908, he published in Das Geheimnis der Runen ("The Secret of the Runes") a set of eighteen so-called "Armanen runes", which allegedly were revealed to him in a state of temporary blindness after cataract operations on both eyes in 1902.

Circular arrangement of the Armanen runes.

The first sixteen of von List's runes correspond to the sixteen Younger Futhark runes, with slight modifications in names (and partly mirrored shapes). The two additional runes are loosely inspired by the Anglo-Saxon Futhorc. The first sixteen are named Fa, Ur, Thurs, Os, Rit, Ka, Hagal, Nauth, Is, Ar, Sig, Tyr, Bar, Laf, Man, Yr. The final two are Eh (the name is from Anglo-Saxon Futhork, the shape like Younger Futhark Ar) and Gibor (the name similar to Anglo-Saxon Futhork Gyfu, but in shape similar to a Wolfsangel symbol).

Karl Maria Wiligut in 1934 developed a rune row loosely based on List's Armanen runes, even though Wiligut rejected List's runes and his overall philosophy. Wiligut claimed to have been initiated into "runic lore" by his grandfather Karl Wiligut (1794–1883). His rune row has 24 letters, like the Elder Futhark. Like von List's Armanen runes that are closely based on the Younger Futhark, many of Wiligut's runes are identical to historical runes, with some additions. The historical Futhark sequence is not preserved.

Wiligut's names for his runes are: Tel, Man, Kaun, Fa, Asa, Os, Eis, Not, Tor, Tyr, Laf, Rit, Thorn, Ur, Sig, Zil, Yr, Hag-Al, H, Wend-horn, Gibor, Eh, Othil, Bar-Bjork. Runes without direct precedent in the historical runes are Tel (a crossed ring, similar to the sun cross symbol), Tor (like a Latin T), Zil (like a rotated Latin Z), Gibor (taken from von List's runes). The shape of Wend-horn is similar to Tvimadur.

The use of runes in Germanic mysticism, notably List's "Armanen runes" and the derived "Wiligut runes" played a certain role in Nazi symbolism. The fascination with runic symbolism was mostly limited to Heinrich Himmler, and not shared by the other members of the Nazi top echelon. Consequently, runes appear mostly in insignia associated with the Schutzstaffel, the paramilitary organization led by Himmler. Wiligut is credited with designing the SS-Ehrenring, which displays a number of "Wiligut runes".

=== Contemporary esotericism and neopaganism ===
In German esotericism after 1945, List's Armanen runes became somewhat detached from its völkisch associations and became part of general "pansophical" or eclectic occultism, notably due to the publications by Karl Spiesberger. During the New Age boom of the 1980s, the Armanen runes may well have been more popularly known in Germany than the historical runes.

From the 1970s, a revival of interest in the historical runes developed in the emerging movements associated with Germanic neopaganism, and to a lesser extent in other forms of Neopaganism and New Age esotericism. Various systems of Runic divination have been published since the 1980s, notably by Ralph Blum (1982), Stephen Flowers (1984, onward), Stephan Grundy (1990), and Nigel Pennick (1995).

The Uthark theory, originally proposed as a scholarly hypothesis by Sigurd Agrell in 1932, was received in runic esotericism via Kenneth Meadows' Rune Power (1995) and Thomas Karlsson's Uthark: Nightside of the Runes (2002).

== Runestones ==
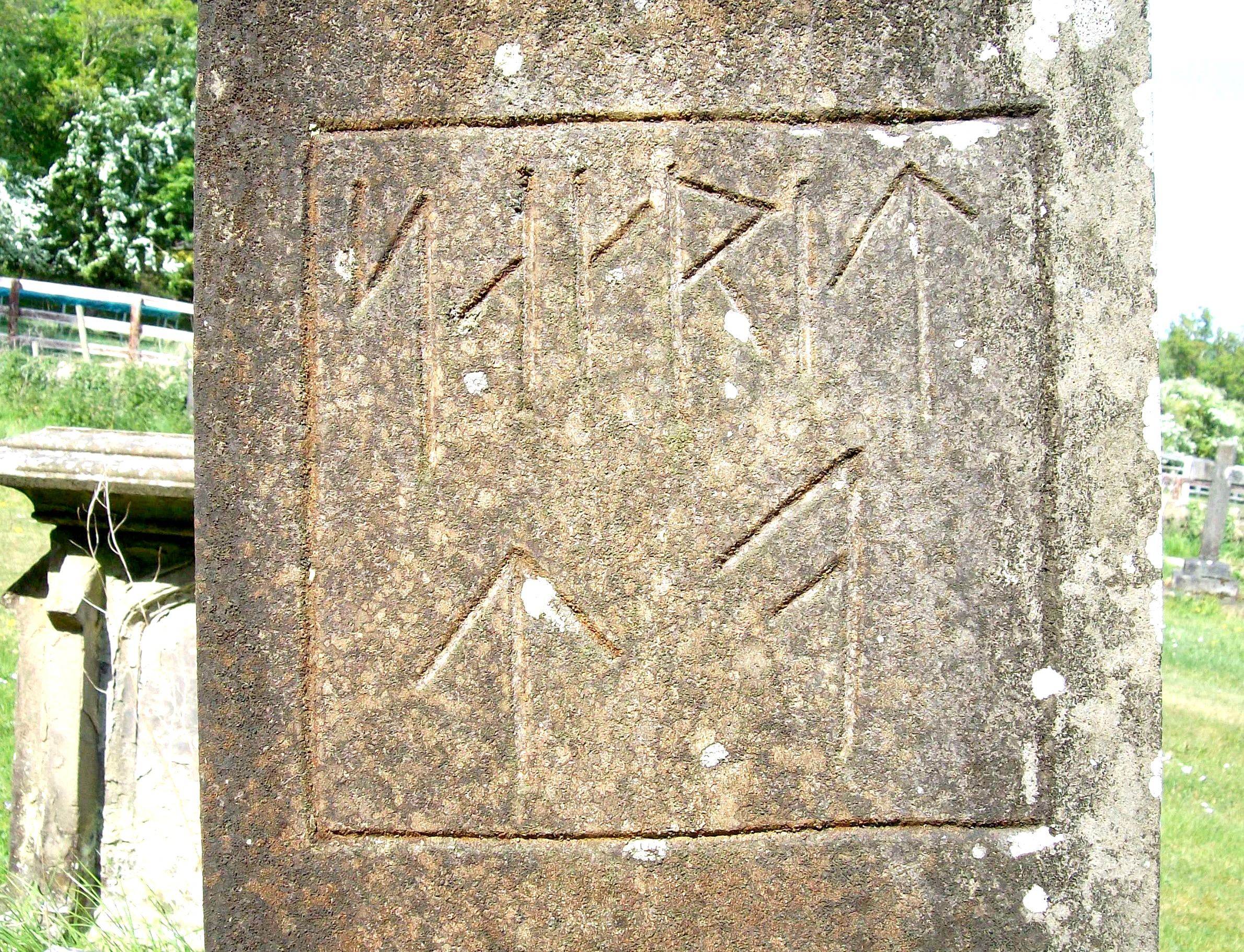
Runic script on an 1886 gravestone in Parkend, England. The inscription reads, "ᛋᛆᚴᚱᛁᛏ ᛏᚮ".

A number of notable runestones of modern origin exist. Some of them are intended as hoaxes, their creators attempting to imitate a Viking Age artefact. This mostly concerns the American runestones, such as the Kensington runestone or the Oklahoma runestones.

Especially since the late 20th century, runestones in the style of the Viking Age were also made without pretense of authenticity, either as independent works of art or as replicas as museum exhibits or tourist attractions.

== J. R. R. Tolkien ==
In J. R. R. Tolkien's novel The Hobbit (1937), the Anglo-Saxon runes are used on a map to emphasize its connection to the Dwarves. They also were used in the initial drafts of The Lord of the Rings, but later were replaced by the Cirth rune-like alphabet invented by Tolkien.

Tolkien's mode of writing Modern English in Anglo-Saxon runes received explicit recognition with the introduction of three extra runes to the Unicode Runic block used by him in Unicode version 7.0 (2014). The three characters represent the English k, oo and sh graphemes, as follows:

- RUNIC LETTER K (ᛱ, U+16F1), a variant of cen ᚳ
- RUNIC LETTER SH (ᛲ, U+16F2), a mirrored variant of the s rune ᛋ
- RUNIC LETTER OO (ᛳ, U+16F3), similar to the "lantern rune" or ger ᛄ

The k rune was published with The Hobbit (1937), e.g. for writing Tolkien's own name, as ᛁ ᚱ ᚱ ᛏᚩᛚᛱᛁᛖᚾ. His oo and sh runes are known from a postcard written to Katherine Farrer on 30 November 1947, published as no. 112 in The Letters of J. R. R. Tolkien (1981).

Tolkien's mode for writing Modern English is mostly based on orthography, transcribing each letter, with a few special runes used for frequent digraphs, as follows:

grapheme	a	b	c	d	e	ea	ee	eo	f	g	h	i, j	k	l	m	n	ng	o oa	oo	p	qu	r	s	sh	st	t	th	u, v	w	x	y	z
rune	ᚫ, ᚪ, ᚩ	ᛒ	ᚳ	ᛞ	ᛖ	ᛠ	ᛟ	ᛇ	ᚠ	ᚷ	ᚻ	ᛁ	ᛱ	ᛚ	ᛗ	ᚾ	ᛝ	ᚩ	ᛳ	ᛈ	ᚳᚹ	ᚱ	ᛋ	ᛲ	ᛥ	ᛏ	ᚦ	ᚢ	ᚹ	ᛉ, ᛡ	ᚣ	ᛣ

== See also ==
- List of runestones
- Pseudo-runes
