= SS runes =

Insignia based on runes used by the Nazi paramilitary group

The SS runes with names

SS runes as featured on the SS-Ehrenring

SS runes (German: SS-Runen) is a generic name given to a collection of pseudo-runes used by the Schutzstaffel (SS), from the 1920s to 1945, for Nazi-occultism purposes. SS runes were featured on flags, uniforms and other items as symbols of various aspects of Nazi ideology and Germanic mysticism. They also represented virtues seen as desirable in SS members and were based on völkisch mystic Guido von List's pseudo-runic Armanen runes, which he loosely based on the historical runic alphabets; however, the SS runes also included other esoteric symbols not borrowed from Armanen runes. Post–World War II, these insignia continue to be used by neo-Nazi individuals and groups.

== SS runes ==
Image	Name	Meaning	Description
	Hakenkreuz	Aryan Nationalism	The Hakenkreuz ("hook-cross") or swastika symbolised nationality and was used by the SS as an extension of its state use.
	Sonnenrad	The Germanic Sun God	Main article: Black Sun (symbol) The Sonnenrad ("sunwheel") or Black Sun represented the Germanic pagan sun god. It consists of a swastika with its hooks swung inwards to make it round. Its esoteric symbology remains unknown.
	Sig-Rune	Victory	The Sig-Rune ("Victory rune") or Siegrune symbolised "victory" (Sieg). The historic ᛋ-rune (on which the Siegrune was based) was named "sun" (see Sowilo), however, von List reinterpreted it as a victory sign when he compiled his list of "Armanen runes". The Siegrune was adapted into the emblem of the SS in 1933 by Walter Heck, an SS Sturmhauptführer who worked as a graphic designer for Ferdinand Hoffstatter, a producer of emblems and insignia in Bonn. Heck's device consisted of two sig runes drawn side by side like lightning bolts (ᛋᛋ; thus sometimes called "SS lightning-bolt runes" and thereof), and was soon adopted by all branches of the SS – though Heck himself received only a token payment of 2.5 Reichsmarks for his work. The "double Siegrune" had a double meaning: as well as standing for the initials of the SS, it could be read as a rallying cry of "Victory, Victory!" The symbol became so ubiquitous that it was frequently typeset using runes rather than letters; during the Nazi period, an extra key was added to German typewriters to enable them to type the double-sig logo with a single keystroke.
	Doppelte Sig-Rune	Schutzstaffel	
	Ger-Rune	Communal spirit	The Ger-Rune ("spear") was used to symbolise the communitarian ideal of the SS. The 11th SS Volunteer Panzergrenadier Division "Nordland", a Waffen-SS unit, adopted the rune as a variant of its divisional insignia.
	Wolfsangel	Liberty and independence	Main article: Wolfsangel The Wolfsangel ("wolf hook") was used as a heraldic symbol alluding to a wolf trap, and is still found on the municipal arms of a number of German towns and cities. It was adopted by a fifteenth-century peasants' uprising, thus acquiring an association with liberty and independence. The Nazi Party adopted the symbol during its early years and it was subsequently widely used by the SS, including by units such as the 2nd SS Panzer Division ("Das Reich"). A variant of the Wolfsangel was used by the Weer Afdeelingen, the paramilitary wing of the National Socialist Movement in the Netherlands and the 34th SS Volunteer Grenadier Division ("Landstorm Nederland"), which were raised from Dutch Nazis and the 4th SS Polizei Panzergrenadier Division.
	Wolfsangel (squat)	Liberty and independence	
	Opfer-Rune	Sacrifice	The Opfer-Rune ("sacrifice"), analogous to the Eif-Rune, is a rotated version of the Eihwaz rune (ᛇ) – preceded the Nazis, as it was first adopted after 1918 by Der Stahlhelm war veterans' movement that eventually merged with the Sturmabteilung (SA). The symbol was adopted by the Nazis after 1923 to commemorate the party members who died in Adolf Hitler's failed Beer Hall Putsch.
	Eif-Rune	Zeal/enthusiasm	The Eif-Rune ("zeal/enthusiasm"), analoguous to the Opfer-Rune, is a rotated and reflected version of the Eihwaz rune (ᛇ). During the early years of the SS it was used by Adolf Hitler's personal adjutants, such as Rudolf Hess.
	Leben-Rune	Life	Main article: Lebensrune The Leben-Rune ("life rune"), also known as the Lebensrune, was based on the upright Algiz rune ᛉ and was used by the Lebensborn, the SS body responsible for the Lebensborn programme which supported the "racially, biologically, and hereditarily valuable families" of SS members and other "Aryans". This interpretation of the "man" rune is not based on von List, but it occurs as early as the 1920s in the literature of Germanic mysticism, and it came to be widely used within the Nazi Party and Nazi Germany, e.g. in official prescriptions for the various uniforms of the Sturmabteilung. The upright version came to be seen as the "life rune", the downturned version the "death rune" (Todesrune). During the World War II era, these two runes (ᛉ for "born", ᛦ for "died") came to be used in obituaries and on tombstones as marking birth and death dates, replacing asterisk and cross symbols (* for "born", † for "died") conventionally used in this context in Germany.
	Toten-Rune	Death	Main article: Todesrune The Toten-Rune ("death rune") or Todesrune (also just Tot) is the inverted version of the Lebensrune ("life rune"). It was based on the downturned Algiz rune (ᛣ), which existed in Elder Futhark as a stylistic choice, later becoming the Norse standard, being renamed in Younger Futhark as Ýr, meaning "yew". It was used by the SS to represent death on documents and grave markers in place of the more conventional cross (†) symbol used for such purposes.
	Tyr-Rune	Leadership in battle	The Tyr-Rune followed the design of the Tiwaz rune (ᛏ) which was named after Týr, a god in Germanic paganism sometimes associated with war. Based on the link between the historical rune and battle, the SS developed the idea of the insignia as the "Kampf" or battle rune, symbolising military leadership. The SS commonly used it in place of the Christian cross on the grave markers of its members. It was also used by graduates of the SA Reichsführerschule, which trained SS officers until 1934; they wore it on their upper-left arms. It was adopted as an emblem by the 32nd SS Volunteer Grenadier Division "30 Januar", which was assembled from the members of SS schools in January 1945, as well as by the SS Recruitment and Training Department.
	Heilszeichen	Prosperity	The Heilszeichen ("whole symbol") appeared on the SS death's-head ring and were used to symbolise good fortune and success.
	Hagall-Rune	Faith in Nazism	Main article: Hagal (Armanen rune) The Hagall-Rune (borrowed from the Armanen runes) was widely used in the SS for its symbolic representation of "unshakeable faith" in Nazi philosophy, as Himmler put it. It was used in SS weddings as well as on the SS-Ehrenring (death's head ring) worn by members of the SS. The rune was also used as division insignia of the 6th SS Mountain Division Nord. It is roughly similar to the Haglaz rune (ᚼ) of the Younger Futhark, which stood for "hail", but it was modified by von List for his Armanen runes. List considered it to be the "mother rune" of his runic alphabet and envisaged it as a representation of a hexagonal crystal.
	Odal-Rune	Kinship, family, and blood unity	Main article: Odal (SS rune) The Odal-Rune was used by the SS to symbolise several values of central importance to Nazi ideology. It was based on the Elder Futhark othala rune (ᛟ), with further addition of "feet" or "serifs". During the World War II it was used by the 7th SS Volunteer Mountain Division Prinz Eugen and the 23rd SS Volunteer Panzergrenadier Division "Nederland", as well as the SS Race and Settlement Main Office, which was responsible for maintaining the racial purity of the SS.

== See also ==
- Nazi symbolism
- Occultism in Nazism
