= Z with stroke =

Letter of the Latin alphabet

Z with a stroke
- Ƶ ƶ
- Ż, J, Z

Usage
- Writing system: Latin
- Type: alphabetic
- Sound values: [ʒ]; [ʐ]; [d͡ʒ]
- In Unicode: U+01B5, U+01B6

History
Development
Z4
        - Ζ ζ
          - 𐌆
            - Z z
              - Ƶ ƶ
- Transliterations: Ь
- Variations: Ż, J, Z

Other
- Writing direction: left-to-right

Ƶ (minuscule: ƶ), called Z with stroke, is a letter of the Latin alphabet derived from Z, with the addition of a stroke through the center.

== Use in alphabets ==
Ƶ was used in a range of alphabets developed within the Soviet Union during the 1920s and 1930s. Soviet authorities sought a policy of Latinisation in the Soviet Union, replacing or developing scripts for minority languages within the USSR. Latin letters were chosen as the basis for these scripts in part to avoid the overt Russification that a Cyrillic writing system would represent, and to include both consonants and vowels in the written forms, unlike the Arabic abjad that was already in use for some of these languages.

One such Soviet Latin-script writing system was the Jaꞑalif alphabet, also known as the New Turkic Alphabet. Ƶ is used in writing Tatar, Bashkir, and Karachay-Balkar in Jaꞑalif. This letter represents a voiced postalveolar fricative (IPA: [ʒ]) in these languages. Modern Latin-based scripts for these languages now use ⟨j⟩ for this sound, and modern Cyrillic scripts use ⟨ж⟩.

Another Soviet Latin script from this time was the Unified Northern Alphabet, designed for minority languages in the northern portions of the USSR. This alphabet also included the letter ƶ, though it was only used for writing Kildin Sámi in the Kola Peninsula, and Aleut in the Soviet Far East.

The 1931–1941 Mongolian Latin alphabet used Ƶ to represent a voiced postalveolar affricate (IPA: [d͡ʒ]).

Ƶ was used in the 1992 Latin Chechen spelling as voiced postalveolar fricative (IPA: [ʒ]). It was also used in a 1931 variant of the Karelian alphabet for the Tver dialect.

It is used in Unifon, being the last letter representing the voiced alveolar fricative (IPA: /z/).

It was also used in the Latin script for the Abkhaz language representing the voiced retroflex fricative (IPA: [ʐ]). It represents the same sound in the Polish alphabet, remaining in active usage by some as an alternative for the letter Ż (called "Z with overdot"). However, only the latter glyph is considered standard and is taught in Polish schools to children.

One early meeting on Hanyu Pinyin agreed to abbreviate ⟨zh / ch sh⟩ by using barred ⟨z / c / s⟩; this was never put into practice.

A stroke is sometimes added to the middle of a ⟨z⟩ character as an orthographic variant of the plain Z letter, primarily to distinguish it in handwriting from the numeral two ⟨2⟩ (see "Allographic variant" section below).

== Gallery ==
Polish Straż Miejska badge, general pattern

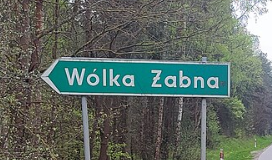
Wólka Żabna

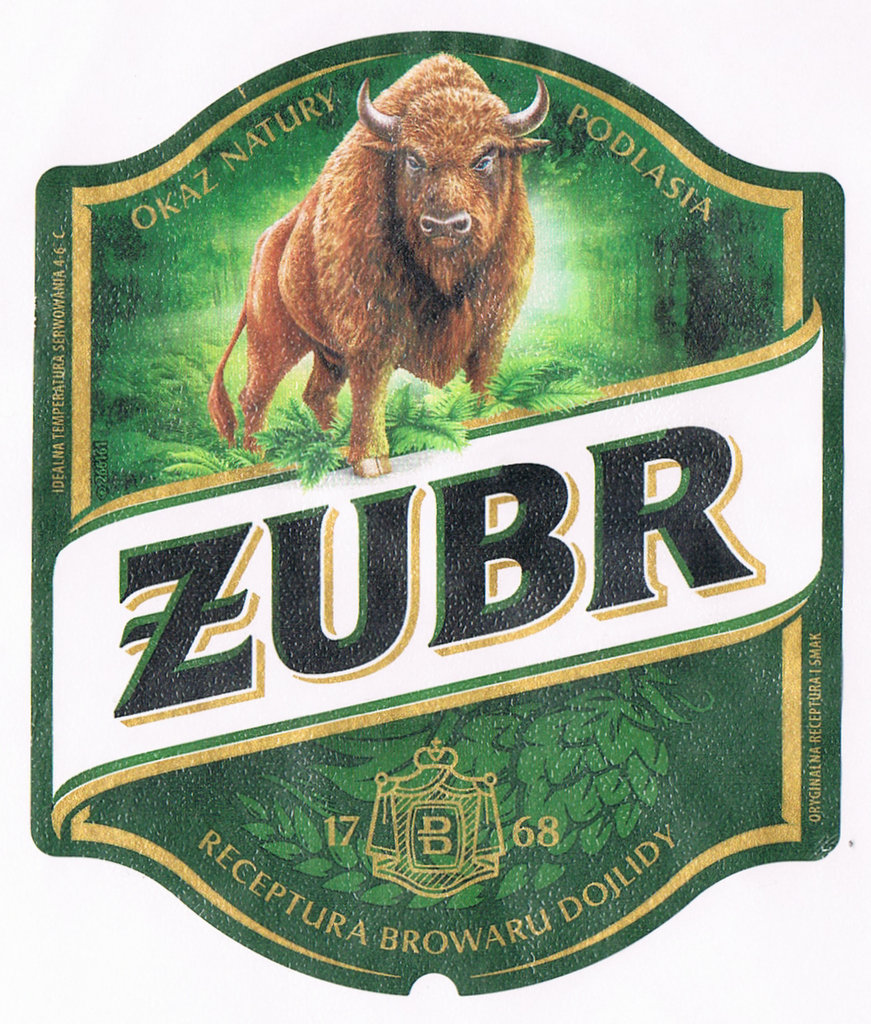
Żubr beer logo

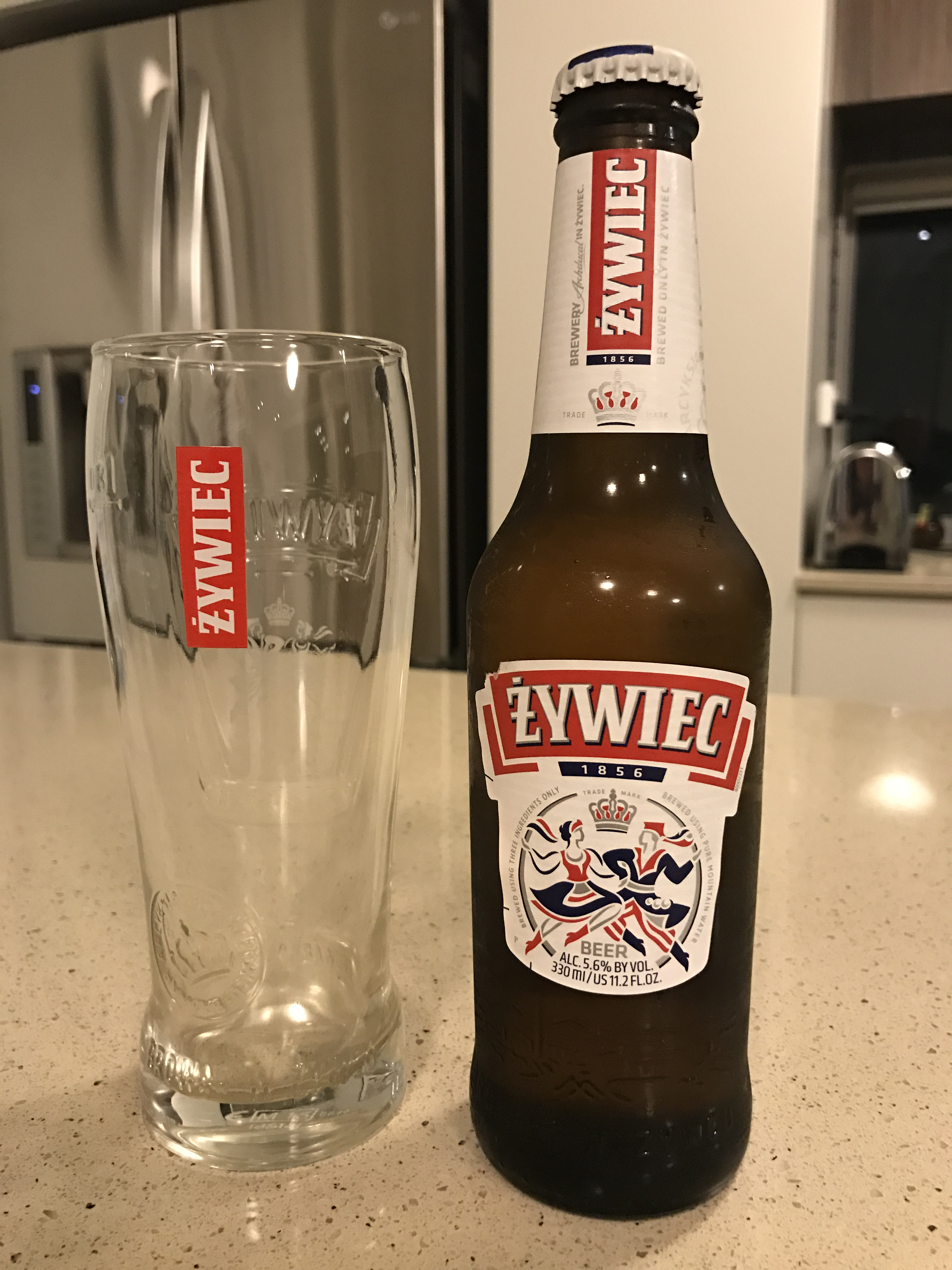
Żywiec beer logo

Žatec Brewery logo

Coat of arms of Zeilsheim

Coat of arms of Zittau

Coat of arms of Znojmo

Coat of arms of Gmina Żary

Coat of arms of Żukowo

== Use in heraldry ==
The Ƶ character is similar to the vertical form of the Wolfsangel (German for "wolf trap") heraldic charge from medieval Germany and eastern France.

The Wolfsangel symbol was an early 15th-century symbol of Germanic liberty and freedom that also appears as a mason's mark and was also used as a German medieval forestry boundary marker. The Wolfsangel symbol uses the mostly, but not exclusively, reversed Ƶ character in both horizontal and vertical forms, and in heraldry, the vertical form is associated with a Donnerkeil (or "thunderbolt").

Vertical form of the Wolfsangel hearaldic charge

Municipal arms of Oestrich-Winkel

Municipal arms of Marpingen

Municipal arms of Eppelborn

=== Appropriation by Nazis ===
4th SS PP Div.

In World War 2, the Wolfsangel symbol was appropriated into Nazi symbolism by both military and non-military groups and now remains listed as a hate symbol by the Anti-Defamation League database. In 2020, a trend started of Generation Z users of TikTok tattooing a "Generation Ƶ" symbol on their arm as "a symbol of unity in our generation but also as a sign of rebellion" (in the manner of the 15th-century Germanic peasant's revolts), however, the originator of the trend renounced it when the appropriation of the symbol by the Nazis was brought to her attention.

=== Use in Ukraine ===
Azov Brigade patch

Patriot of Ukraine

Far-right movements in Ukraine like the former Social-National Assembly and the Azov Brigade have used a 90-degree rotated Ƶ symbol with an elongated center stroke for the political slogan "National Idea" (Ukrainian: Ідея Нації), where the symbol is a combination of the letters ⟨N⟩ and ⟨I⟩. It closely resembles flipped (mirrored) Wolfsangel, however they deny any connection with Nazism, or with the Wolfsangel symbol. The symbol was placed over an inverted Black Sun, which itself is another Nazi symbol.

== Allographic variant of Z and Ż ==
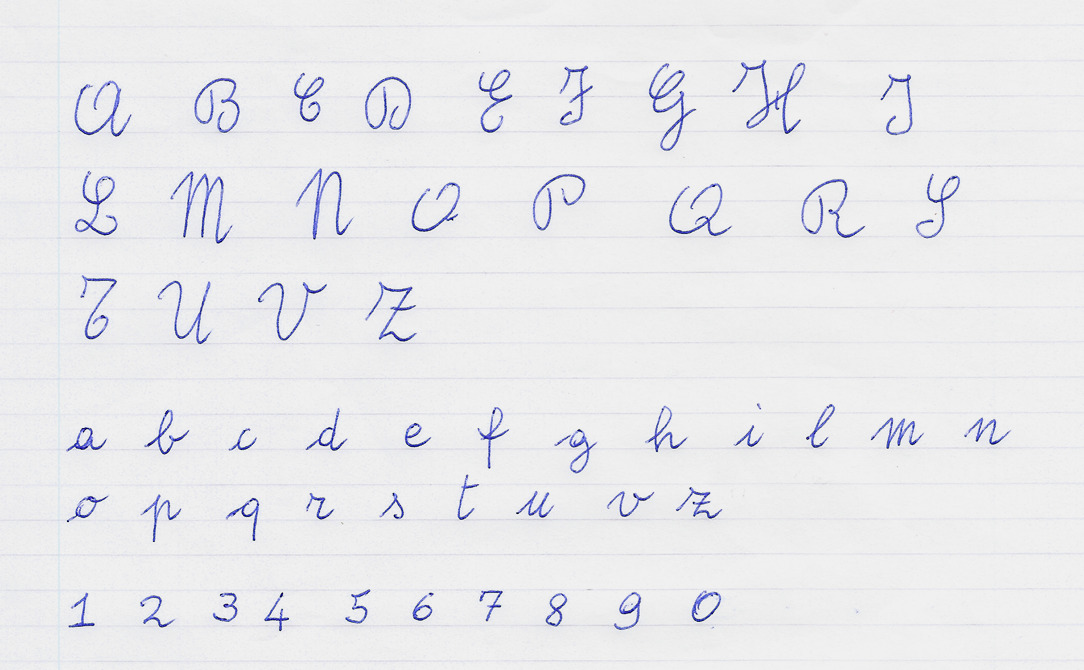
Handwritten alphabet as taught in Italian primary schools.

Many people and regions often use Ƶ as a handwritten variant of ⟨Z⟩, especially with mathematicians, scientists, and engineers to avoid confusion with the numeral two ⟨2⟩.

In Polish, the character Ƶ is used as an allographic variant of the letter ⟨Ż⟩ (called "Z with overdot"). It may be used in handwriting to more obviously distinguish it from ⟨Ź⟩ ("Z with acute"). In typography, uppercase Ƶ is often used instead of Ż where it is desirable to avoid exceeding cap height.

In Greek, the character Ƶ is a handwritten form of the letter Xi ⟨ξ⟩, where the horizontal stroke distinguishes it from Zeta ⟨ζ⟩.

== Use as a currency symbol ==
Ƶ was sometimes used instead of ⟨Z⟩ to represent the zaire, a former currency of the Democratic Republic of Congo.

In video games, Ƶ has been used as a fictional currency symbol, particularly in Japanese games where it can stand for zeni (Japanese for "money"). The Dragon Ball franchise, as well as Capcom games, use Ƶ in this way. It can also be found in the games EVE Online and Ace Combat 5: The Unsung War, where it stands for, respectively, the "Interstellar Kredit" (ISK) and the "Osean Zollar".

== Use in modern runic writing ==
Armanen runes and the 18th Gibor rune based on Ƶ

A 45-degree rotated Ƶ forms the basis of the Gibor rune, which is a pseudo-rune (i.e. not an actual ancient rune) invented in 1902 by the 19th-century Austrian mysticist and Germanic revivalist Guido von List, and features prominently in modern runic writing.

== Use in computers ==
The Unicode standard specifies two codepoints:

- U+01B5 Ƶ LATIN CAPITAL LETTER Z WITH STROKE
- U+01B6 ƶ LATIN SMALL LETTER Z WITH STROKE

== See also ==
- Bar (diacritic)
- Z (military symbol)
