= Wendehorn =

Pseudo-runic symbol

The Wendehorn

Wendehorn is a pseudo-runic symbol resembling the Tvimadur symbol, akin to a historical bindrune, consisting of the equally pseudo-runic symbols of the Lebensrune ("life rune") ᛘ and Todesrune ᛦ ("death rune"), symbolizing 'life' and 'death' respectively. The term is due to Guido von List's Das Geheimnis der Runen, where it does not figure as a full member of the Armanen runes, but is mentioned in the context of the crescent moon being "the rune of Freya, who promotes childbirth."

It was taken up by List's Armanist followers, such as Rudolf John Gorsleben, and Siegfried Adolf Kummer and is still in use in Irminenschaft and Armanenschaft-inspired esotericism today (Karl Spiesberger, Karl Hans Welz, Adolf Schleipfer, Larry E. Camp).

Karl Maria Wiligut utilised this symbol, referring to it as 'Wend-horn', in his own runic row but did not develop his runic row until 1934 and the Wendehorn is mentioned in List 1908, Gorsleben 1930 and Kummer 1932. Its earliest reference in contemporary times is in the many works of Guido von List, of which many are published before 1908.

Karl Spießberger in his 1955 Runenmagie identified it as a combination of "male Man" and "female Yr", symbolizing a hierosgamos.

The Wendehorn appears in "runic massage".

== See also ==
- Stephen E. Flowers
- Rudolf John Gorsleben
- Hagal (Armanen rune)
- Siegfried Adolf Kummer
- mother!
- Karl Spiesberger
- Jarl Widar
