= Hagal =

Hagal may refer to:

- Hagall, the Younger Futhark h rune
- Hagal (Armanen rune), from Guido von List's 20th century rune row
- Hagal (Dune), a fictional planet in Frank Herbert's Dune universe
