= Friedrich Marby =

German occultist

Friedrich Bernhard Marby (10 May 1882 – 3 December 1966) was a German rune occultist and Germanic revivalist. He is best known for his revivalism and use of the Armanen runes. Marby was imprisoned during the Third Reich, which may have been due to a denunciation by Karl Maria Wiligut. According to the Odinist magazine Vor Trú, Marby "was one of the most (if not the most) important figures in the realm of runic sciences" with an impact felt not only by contemporaries but "among today's researchers and practitioners."

== Early life ==
Born in Aurich, Ostfriesland, Friedrich Marby trained as a printer and worked as an editor.

== Rune scholarship ==
Marby was neither a university scholar nor a favoured Nazi ideologue. From 1924, he began publishing his amateur theories and research.

There was a school of rune scholars who interpreted the Eddas completely in anti-Semitic fashion, but Alan Baker in his book Invisible Eagle singles out Marby as one of the exceptions.

Marby, along with Siegfried Adolf Kummer, was criticized in a report to Heinrich Himmler by the Reichsführer's chief esoteric runologist, Karl Maria Wiligut. Nicholas Goodrick-Clarke states that Wiligut censured the two men "for bringing the holy Aryan heritage into disrepute and ridicule", suggesting "this criticism may have led to Marby's harsh treatment in the Third Reich."

According to Vor Trú, Marby spent eight years and three months in the camps at Flossenbürg, Welzheim, and Dachau before being released on 29 April 1945. He resumed publishing his magazine Forschung und Erfahrung (Research and Experience) and books. He died in 1966.

Marby's "runic gymnastics" (Runengymnastik) was advocated as "Rune-Yoga" (also "Runic Yoga", "Stadhagaldr") by Stephen Flowers ("Edred Thorsson") from the 1980s onward.
