= SS-Ehrenring =

SS ring awarded by Heinrich Himmler

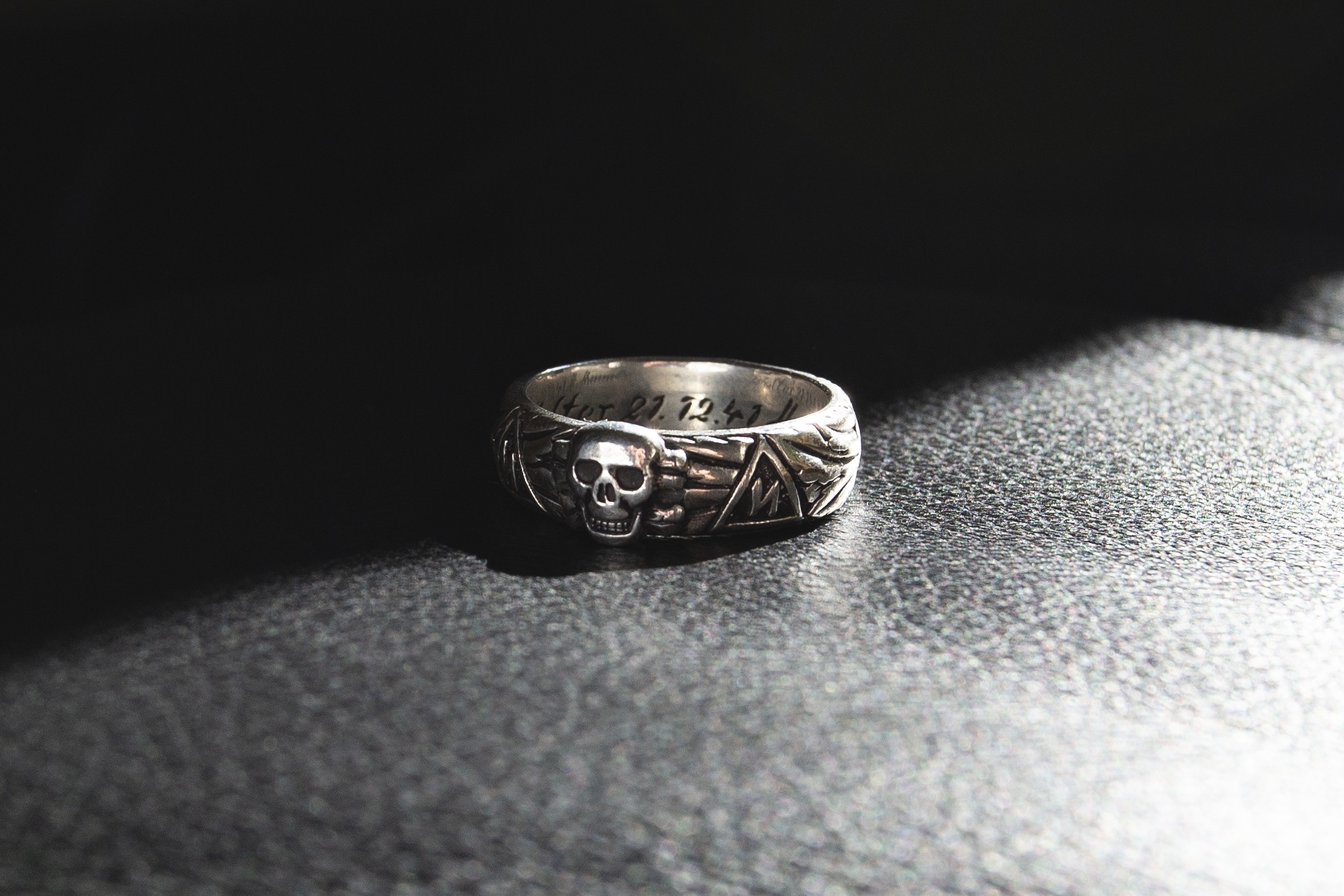
SS-Ehrenring

The SS-Ehrenring (German for "SS honour ring"), unofficially called Totenkopfring ("Death's Head ring" or "skull ring"), was an award of the Schutzstaffel (SS). The ring was not a state decoration but rather a personal gift bestowed by Heinrich Himmler to SS members of distinction. It became a highly sought-after award, one which could not be bought or sold, and counterfeit replicas were produced. The SS Honour Sword and SS Honour Dagger were similar awards.

== Award ==
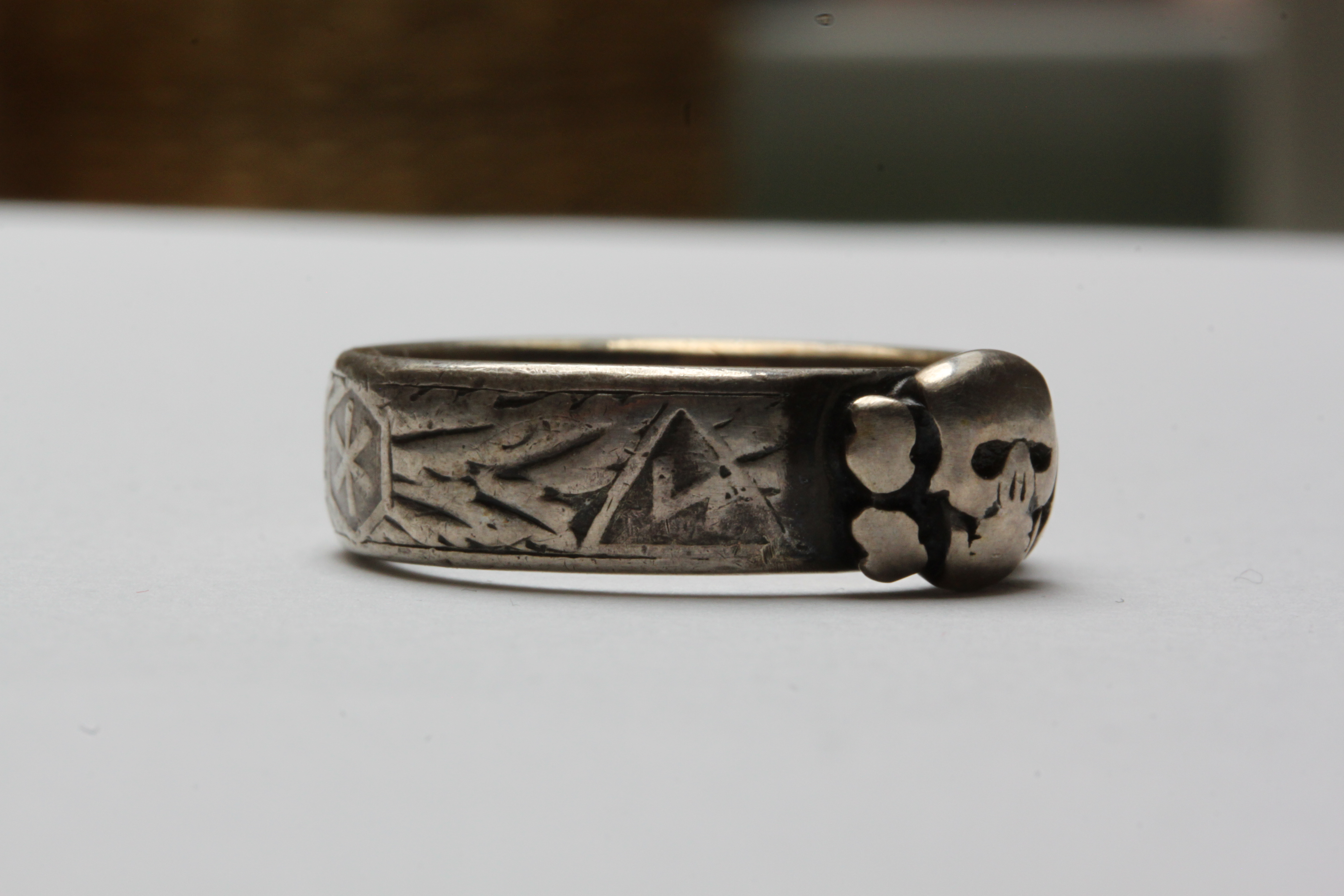
SS-Totenkopfring from 1933

The SS-Ehrenring was initially presented to senior officers of the Alter Kämpfer (Old Guard) within the SS, of whom there were fewer than 5,000. This was later expanded to all SS members who graduated from the SS-Junker Schools and other SS training facilities. Each ring had the recipient's name, the award date, and Himmler's signature engraved on the interior. The ring came with a standard letter from Himmler and citation. It was to be worn only on the left hand, on the "ring finger". The name of the recipient and the conferment date was added on the letter. In the letter, according to Himmler, the ring was a "reminder at all times to be willing to risk the life of ourselves for the life of the whole". Some SS and police members had local jewellers make unofficial versions to wear.

If an SS member was dismissed or retired from the service, his ring had to be returned. In 1938, Himmler ordered the return of all rings of dead SS men and officers to be stored in a chest at Wewelsburg Castle. This was to be a memorial to symbolise the ongoing membership of the deceased in the SS order. In October 1944, Himmler ordered that further manufacture and awards of the ring were to be halted. Himmler then ordered that all the remaining rings, approximately 11,500, be blast-sealed inside a hill near Wewelsburg. By January 1945, 64% of the 14,500 rings made had been returned to Himmler after the deaths of the "holders". In addition, 10% had been lost on the battlefield and 26% were either kept by the holder or their whereabouts were unknown.

== Design ==
SS-Ehrenring design

The symbolism of the ring reflects Himmler's interest in Germanic mysticism and includes the Totenkopf symbol and Armanen runes. The ring was designed by Karl Maria Wiligut, an Austrian occultist and SS-Brigadeführer with manufacturing provided by the Otto and Karolina Gahr Family Jewelry from Munich. Rings were manufactured following roughly two major types, the one defined in the 1930s and that of the 1940s. The ring models dating back to the 1930s were thinner while the later ones were thickened and the design of the skull changed. Rings were made of 90% silver cast in two halves with the recipient's name inside, the date of presentation, and a facsimile of Himmler's signature, plus the abbreviations S Lb. for "Seinem Lieben" or "His Beloved."

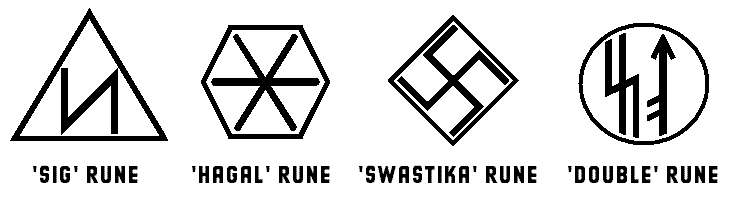
Runes seen on the ring

- One Sig rune left and right of the skull framed by a triangle represents the power of the sun and conquering energy.
- A Hagal rune (framed by a hexagon) which represents the faith and camaraderie that was idealised by the leaders of the organisation. The esoteric meaning of the Hagal rune was, according to Guido von List, to: "...enclose the universe in you and you control the universe."
- A swastika (standing on the vertex) framed by a square.
- The double runes on the rear of the ring framed by a circle were to be Heilszeichen (literally: signs of salvation) of the past. They were a creation of the SS designers rather than historical runes. They are Wiligut's variation of the Gibor rune plus a bind rune for o (Os) and t (Tyr). The bind rune was designed by Wiligut and spells Gott, the German word for "God."

The ring is wreathed with oak leaves.

== See also ==
- Nazi symbolism
