= Stan (rune) =

Rune

Name	Old English
Name	Stan
Name	stone
Shape	Futhorc
Unicode	ᛥ U+16E5
Transliteration	st
Transcription	st
IPA	[st]
Position in rune-row	*33

ᛥ, named stan ("stone"), is a rare rune denoting st (the sound cluster /st/) in the expanded 32-type (*33-type) Anglo-Saxon Futhorc writing system (9th–12th c.). The glyph looks like a double-ended ᛗ (ᛗ+ᛗ) or ᛖ (ᛖ+ᛖ).

The rune is a so called "manuscript rune", as it is only recorded in manuscripts.

The character was added into unicode in 1999 with Unicode 3.0.
