= Wolfsangel =

German heraldic charge

Stylized horizontal (left) and vertical (centre) forms of the Wolfsangel (or crampon), and a stylized Wolfsanker (or hameçon) (right).
In heraldry, the vertical form of the Ƶ-symbol is associated with the Donnerkeil (or "thunderbolt"), and the horizontal form of the Ƶ-symbol is associated with the Werwolf (or "Werewolf").

Wolfsangel (German pronunciation: [ˈvɔlfsˌʔaŋəl], translation: 'wolf's hook') or Crampon (French pronunciation: [kʁɑ̃pɔ̃]) is a heraldic charge from mainly Germany and eastern France, which was inspired by medieval European wolf traps that consisted of a Z-shaped metal hook (called the Wolfsangel, or the crampon in French) that was hung by a chain from a crescent-shaped metal bar (called the Wolfsanker, or the hameçon in French). The stylized symbol of the Z-shape (also called the Doppelhaken, meaning 'double-hook') can include a central horizontal bar to give a Ƶ-symbol, which can be reversed and/or rotated (ꑭ); it is sometimes mistaken as being an ancient rune due to its similarity to the "gibor rune" of the pseudo Armanen runes.

It became an early symbol of German liberty and independence after its adoption as an emblem in various 15th-century peasant revolts and also in the 17th-century Thirty Years' War. In pre-war Germany, interest in the Wolfsangel was revived by the popularity of Hermann Löns's 1910 novel Der Wehrwolf, which follows a hero in the Thirty Years' War. The Ƶ-symbol was later adopted by the Nazi Party, and was used by various German Wehrmacht and SS units such as the Waffen-SS Division Das Reich and the Waffen-SS Division Landstorm Nederland. The Anti-Defamation League, and others, list the Ƶ-symbol as a hate and a neo-Nazi symbol.

== Origins ==
=== Hunting tool ===
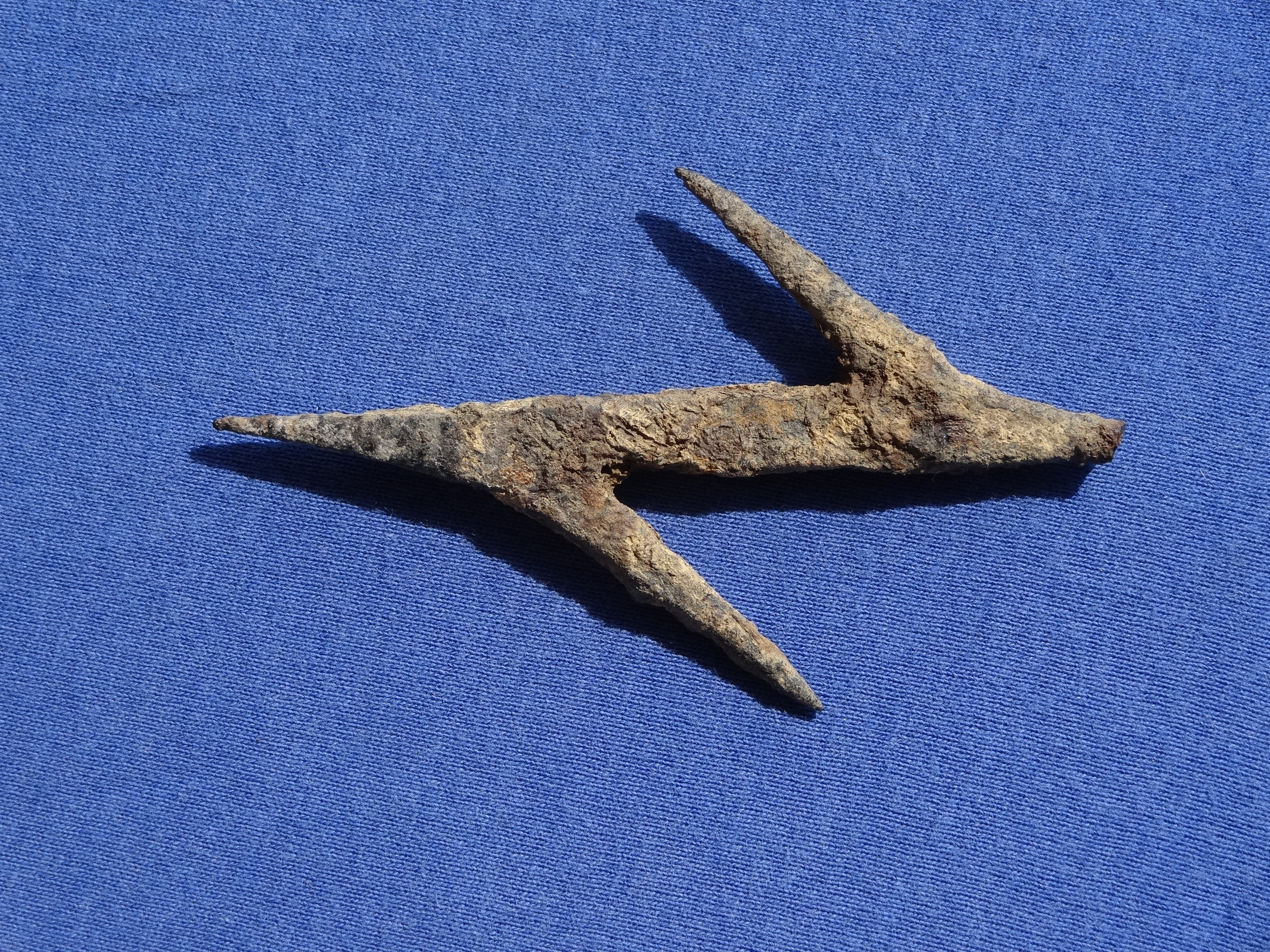
8th-century wolf hook from the Carolingian-era Villa Arnesburg in Lich, Germany

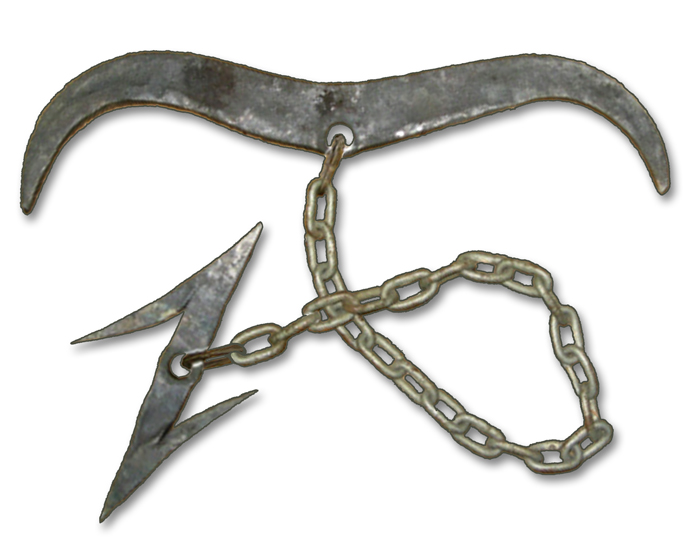
Reconstruction of a wolf hook (Z-shape) chained to a wolf anchor (crescent bar)

The Wolfsangel was a medieval European wolf hunting tool where the hook was concealed inside a chunk of meat that would impale any unsuspecting wolf gulping the meat in one movement.

The tool was developed by attaching the hook via a chain or rope to a larger bar (often with a double crescent or half-moon shape per photo opposite) lodged between the overhanging branches of a tree. This would encourage the wolf to jump up to gulp the hanging chunk of meat (with the hook concealed inside), thus further impaling itself in the manner of a fish caught on a fishing hook.

Medieval hunters were known to use "blood trails" to lead the wolf to the Wolfsangel trap and also used wattle fencing nearer to the trap to create narrow channels that would guide the wolf to the trap.

=== Names and symbols ===
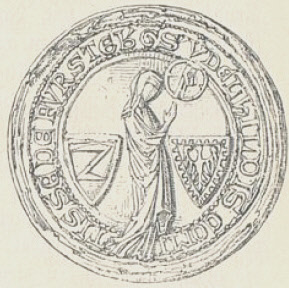
1299 seal of Countess Udilhild, née von Wolfach

Municipal coat of arms of Wolfach, Germany

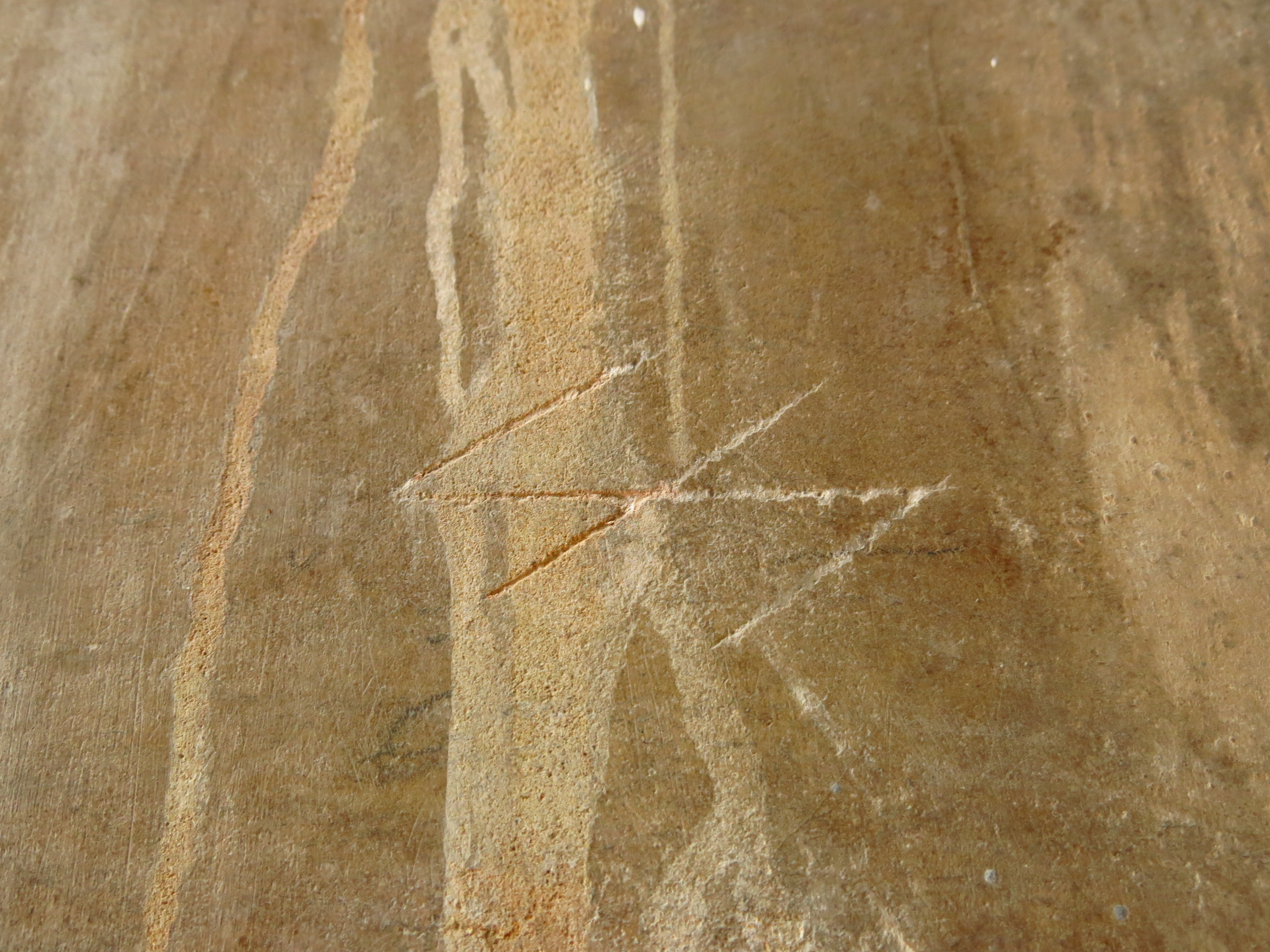
Horizontal Wolfsangel as a mason's mark, 15th-century church

Other German names include Wolfsanker 'wolf anchor' (the crescent-shaped bar holding the hook), Wolfshaken 'wolf hook', and Doppelhaken 'double hook'; French names include hameçon 'fish hook', hameçon de loup 'fish hook for wolves' and fer-a-loup 'wolf iron', as well as crampon 'iron hook'.

The stylised version of the Z-shaped Wolfsangel developed into a popular medieval symbol in Germany that was associated with magical powers, and was believed to have the ability to ward off wolves. The symbol appears on early medieval banners and town seals in Germany (particularly in forested regions where wolves were present in large numbers); for example, as early as 1299 the symbol is found on seals of the Lords of the German Black Forest town of Wolfach (see opposite, the seal of the widow Countess Udilhild von Fürstenberg, the sole heiress of the Lords of Wolfach); and their Wolfsangel banner became the municipal coat of arms for the town (see opposite). The symbol can be found as a medieval mason's mark.

The stylized Wolfsangel Z-symbol (i.e. excluding the horizontal bar) bears a visual resemblance to the proto-Germanic Eihwaz rune (meaning "yew"), historically part of the ancient runic alphabet. However, the full Wolfsangel Ƶ-symbol has no equivalent amongst ancient runic systems but is sometimes confused as such due to its similarity to the "gibor rune", the eighteenth pseudo rune that was created by the nineteenth-century German revivalist Guido von List as part of his Armanen runes.

=== Peasant revolts ===
Academic Akbar Ahmed writes that the Wolfsangel was adopted by 15th-century German peasants during revolts against oppressive German princes and their foreign mercenaries, and thus became an important early popular Germanic symbol of independence and liberty.

Ahmed further notes that during the 17th-century Thirty Years' War, groups of German militia waged a guerilla war against foreign forces under the German name Wehrwolf, and also adopted the Wolfsangel symbol as their emblem; they reportedly carved the symbol on the trees from which they hanged captured foreign combatants.

== In heraldry ==
Municipal arms of Wolxheim, Grand Est, France

Municipal arms of Wolfisheim, Grand Est, France

A heraldic hameçon in the arms of the von Stein family

Municipal arms of Idar-Oberstein, Rhineland-Palatinate

Municipal arms of Oestrich-Winkel, Hesse

Municipal arms Mommenheim, Rhineland-Palatinate

Municipal arms of Dassendorf, Schleswig-Holstein

Municipal arms of Ilvesheim, Baden-Württemberg

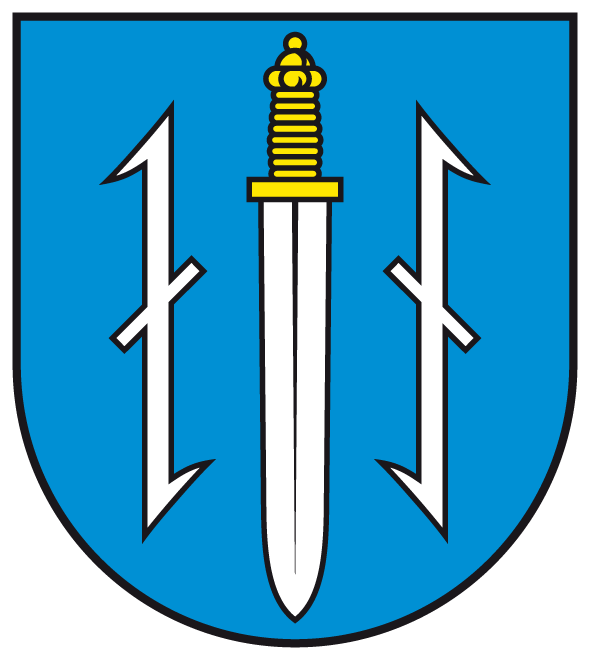
Municipal arms of Sibbesse, Lower Saxony

Municipal arms of Eppelborn, Saarland

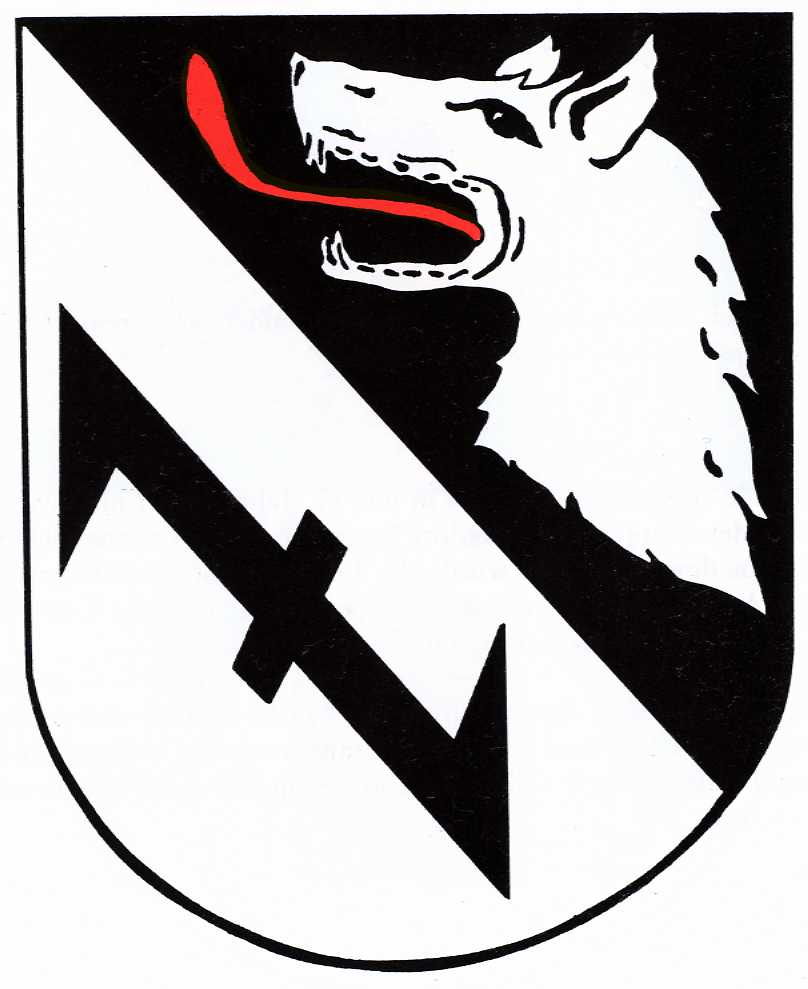
Municipal arms of Burgwedel, Lower Saxony

Municipal arms of Kleinblittersdorf, Saarland

The term "Wolfs-Angel" (German) and "Hameçon" (French) appears in a 1714 German heraldic handbook titled Wappenkunst. However, the description is more specifically about the Wolfsanker (or hameçon) component part of the Wolfsangel trap, and defines it as: "the shape of a crescent moon with a ring inside, at mid-height", which describes the bar from which the Z-shaped hook is hung (see the yellow coat of arms of the von Stein family in the table opposite for an example).

In modern German-language heraldic terminology, the name Wolfsangel is de facto used for a variety of heraldic charges, including the Wolfsanker from above (i.e. the half-moon shape with a ring that is also called a fer-de-loop), as well as the Wolfshaken or crampon (i.e. the Z-shaped or double-hook that is also called a Mauerhaken or a Doppelhaken, and that can also appear with a ring or a transversal stroke, Ƶ, at the center).

The Z-shaped symbol is found comparatively frequently in municipal coats of arms in Germany, and also in eastern France (see Wolfisheim or Wolxheim), where it is often identified as a Wolfsangel. The Ƶ-design is rarer but is found in about a dozen contemporary municipal coats of arms, and is usually (but not exclusively) represented as a reversed Ƶ-shape.

In heraldry, the upright or vertical form of the Ƶ-symbol is associated with the Donnerkeil (or "thunderbolt"), while the horizontal form of the Ƶ-symbol (ꑭ) is associated with the Werwolf (or "Werewolf").

== In forestry ==
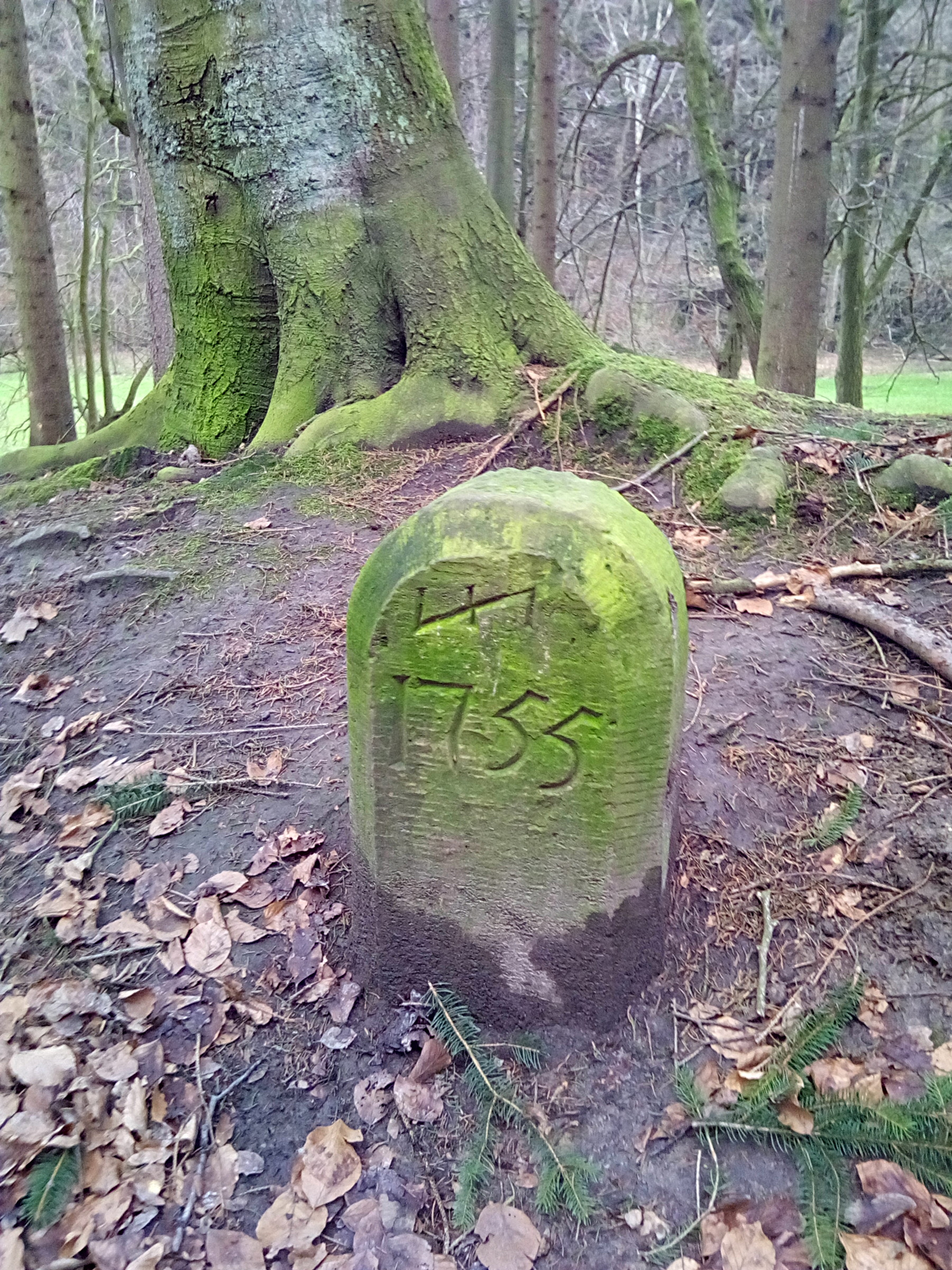
Wolfsangel on a 1755 boundary marker near the wood of Barsinghausen

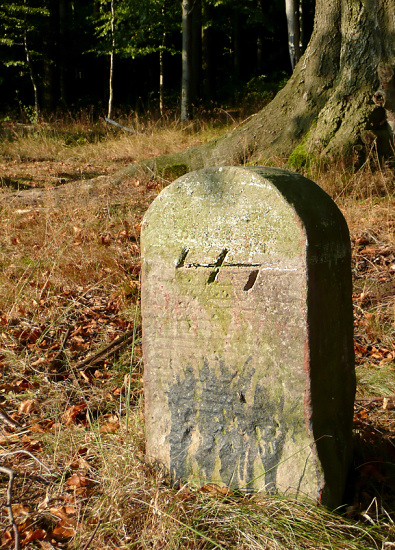
The Wolfsangel on an old field boundary stone in the Deister in Lower Saxony

In a 1616 boundary treaty concluded between Hesse and Brunswick-Lüneburg, the Brunswick forest boundary marker was called a Wulffsangel (a horizontal Wolfsangel). There is also evidence of its use in correspondence from the Forest Services in 1674.

Later, the Wolfsangel was also used as a symbol on forest uniforms. In a 1792 document regarding new uniforms, chief forester Adolf Friedrich von Stralenheim suggested a design for uniform buttons including the letters "GR" and a symbol similar to the Wolfsangel, which he called Forstzeichen. Later the Wolfsangel was also worn as a single badge in brass caps on the service and on the buttons of the Hanoverian forest supervisor. In Brunswick, it was prescribed for private forests and gamekeepers as a badge on the bonnet.

The Wolfsangel is still used in the various forest districts in Lower Saxony as a boundary marker and it is part of the emblem of the hunters' association of Lower Saxony and the club Hirschmann, dedicated to the breeding and training of Hanover Hounds.

== In literature ==
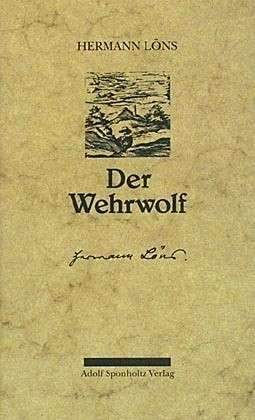
Der Wehrwolf

In pre-war 1930s Germany, interest in the Wolfsangel was revived by the popularity of Hermann Löns's 1910 novel entitled Der Wehrwolf (later published as Harm Wulf, a peasant chronicle, and as The Warwolf in English). The book is set in a 17th-century German farming community during the Thirty Years' War and the protagonist, a resistance fighter named Harm Wulf, adopts the Wolfsangel symbol as his personal badge.

Wolfsangel: German City on Trial is a 2000 book by August Niro on the 1944 Rüsselsheim massacre that occurred in the city of Rüsselsheim am Main, whose coat of arms features a Wolfsangel symbol. The book draws parallels with the origins and symbolism of the Wolfsangel, particularly resistance against foreign mercenaries, and the events of the massacre.

== As a Nazi symbol ==
The emblems of the 2nd SS Panzer Division Das Reich (1939–1945), the 4th SS Polizei Panzergrenadier Division (1939–1945) and the 34th SS Volunteer Grenadier Division Landstorm Nederland (1943–1945)

In Nazi Germany, the Wolfsangel symbol was widely adopted in Nazi symbolism. It is not clear whether the driver of its adoption was Hitler's strong personal association with wolf imagery (the Wolf's Lair for example), or to create an association with the post-15th-century symbol of German independence and liberty, which had a particular relationship to the achievement of German freedom from foreign influence by force.

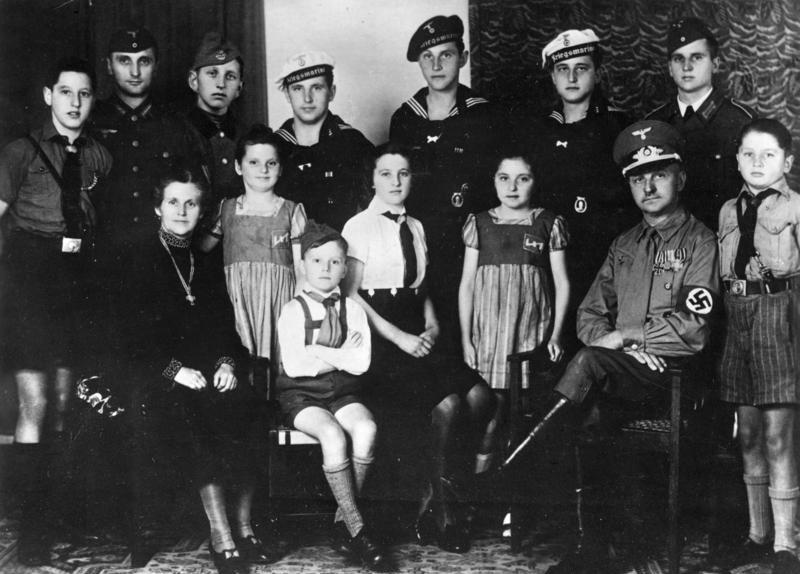
A Nazi leader and his family. The youngest girls wear Wolfsangel symbols in horizontal form as members of NS-Frauenschaft's Deutsche Kinderschar for children.

The symbol was used by a range of military and non-military Nazi-linked groups, including:

- the 19th Infantry Division (Wehrmacht)
- the 19th Panzer Division (Wehrmacht)
- the 33rd Infantry Division (Wehrmacht)
- the 206th Infantry Division (Wehrmacht)
- the 256th Infantry Division (Wehrmacht)
- the 2nd SS Panzer Division Das Reich
- the 4th SS Polizei Panzergrenadier Division
- the 34th SS Volunteer Grenadier Division Landstorm Nederland
- the Sturmabteilung "Feldherrnhalle" Wachstandart Kampfrunen (SA "Warlord's Hall" Guard Regiment)
- the NS-Volkswohlfahrt organization
- the Flämische Nazionalsozialistische Kraftfahr Korps (Vlaamsche NSKK)
- the "Vlaamse wacht" / zwarte brigade (Flemish guard / Black brigade)
- the "Dietse Militie" (Dietsch militia)
- the Nationaal-Socialistische Beweging NSB, Dutch Nazi fascist party, whose magazine was De Wolfsangel
- the Werwolf plan of resistance against allied occupation was intended to use this symbol.

== Post-World War II symbolism ==
Post WWII emblems resembling the Wolfsangel

Emblem of US hate group Aryan Nations

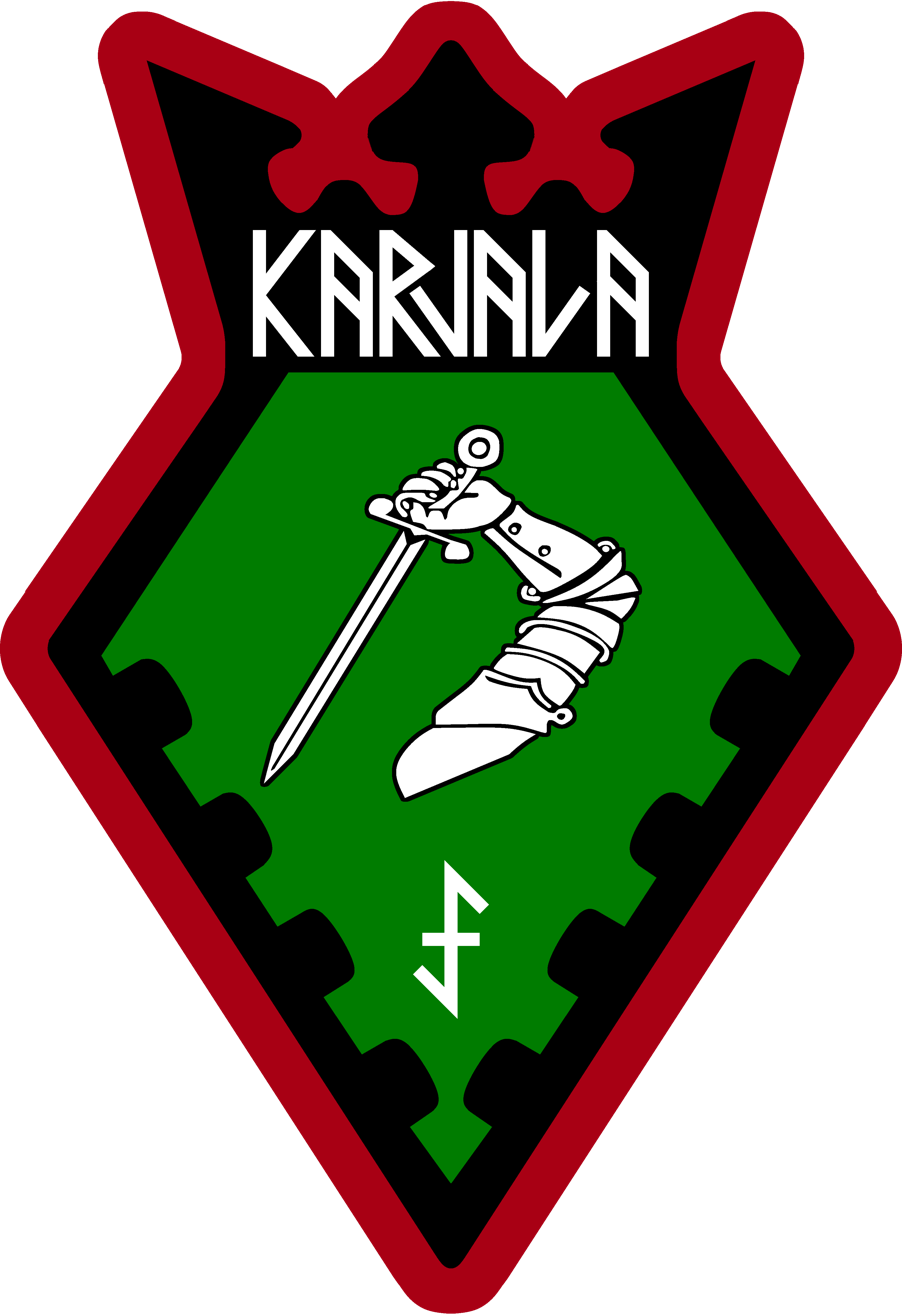
Insignia of the Karelian National Battalion

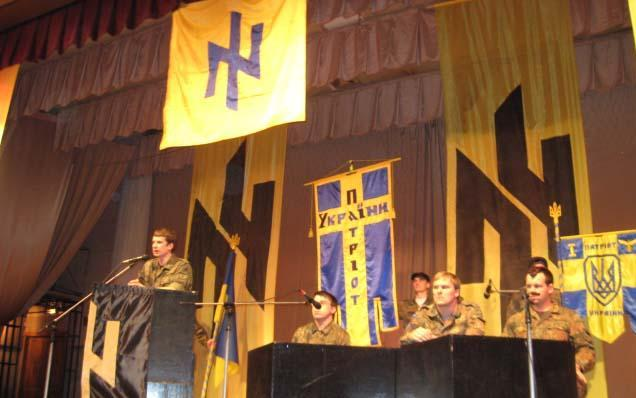
Andriy Biletsky addresses the Second Congress of the Patriot of Ukraine, Kharkiv, 12 April 2008

After World War II, public exhibition of the Wolfsangel symbol became illegal in Germany if it was connected with Neo-Nazi groups. On 9 August 2018 Germany lifted the ban on the usage of swastikas and other Nazi symbols in video games. "Through the change in the interpretation of the law, games that critically look at current affairs can for the first time be given a USK age rating," USK managing director Elisabeth Secker told CTV. "This has long been the case for films and with regards to the freedom of the arts, this is now rightly also the case with computer and videogames."

Outside of Germany, the Wolfsangel symbol has been used by some Neo-Nazi organizations such as in the United States where Aryan Nations organization uses a white Wolfsangel-like symbol with a sword replacing the cross-bar in its logo. The US-based Anti-Defamation League (ADL) database, as well as other non-governmental organisations, list the Wolfsangel as a hate symbol and as a neo-Nazi symbol. In Italy, the Wolfsangel was the symbol used by the far right movement Terza Posizione.

In Ukraine, far-right movements like the Social-National Party of Ukraine and the Social-National Assembly, as well as the Azov Regiment of the Ukrainian army, have used a similar symbol of ꑭ (an elongated centre bar and the Z being rotated but untypically not reversed). The group claims that the symbol is a composite of the "N" and the "I", for their political slogan Ідея Нації (Ukrainian for "National Idea"), and deny any connection or attempt to draw a parallel with the regiment and Nazism. Political scientist Andreas Umland told Deutsche Welle, that though it had far-right connotations, the Wolfsangel was not considered a fascist symbol by the general population in Ukraine. The Reporting Radicalism initiative from Freedom House notes that "accidental use of this symbol or its use without an understanding of its connotations (for example as a talisman) is rare", and "...in Ukraine, the use of a Wolfsangel as a heraldic symbol or a traditional talisman would be uncharacteristic". The Karelian National Battalion, a pro-Ukrainian volunteer battalion formed in January 2023, features a Wolfsangel in the middle of the battalion's insignia.

In 2020, there was a brief trend of Generation Z TikTok users tattooing a "Generation Ƶ" symbol on the arm as "a symbol of unity in our generation but also as a sign of rebellion" (in the manner of the 15th-century peasant's revolts). The originator of the trend later renounced it when the use of the symbol by the Nazis was brought to her attention.

== In sport ==
SC Verl, a football club that is currently competing in the German third-tier 3. Liga, also has a Wolfsangel in its crest, although no political contexts is associated to it.

== See also ==
- List of symbols designated by the Anti-Defamation League as hate symbols
- Fascist symbolism
- Modern runic writing
- Wolf hunting
- Z with stroke

== Sources ==
- K. von Alberti (1960). Die sogenannte Wolfsangel in der Heraldik (in German). Südwestdeutsche Blätter für Familien und Wappenkunde. p. 89.
- H. Horstmann (1955). Die Wolfsangel als Jagdgerät und Wappenbild (in German). Vj. Bl. d. Trierer Gesellschaft für nützliche Forschungen.
