= Siegfried Adolf Kummer =

German mystic and Germanic revivalist

Siegfried Adolf Kummer from his book "Heilige Runenmacht"

Siegfried Adolf Kummer (24 September 1899 in Radeberg – 1977 in Dresden) was a German mystic and Germanic revivalist. He is also most well known for his revivalism and use of the Armanen runes row. He, along with Friedrich Bernhard Marby, were imprisoned during the Third Reich for being unauthorised occultists.

== Biography ==
Original 1932 cover of Siegfried Adolf Kummer’ book "Heilige Runenmacht"

Little is known of his life or of his fate in the wake of the events of the Nazi era.

Kummer, along with Friedrich Bernhard Marby, were criticized by name in a report made to Heinrich Himmler by his chief esoteric runologist Karl Maria Wiligut. Goodrick-Clarke states that they were "censured by Wiligut in his capacity as Himmler's counsellor on magical and religious subjects for bringing the holy Aryan heritage into disrepute and riducule and this criticism may have led to Marby's harsh treatment in the Third Reich." But what his fate was is unknown. At least one report has him fleeing Nazi Germany in exile to South America.

In 1927, Kummer founded a "runic school" called Runa, associated with the summer school Bielatal Bärenstein of Georg and Alfred Richter. The runic exercises, comparable to the "runic gymnastics" of Marby, runic dancing and runic songs were taught. Kummer held that

"As a we now can receive various waves by means of a radio device, so the German by means of runic exercises and dances can regulate the influx of invisible ethereal cosmic waves. Those who dismiss this as impossible will never be able to detect thought waves, because they are in disharmony with the cosmic All, and are impeded by racially foreign blood."

== Written works ==
- Heilige Runenmacht (1932)
- Runen-Magie (1933)
- Runen – Raunen: Eine Sammlg eingesandter Berichte nach d. Runenkunden
- Walhall
