= Hagal (Armanen rune) =

Armanen runic letter

Hagal rune

Hagal is the 7th pseudo-rune of Armanen Futharkh of Guido von List, derived from the Younger Futhark Hagal rune ᚼ.

Hagal is the "mother rune" of the Armanen system and also seen as such by List's contemporaries Jörg Lanz von Liebenfels, Adolf Schleipfer, Peryt Shou, Siegfried Adolf Kummer, Rudolf John Gorsleben, Friedrich Bernhard Marby, Werner von Bülow, Wilhelm Wulff and more recently Karl Spiesberger and Karl Hans Welz.

It is seen as the central axis point of the hexagonal crystal of which the Armanen runes are derived.

In one of its simple formats, it resembles the Wendehorn.

== See also ==
- Armanen runes
- Julleuchter
