= Peryt Shou =

German occultist (1873–1953)

- Born: 22 April 1873; Kröslin
- Died: 24 October 1953
- Occupation: Occultist

Peryt Shou (legal name Albert Christian Georg [Jörg] Schultz) (22 April 1873 – 24 October 1953) was a German occultist, pagan revivalist and theosophist. He is mentioned briefly by Goodrick-Clarke (The Occult Roots of Nazism, 1985: 165) as a writer of novels with occult themes and a significant figure in the post-World War I German occult movement. During Nazi Germany, he apparently went without being persecuted.

== Biography ==
Shou was born the son of an innkeeper in Kröslin near Wolgast in Pomerania. He studied in Berlin and devoted himself to poetry, painting and eventually the secret sciences. During the course of his career he authored some forty books, most of which have been forgotten and lost in obscurity. However, he remains one of the most important esotericists of 20th-century Germany. This is mainly because his works, although obscure, were nevertheless extremely influential on other German occultists of the day. His writings are known to have influenced Walter Nauhaus, the co-founder of the Thule Society (Goodrick-Clarke 1985: 143).

Aleister Crowley, while in Berlin showing his paintings, wrote in his diary for 11 February 1932: "[ Krumm-Heller ] here with Peryt Shou".

== Yoga ==
Shou was an early yoga teacher who taught Praktische Mantramistik (practical mantracism) as an occult practice to unblock powers of Vokalatem (vocal breath). This consisted of chanting specific combinations of syllables. Shou argued that mantras were an important part of his yoga system that also involved controlled breathing and visualisation techniques. As an occultist, Shou used "mantracistic prayers" to allegedly develop extrasensory abilities such as mind control and telepathy.

== Selected publications ==
- The Edda as Key to the Coming Age (1920, translated in 2004)
- Yoga als Weg zur ewigen Jugend (1924)

== See also ==
- Ariosophy
- Nazi occultism
