= Pseudo-runes =

Incised characters that are intended to imitate runes

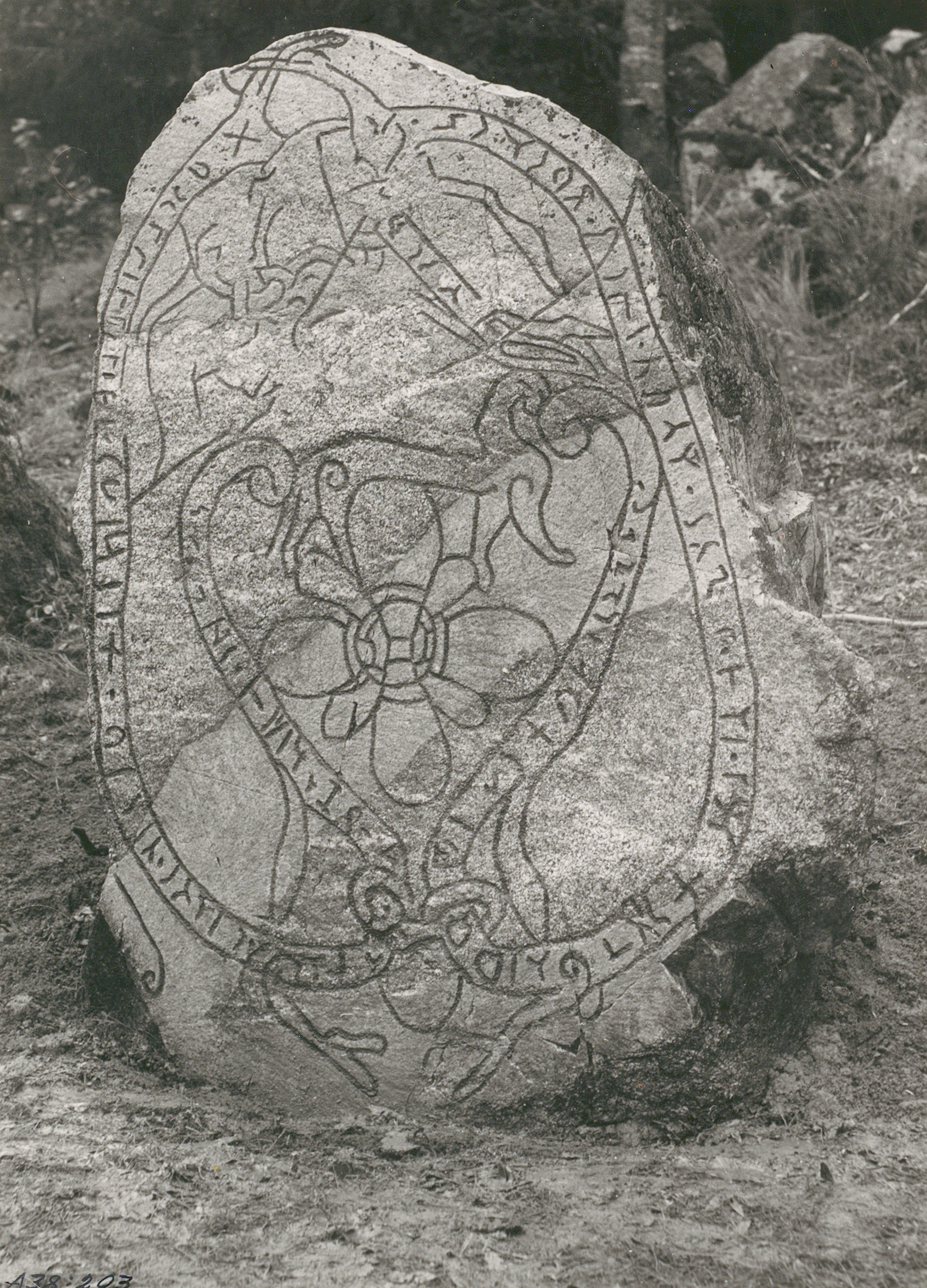
Runestone U 835, a late medieval attempt at making an 11th-century looking runestone, featuring rune-looking pseudo-symbols of no meaning, probably due to the creator not knowing runic.

Pseudo-runes are glyphs that look like Germanic runes, adjectivally called Runiform, but are not true runes. The term is mostly used of incised characters that are intended to imitate runes, often visually or symbolically, sometimes even with no linguistic content, but it can also be used to describe characters of other written languages which resemble runes, for example: Old Turkic script, Old Hungarian script, Old Italic scripts, Ancient South Arabian script.

The term "pseudo-runes" has also been used for runes "invented" after the end of the classic period of runic epigraphy, used only in medieval manuscripts but not in inscriptions. It has also been used for unrelated historical scripts with an appearance similar to runes, and of modern Latin alphabet variants intended to be reminiscent of runic script.

== Historical runes ==
=== Cipher runes ===
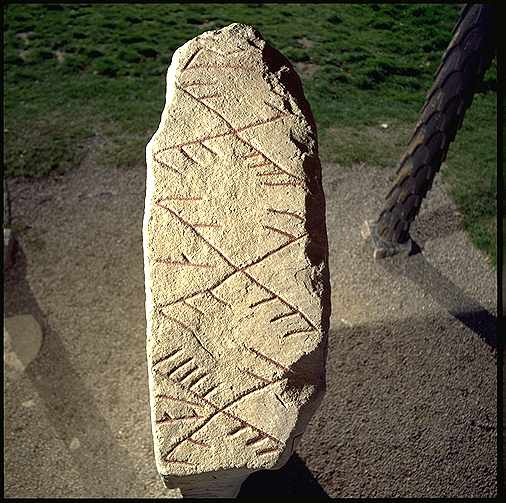
Cross-arm cipher runes (Swedish: korsarmsrunor) on the Rök runestone.

Cipher runes are cipher systems used as a replacement of standard runes but which do have an intended reading. These are generally not called pseudo-runes but can fit the definition.

=== Manuscript-only runes ===
The term pseudo-rune has been used by R. I. Page to refer to runic letters that only occur in manuscripts and are not attested in any extant runic inscription. Such runes include cweorð ᛢ, stan ᛥ, and ior ᛡ. The main variant shape of the rune gér is identical to ᛡ (with ᛄ being a secondary variant of ger), and should not be confused for ior when found epigraphically. The age of these "manuscript-only" runes overlaps with the period of runic inscriptions, e.g. cweorth and stan are both found in the 9th-century Codex Vindobonensis 795.

The view of calling manuscript-only runes "pseudo-runes" is not shared by historical or modern runologists, since runes are defined as characters for writing, not strictly for inscriptions, reflecting historical usage.

== Unhistorical runes ==
=== Armanen runes ===
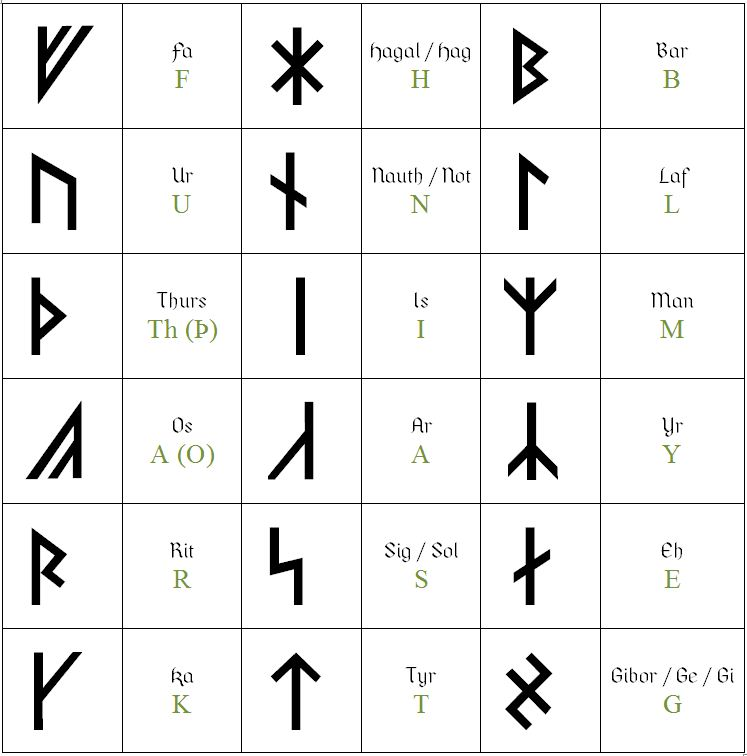
The Armanen runes

Of a different type are the pseudo-runes invented in the modern period, such as the unhistorical Armanen runes, or Armanen Futharkh, created by Guido von List in 1902 and later authors of Germanic mysticism (e.g. Gibor, Hagal, Wendehorn).

The following Armanen runes have their own articles:

- Hagal (Armanen rune)
- Wendehorn

=== SS runes ===
SS runes

SS runes (German: SS-Runen; singular: SS-Rune) are rune-like symbols originally used by the German Nazi paramilitary organisation SS (Schutzstaffel) as esoteric insignia during World War II. They were inspired by Guido von List's Armanen runes (see above), which had been used by Nazis prior.

SS runes were mainly used decoratively as symbols and were not viable for writing, even if they sometimes were used in writing as ideograms.

=== Pseudo-bindrunes ===
In modern paganism, new age mysticism and neopagan witchcraft there is the practice of combining various historical runes (mainly Elder runes), with new meanings, and other rune-like symbols, into larger symbols of esoteric value, erroneously called "bindrunes". They often follow the principle of samstavsrunor ("same-stave-runes"), being stacked on top of each other so that a main vertical stave can connect them all, which is mainly done for aesthetic reasons. Other examples connect the runic staves in various unconventional ways, sometimes even with added aesthetic staves with no rhyme or reason.

"Web of Wyrd", a modern day symbol first appearing in Helrunar: A Manual of Rune Magick (1993, Mandrake of Oxford), by German occultist Jan Fries.

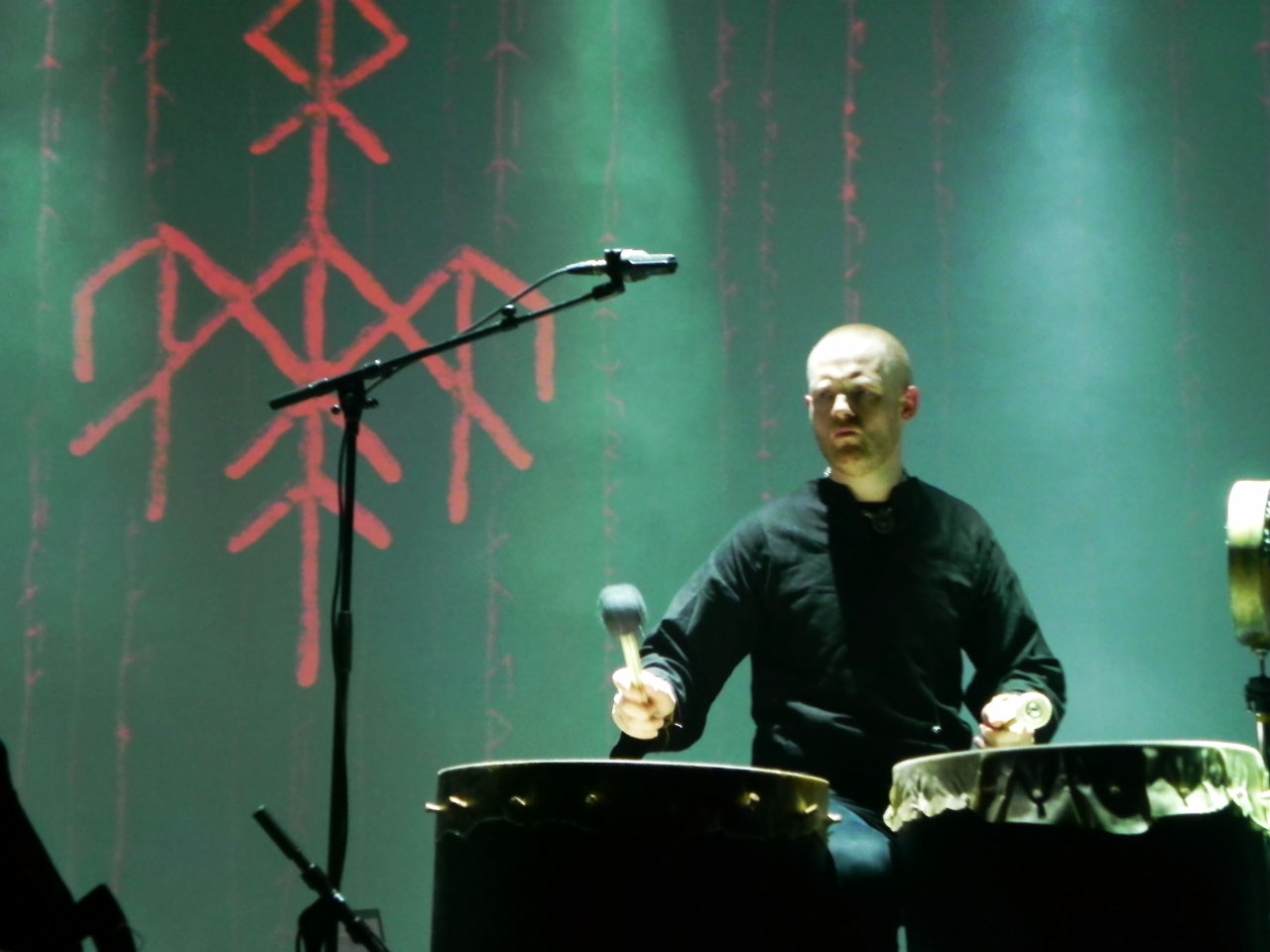
Logotype of Norwegian "dark/pagan folk band" Wardruna in the background, an example of an unconforming neopagan pseudo-bindrune.

=== Icelandic magical staves (galdrastafir) ===
Icelandic magical staves (Icelandic: galdrastafir, lit. 'galdr staves') can be called a form of pseudo-rune due to them erroneously being called runes or bind-runes by some people due to their appearance and connection to Iceland.

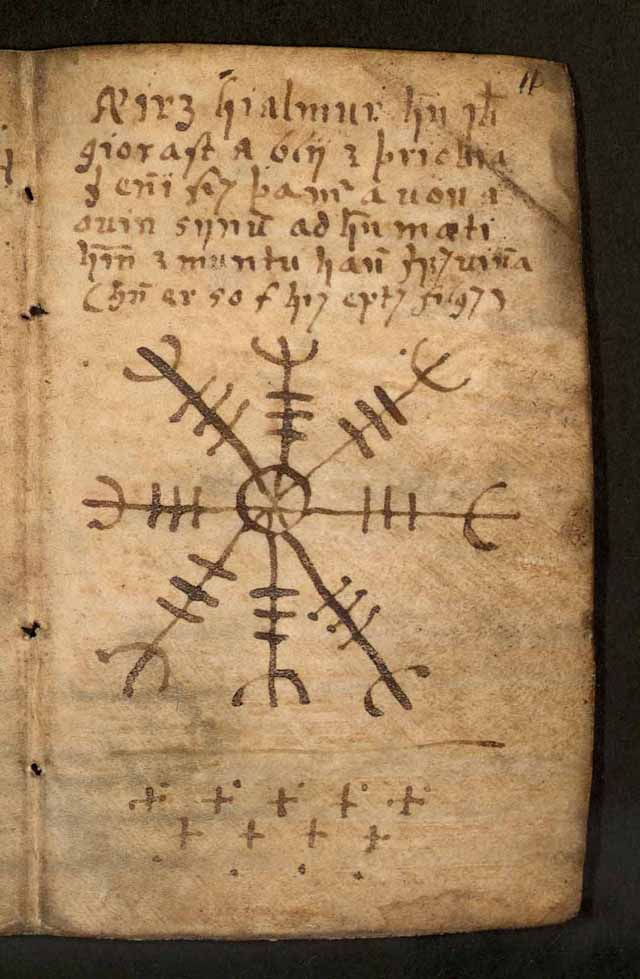
Ægishjálmur in the Galdrakver manuscript (c. 1670)

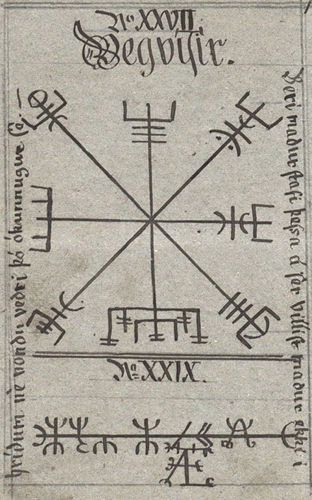
Vegvísir in the Huld Manuscript (c. 1860)

== Imitation runes ==
=== Non-lexical inscriptions ===
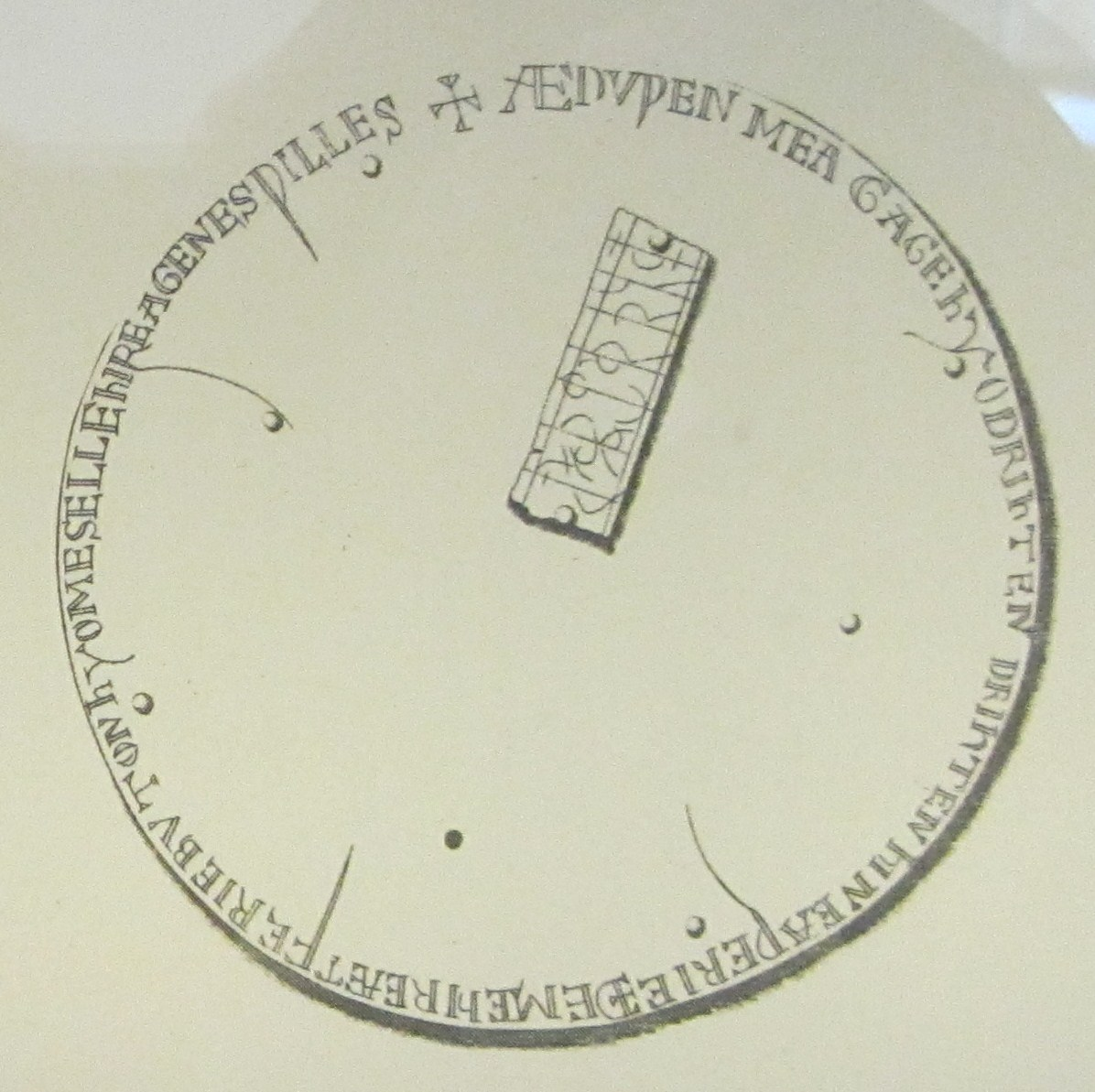
Reverse of Ædwen's brooch, an 11th-century Anglo-Saxon silver disc brooch with seven pseudo-runes on a silver strip in the centre

The main use of the term pseudo-rune is in reference to epigraphic inscriptions using letters that imitate the appearance of runes, but which cannot be read as runes. These are different from cryptic or magical runic inscriptions comprising a seemingly random jumble of runic letters, which cannot be interpreted by modern scholars, but can at least be read. In contrast, pseudo-runic inscriptions consist mostly of false letters (some pseudo-runes within a pseudo-runic inscription may coincidentally appear similar or identical to true runes), and so cannot be read at all, even nonsensically.

It has been suggested that pseudo-runic inscriptions were not made by specialist 'rune masters' as is thought to have been the case when carving traditional runic inscriptions, but were made by artisans who were largely ignorant of runes. According to Nowell Myres, pseudo-runes may have been "intended to impress the illiterate as having some arcane significance".

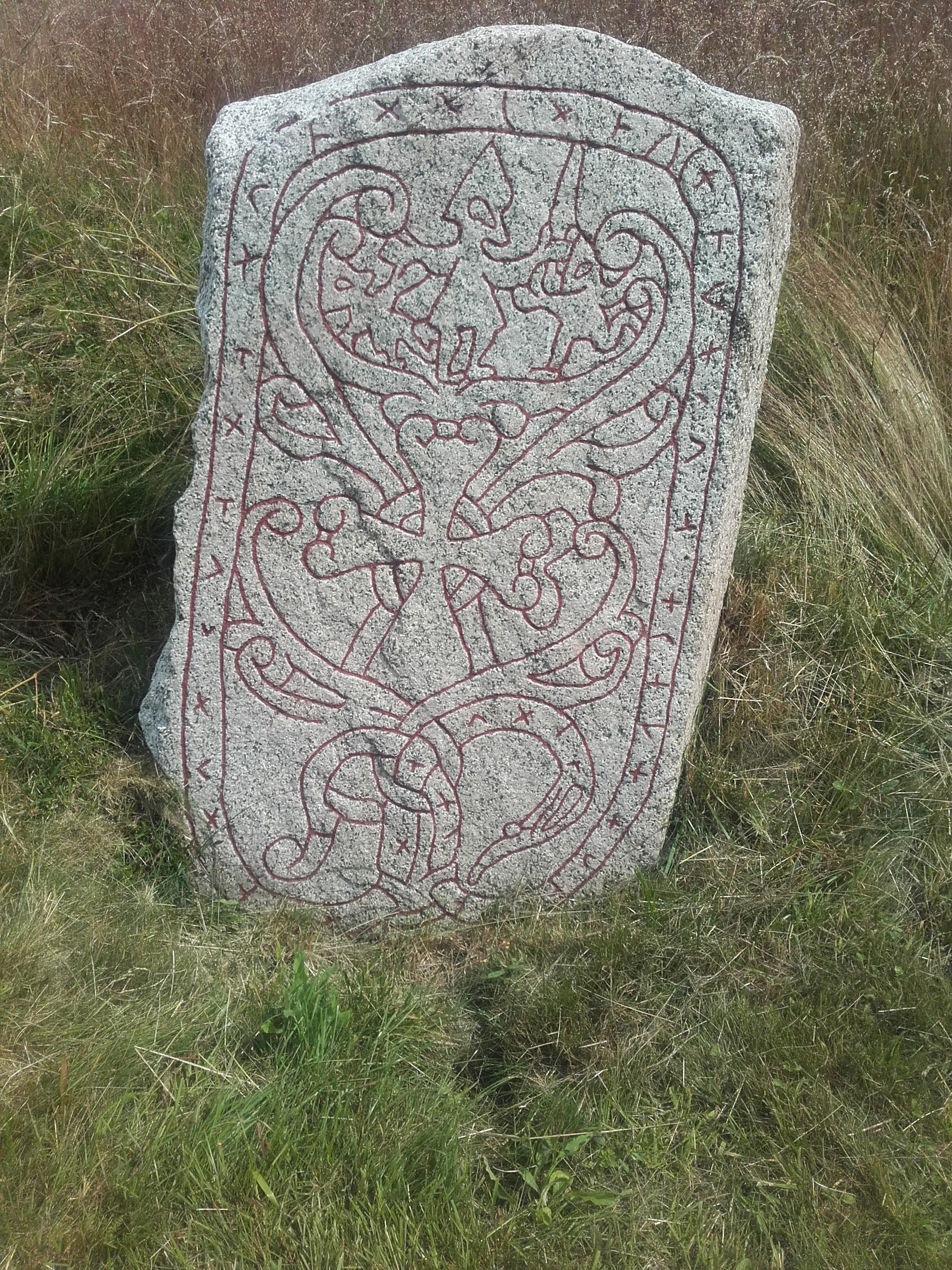
Uppland Runic Inscription 1175

In Swedish runology, such are called "nonsense inscriptions" (nonsensinskrifter), or "non-lexical inscriptions" (icke-lexikala inskrifter), which are runic inscriptions with imitation runes or illiterate text.

The following inscriptions have been marked as such:

- Närke Runic Inscription 19
- Södermanland Runic Inscription 93
- Södermanland Runic Inscription 225
- Södermanland Runic Inscription 261
- Danish Runic Inscription 187 (Sørup runestone) – also proposed to have been written in Basque language
- Uppland Runic Inscription 483
- Uppland Runic Inscription 487
- Uppland Runic Inscription 888
- Uppland Runic Inscription 1061
- Uppland Runic Inscription 1175
- Uppland Runic Inscription 1179
- Uppland Runic Inscription 1180
- Östergötland Runic Inscription 137

=== Fantasy scripts ===
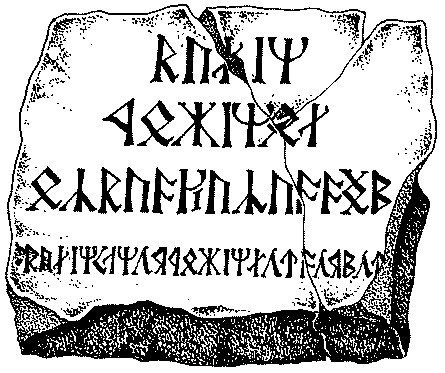
Example of Cirth pseudo-runes

A common trait in modern high fantasy is the creation of fantasy scripts for different fantasy languages and cultures. Many of these are heavily inspired by historical runes and may be indistinguishable to the untrained eye. One of the instigators for such scripts was J. R. R. Tolkien, who in his works not only used historical runes, but also invented his own runic script called Cirth.

Tolkien mainly used Cirth for Khuzdûl, the language of the Dwarves, and various fantasy franchises have followed this pattern, such as Dethek, the script used for Dwarvish and some other languages in Wizards of the Coast's Forgotten Realms setting for the role-playing game Dungeons & Dragons, and Klinkarhun, likewise the script of the Dwarvish language Khazalid, in Games Workshop's Warhammer Fantasy setting.

== Runiform scripts ==
Runiform generally refers to historic scripts which are written with glyphs that are similar in form to the runic script. The historical runiform Old Turkic script and Old Hungarian script, unrelated with the runes but similar in application (inscriptions etched in stone), have sometimes been referred to as pseudo-runes or pseudo-runic. The likely predecessor of runic, Old Italic, also share its likeness, as well as many characters.

The following scripts could be referred to as runiform:

- Ancient South Arabian script
- Coelbren y Beirdd
- Old Hungarian alphabet
- Old Italic scripts
  - Etruscan alphabet
- Old Turkic alphabet
- Pre-Christian Slavic writing
- Siglas poveiras

Ogham was also a stone-carved script, although it did not visually resemble runes.

== See also ==
- Bind runes
- Calendar runes
- House marks
- List of runestones
- Pseudo-Kufic – Imitations of Arabic in European Middle Ages and Renaissance art
