= Karl Maria Wiligut =

Austrian occultist and soldier (1866–1946)

Karl Wiligut
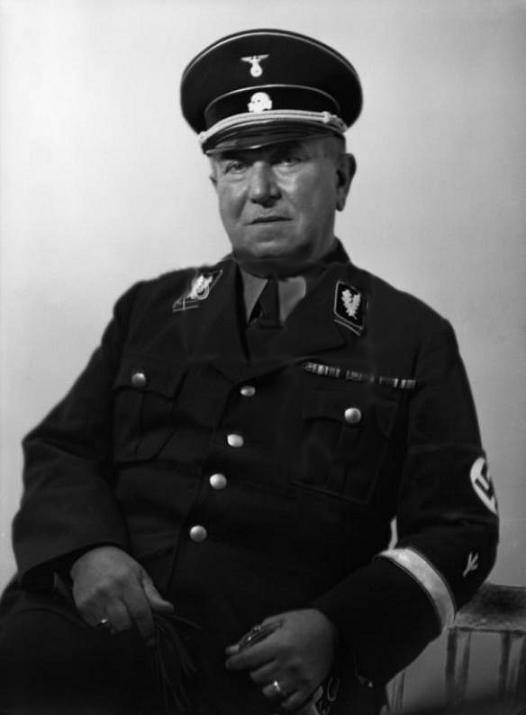
- Wiligut in the 1930s
- Born: 10 December 1866; Vienna, Austrian Empire
- Died: 3 January 1946 (aged 79) Arolsen, Allied-occupied Germany
- Allegiance: Austria-Hungary; Germany
- Branch: Austro-Hungarian Army; Schutzstaffel
- Service years: 1883–1918; 1933–1939
- Rank: Colonel (Austria-Hungary); Brigadeführer (SS)
- Conflicts: World War I

Karl Maria Wiligut (alias Weisthor, Jarl Widar, Lobesam; 10 December 1866 – 3 January 1946) was an Austrian Völkisch occultist and soldier. He served in the Austro-Hungarian Army during World War I and was a leading figure in the Armanism movement, eventually joining the SS after being recruited by Heinrich Himmler.

== Early life and career ==
Karl Maria Wiligut was born in Vienna on December 10, 1866, into a Catholic military family. Both his father and grandfather had served in the military and at the age of 14, he was enrolled in Breitensee Imperial Cadet Academy After graduating, he was conscripted to the k.u.k. infantry regiment of Milan I King of Serbia. On 17 December 1883 he was appointed to infantry, four days later he became a Gefreiter (private). In 1888, he was promoted to lieutenant.

Karl showed interest in the Völkisch movement early on in his life. In 1889, he joined the quasi-masonic "Schlaraffia-Loge" and in 1903, he published his first book, Seyfrieds Runen, a collection of poems and stories concerning ancient Germanic runes. 1908, he published his second book Neun Gebote Gôts, on the subject Irminism. Wiligut claimed to be a "Magus-King", the descendant of an ancient line of god-kings dating back to 228,000 B.C., and that he was able to see into the past lives of his ancestors.

During World War I, Wiligut served on both the Italian and Eastern front. He served with 30th Infantry Regiment in the Carpathian Mountains before commanding a training unit near Salzburg in Austria-Hungary. He was decorated for gallantry and on 1 August 1917, he was promoted to colonel. In May 1918, he was retired from the front and commanded a convalescence camp near Lviv. After almost 40 years in military service, he retired on 1 January 1919 with an impeccable record, and moved to Morzg near Salzburg where he dedicated his time to occult studies. He renewed his acquaintance with Theodor Czepl of the Ordo Novi Templi, who in winter 1920-21 spent seven weeks in Wiligut's house. Czepl compiled a report for the archive of the O.N.T., where he describes Wiligut as "a man martial in aspect, who revealed himself as bearer of a secret line of German kingship".

== Personal life ==
Wiligut was a freemason in his youth.

In 1906, he married Malwine Leurs von Treuenringen of Bozen, with whom he had two daughters, Gertrud and Lotte. A twin brother of one of the girls died as an infant, a devastating tragedy for Wiligut, who was desperate for a male heir to which he could pass on his "secret knowledge", which estranged him from his wife.

Wiligut's wife remained unimpressed by her husband's claim to kingship; blaming him for their destitution, she pushed for his committal to a mental hospital. On 29 November 1924, while he was at a cafe with friends, police arrested Wiligut and he was sent to the local mental institution, where he was confined for several years.

Wiligut's medical records reflect violence at home, including threats to kill his wife, grandiose projects, eccentric behavior and occult interests. Following this arrest in 1924, he was diagnosed with schizophrenia and megalomania. He was declared legally incompetent by a Salzburg court and committed to a Salzburg asylum, where he remained until 1927. In 1932, he abandoned his wife and family, and emigrated from Austria to Germany, residing in Munich. He is known to have corresponded with many admirers and disciples, including Ernst Rüdiger Starhemberg and members of the Order of the New Templars.

== Involvement in Himmler's personal staff ==
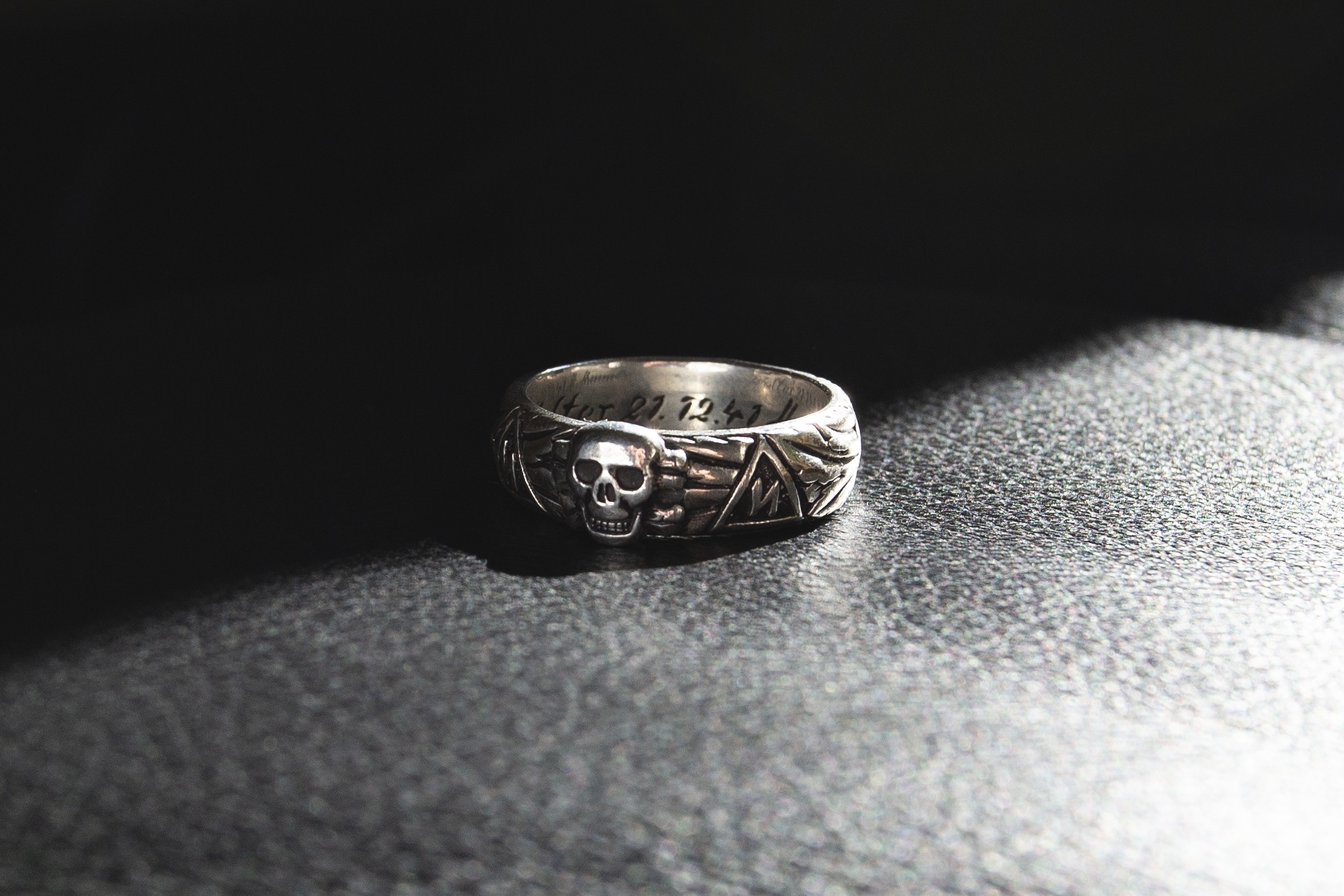
Karl Wiligut designed the SS-Ehrenring.

Wiligut made a name for himself in occult circles in Germany, eventually getting the attention of the head of the SS, Heinrich Himmler. He was introduced to Himmler in September 1933 at a conference of the Nordische Gesellschaft. This introduction was carried out by Richard Anders, an SS officer and fellow member of the Ordo Novi Templi. Shortly afterwards, Wiligut was inducted into the SS (under the pseudonym "Karl Maria Weisthor") to head a Department for Pre- and Early History which was created for him within the SS Race and Settlement Main Office (RuSHA). In April 1934 he was promoted to the SS equivalent of his old colonel rank (Standartenführer), and then made head of Section VIII (Archives) for RuSHA in October 1934. In November 1934 a promotion followed to the rank of Oberführer (lieutenant-brigadier), and then in the spring of 1935 Wiligut was transferred to Berlin to serve on Himmler's personal staff. He also worked within the Ahnenerbe, a pseudoscientific research organization. He was promoted to the rank of Brigadeführer (major-general) in September 1936.

In Berlin, where he worked in the office of Karl Wolff, chief adjutant of the SS, Wiligut developed his plans for the rebuilding of the Wewelsburg into an allegorical "center of the world". Wiligut's friend Manfred von Knobelsdorff attempted to practise Wiligut's Irminism on the Wewelsburg. An Irministic 'baptism' of Karl Wolff's eldest son Thorisman was performed by Wiligut on 4 January 1937, attended by SS dignitaries Reinhard Heydrich and Karl Diebitsch.

In summer 1936, Gunther Kirchhoff and Wiligut, undertook a private 22-day expedition to the Murg Valley near Baden-Baden in the Black Forest, where there was a settlement described as consisting of "old half-timbered houses, architectural ornament, crosses, inscriptions, and natural and man-made rock formations in the forest," which, they claimed, showed it to be an ancient Krist settlement (Krist was a messianic Germanic figure allegedly associated with Irminism). Wiligut identified Schloss Eberstein as a center of Irminism. In Saxony, he discovered another "Irminist complex", identifying Einum as "spirit point", Bodenburg as "will point", Gandersheim as "central awareness point", Engelade as "force hand point", Kalefeld as "heart point" of the crucified Balder, Brunstein as "generative point", Naensen as "material hand point" and Ebergötzen as "skould point".

Wiligut contributed significantly to the development of Wewelsburg as the order-castle and ceremonial center of SS pseudo-religious practice. He designed the Totenkopfring, which Himmler personally awarded to prestigious SS officers.

After the Italian fascist and occultist Julius Evola visited Wewelsburg in 1938, where he proposed a secret order that would work towards a "Roman-Teutonic Empire", Himmler tasked Wiligut with investigating Evola's work and views. Wiligut delivered an unfavorable report that described Evola's vision as "utopian" and criticized his lack of knowledge of German history.

In November 1938, Karl Wolff, chief adjutant of Himmler's personal staff and the second-highest-ranking officer in the SS, visited Wiligut's wife and learned of Wiligut's earlier involuntary commitment to a mental institution. This proved embarrassing to Himmler and led to Wiligut's subsequent fall from power.

Wiligut's staff was notified that his "application" for retirement on grounds of age and poor health had been granted in February 1939, and the official retirement was dated 28 August 1939, only a few days prior to the outbreak of World War II. There is a fictional treatment of Wiligut's exposure and forced retirement in The Pale Criminal, the second volume of Philip Kerr's Berlin Noir trilogy.

== Death ==
Wiligut's final years were insecure: he moved to Aufkirchen in 1939, to Goslar in 1940, and to Wörthersee in 1943, and after the war to a refugee camp in St. Johann near Velden, where he had a stroke. After this he was permitted to return to Salzburg, but he soon moved on to Arolsen in Hesse, where he died on 3 January 1946. His gravestone is inscribed with "UNSER LEBEN GEHT DAHIN WIE EIN GESCHWÄTZ" ("Our Life Passes Away Like Idle Chatter").

== Occult involvement ==
In 1889, Wiligut joined the Schlaraffia, a quasi-masonic lodge. When he left the lodge in 1909, he held the rank of knight and the office of chancellor. His first book, Seyfrieds Runen, was a collection of poems about the Rabenstein at Znaim on the Austrian-Moravian border; it was published in 1903 under his full real, name and an added moniker, "Lobesam." His next book, Neun Gebote Gots, followed in 1908, in which Wiligut first claimed to be the heir to the ancient tradition of Irminism. Both List and Wiligut were influenced by Friedrich Fischbach's 1900 Die Buchstaben Gutenbergs. From 1908, Wiligut was in contact with the occult group Ordo Novi Templi in Vienna.

Wiligut claimed to be in the tradition of a long line of Germanic mystic teachers, reaching back into prehistoric times. He also claimed to have spiritual powers that allowed him direct access to genetic memories of his ancestors thousands of years in the past.

Wiligut was influenced by the "Aryo-Christian" ideas of Jörg Lanz von Liebenfels, which proclaimed a European origin of Christianity. Wiligut claimed that the Bible had originally been written in a Germanic language, and testified to an "Irminic" religion – Irminenreligion or Irminism – that contrasted with Guido von List's Wotanism. Wiligut identified Irminism as the true German ancestral religion, claiming that List's Wotanism and Armanen runes was a schismatic false religion. He claimed to worship a Germanic god "Krist", whom Christianity was supposed later to have appropriated as their own savior Christ.

According to Wiligut, Germanic culture and history reached back to 228,000 BC. He proposed that at this time, there were three suns, and Earth was inhabited by giants, dwarfs and other mythical creatures. Wiligut claimed that his ancestors, the Adler-Wiligoten, ended a long period of war. By 12,500 BC, the Irminic religion of Krist was revealed and from that time became the religion of all Germanic peoples, until the schismatic adherents of Wotanism gained the upper hand. In 1200 BC, the Wotanists succeeded in destroying the Irminic religious center at Goslar, following which the Irminists erected a new temple at the Externsteine, which was in turn appropriated by the Wotanists in AD 460. Wiligut's own ancestors were supposedly protagonists in this setting: the Wiligotis were Ueiskunings ("Ice kings") descending from a union of Aesir and Vanir. They founded the city of Vilna as the center of their Germanic empire and always remained true to their Irminic faith.

Wiligut's convictions assumed a paranoid trait in the 1920s as he became convinced that his family was the victim of a continuing persecution of Irminists, at present conducted by the Roman Catholic Church, the Jews, and the Freemasons, on which groups he also blamed the defeat of World War I and the downfall of the Habsburg Empire.

During the 1920s, Wiligut wrote down 38 verses (out of a number purportedly exceeding 1,000), the so-called Halgarita Sprüche, that he claimed to have memorized as a child, taught by his father. Wiligut had designed his own "runic alphabet" for this purpose.

Werner von Bülow and Emil Rüdiger of the Edda-Gesellschaft (Edda Society) translated and annotated these verses. They claimed that numbers 27 and 1818 are connected with the Black Sun. Verse number 27 according to Willigut is a 20,000-year-old "solar blessing":

Sunur saga santur toe Syntir peri fuir sprueh Wilugoti haga tharn Halga fuir santur toe

Werner von Bülow translates this as follows:

Legend tells, that two Suns, two wholesome in change-rule UR and SUN, alike to the hourglass which turned upside down ever gives one of these the victory / The meaning of the divine errant wandering way / dross star in fire's sphere became in fire-tongue revealed to the Earth-I-course of the race of Paradise / godwilling leaders lead to the weal through their care in universal course, what is visible and soon hidden, whence they led the imagination of mankind / polar in change-play, from UR to SUN in sacrificial service of waxing and waning, in holy fire Santur is ambiguously spent in sparks, but turns victorious to blessing.

Santur is interpreted as a burnt-out sun that was still visible at the time of Homer. Rüdiger speculates that this was the center of the Solar System hundreds of millennia ago, and he imagines a fight between the new and the old Suns that was decided 330,000 years ago. Santur is seen as the source of power of the Hyperboreans.

In esoteric currents of Neo-Nazism, Neofolk, National Socialist black metal and Neopaganism, Wiligut's writings enjoyed renewed interest in the 1990s.

== Runes ==
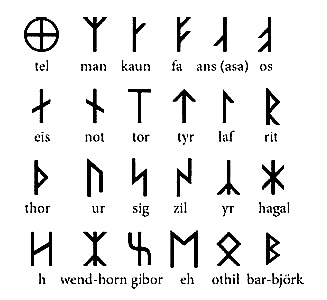

In 1934, Wiligut developed a rune row loosely based on the Armanen runes of Guido von List even though Wiligut rejected List's runes and his overall philosophy.

Wiligut claimed to have been initiated into "runic lore" by his grandfather Karl Wiligut (1794–1883). His rune row has 24 letters, like the Elder Futhark. Like von List's Armanen runes that are closely based on the Younger Futhark, many of Wiligut's runes are identical to historical runes, with some additions. The historical Futhark sequence is not preserved.

Wiligut's names for his runes are: Tel, Man, Kaun, Fa, Asa, Os, Eis, Not, Tor, Tyr, Laf, Rit, Thorn, Ur, Sig, Zil, Yr, Hag-Al, H, Wendehorn, Gibor, Eh, Othil, Bar-Bjork.

Runes without precedent in the historical runes are Tel (a crossed ring, similar to the sun cross symbol), Tor (like a Latin T), Zil (like a rotated Latin Z), Gibor (taken from von List's runes). The shape of Wendehorn is similar to Tvimadur.

== Awards and decorations ==
- Military Merit Cross, 3rd class with war decoration and Swords (Austria-Hungary)
- Military Merit Medal in Silver and in Bronze, on ribbon of the Military Merit Cross with Swords (Austria-Hungary)
- Military Jubilee Cross
- Jubilee Commemorative Medal
- Memorial Cross 1912/13
- Karl Troop Cross
- Wound Medal (Austria-Hungary)
- War Commemorative Medal (Austria) with Swords
- Anschluss Medal
- Sudetenland Medal
- War Merit Cross, 1st and 2nd class with Swords
- SS Honour Ring
- SS Honour Sword

== Works ==
- Wiligut, Karl Maria (2001). Moynihan, Michael (ed.). The Secret King: Karl Maria Wiligut, Himmler's Lord of the Runes. Translated by Stephen Flowers. Dominion. ISBN 1-885972-21-0.

== See also ==
- Occultism in Nazism
