= Armanen runes =

Set of modern runic letters created by Guido von List

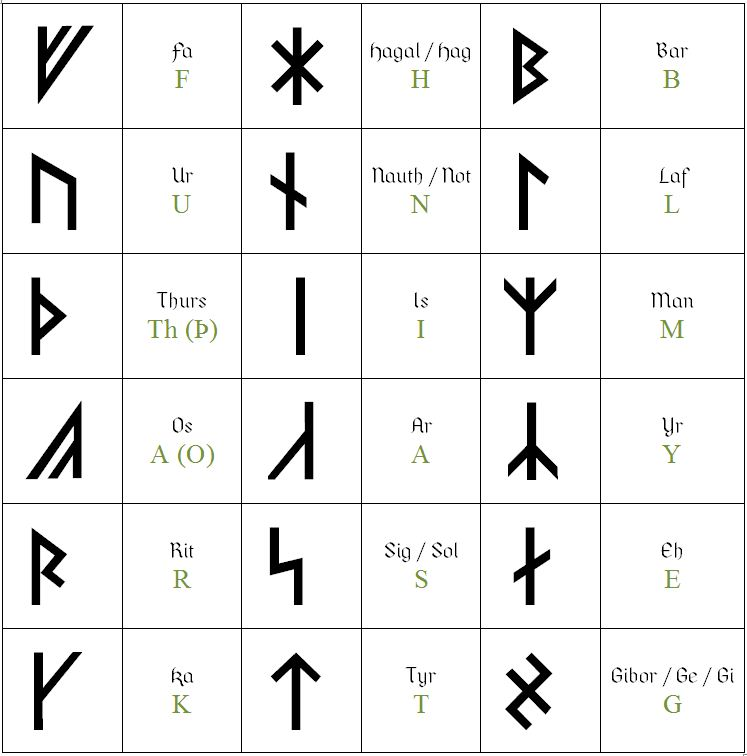
The Armanen runes and their transcriptions

The Armanen runes (or Armanen Futharkh) are 18 pseudo-runes, invented by Austrian mysticist and Germanic revivalist Guido von List in 1902. Inspired by the historic Younger Futhark runes, they were described in his Das Geheimnis der Runen ('The Secret of the Runes'); this was published as a periodical article in 1906, and as a standalone publication in 1908. The name seeks to associate the runes with the postulated Armanen, whom von List saw as ancient Aryan priest-kings. The runes are in use today in esotericism, in Germanic neopaganism and neonazism.

== Publication ==
Von List claimed the pseudo-runes were revealed to him while in an 11-month state of temporary blindness after a cataract operation on both eyes in 1902. This vision in 1902 allegedly opened what List referred to as his "inner eye", via which the "Secret of the Runes" was revealed to him. List stated that his Armanen Futharkh were encrypted in the Rúnatal of the Poetic Edda (stanzas 138 to 165 of the Hávamál), with stanzas 147 through 165, where Odin enumerates eighteen wisdoms (with 164 being an interpolation), interpreted as being the "song of the 18 runes". List and many of his followers believed his runes to represent the "primal runes" upon which all historical rune rows were based. The book was dedicated to his good friend Friedrich Wannieck and in the introduction, before his discussion of the runes, there is a copy of a correspondence between Wannieck and List.

Das Geheimnis der Runen was published in Leipzig and Vienna in 1908 by the Guido-von-List-Gesellschaft (Gross-Lichterfelde). It was also known as GLB 1 of the Guido-List-Bücherei (GLB) series.

The book was also published as a periodical article as "Das Geheimnis der Runen", "Neue Metaphysische Rundschau" [9] 13 (1906), 23-4, 75-87, 104-26.

An English language translation of the book was published in 1988 by Stephen E. Flowers.

== List of runes ==
Circular arrangement of the Armanen runes.

List's row is based on the Younger Futhark, with the names and sound values mostly close to the Anglo-Saxon Futhorc. The tenth rune ' Ar ', and the final "rune", Gibor, were added to the Younger Futhark inventory. The first was possibly taken from the Anglo-Saxon - ' Cen ' rune, inverted, so that the short 'leg' points to the left, rather than to the right, as it did in the original Anglo-Saxon runic alphabet. Or, more likely, from the Swedish Dalecarlian - ' Er ' rune (the only extant rune which looks exactly like it, and has a very similar sound value). The second, was a medieval German heraldic symbol, originally representing a wolf trap. The latter, had nothing at all to do with runes, until List 'made' it a "rune" by adding it to the inventory. Apart from the two additional runes, and a displacement of the Man rune from 13th to 15th place, the sequence is identical to that of the Younger Futhark.

List noted in his book, The Secret of the Runes, that the "runic futharkh (= runic ABC) consisted of sixteen symbols in ancient times." He also referred to the Armanen runes as the 'Armanen Futharkh' of which Stephen E. Flowers notes in his 1988 English translation of Lists 1907/08 'Das Geheimnis der Runen', that "The designation 'futharkh' is based on the first seven runes, namely F U T A R K H (or H) it is for this reason that the proper name is not futhark—as it is generally and incorrectly written—but rather 'futarkh', with the 'h' at the end."

The first sixteen of von List's runes correspond to the sixteen Younger Futhark runes, with slight modifications in names (and partly mirrored shapes). The two additional runes are loosely inspired by the Anglo-Saxon Futhorc.

No.	Name	Transliteration	Note
1.	Fa	F	an inverted Fe
2.	Ur	U	—
3.	Thurs	Th	also known as 'Dorn'; as Anglo-Saxon Thorn
4.	Os	A/O	a mirrored Younger Futhark As/Oss; in Armanic writings, the Othala rune is generally seen as a variation / extension of Os.
5.	Rit	R	as Reidh
6.	Ka	K	as in Younger Futhark
7.	Hagal/Hag	H	as Younger Futhark Hagall
8.	Nauth/Not	N	as Younger Futhark Naud
9.	Is	I	as in Younger Futhark
10.	Ar	A	similar to short-twig Younger Futhark
11.	Sig/Sol	S	as Anglo-Saxon Sigel
12.	Tyr	T	—
13.	Bar	B	as Younger Futhark Bjarkan
14.	Laf	L	as Younger Futhark Logr
15.	Man	M	as Younger Futhark Madr
16.	Yr	Y	as in Younger Futhark, but with a sound value [i]
17.	Eh	E	the name is from Anglo-Saxon Futhork, the shape like Younger Futhark Ar
18.	Gibor/Ge/Gi	G	the name similar to Anglo-Saxon Futhork Gyfu

=== Gibor rune ===
There is no historical runic equivalent to the 18th rune, the "gibor rune" (the name may be based on the Anglo-Saxon Gyfu rune).

Its shape is similar to that of the Wolfsangel symbol, which sometimes leads to the mistaken conclusion that the Wolfsangel is linked to the ancient runic alphabet.

List associated his Gibor rune with the final stanza of the Rúnatal (stanza 165 of the Hávamál, trans. H. A. Bellows):

An eighteenth I know, / that ne'er will I tell
To maiden or wife of man, [lacuna]
The best is what none / but one's self doth know

== Connection to völkisch ideology ==
List's book is seminal to later currents of Germanic mysticism and Nazi occultism. The Armanen runes were employed for magical purposes in works by authors such as Friedrich Bernhard Marby and Siegfried Adolf Kummer, and after World War II in a reformed "pansophical" system by Karl Spiesberger. More recently, Stephen Flowers, Adolf Schleipfer, Larry E. Camp and others also build on List's system. The book also remains popular in German Neo-Nazism, with a reprint published by Adolf Schleipfer of the "Armanen-Orden".

During the 19th century, interest in the runic alphabets (such as the academic discipline of runology) was revived in Germany by the völkisch movement, which promoted interest in Germanic folklore and language in a reaction against the rapid modernisation of the German Empire under Kaiser Wilhelm I. The collapse of Wilhelmine Germany at the end of the First World War led to an upsurge of interest in völkisch ideology, which rejected liberalism, democracy, socialism and industrial capitalism—all traits reflected in the political system of Weimar Germany—as "un-German", subversive Jewish influences.

By the end of the war (1918) there were about seventy-five völkisch groups in Germany, promoting a variety of pseudo-historical, mystical, racial and anti-semitic views. This had a major influence on the embryonic Nazi Party; Hitler wrote in his 1925 book Mein Kampf that "the basic ideas of the National Socialist movement are völkisch and the völkisch ideas are National Socialist."

List's work led to the adoption of his "Armanen runes" by the Völkisch movement, which had already adopted the swastika as a symbol of Germanic antiquity, and from there List's runes became an integral part of German and Austrian nationalistic socialist symbology. Heinrich Himmler, who led the SS from 1929 to 1945, was one of many leading Nazi figures associated with the Thule Society völkisch group, and his interest in Germanic mysticism led him to adopt a variety of List's runes for the SS. Some had already been adopted by members of the SS and its predecessor organisations but Himmler systematised their use throughout the SS. Until 1939, members of the Allgemeine SS were given training in runic symbolism on joining the organisation.

Runic signs were used from the 1920s to 1945 on SS flags, uniforms and other items as symbols of various aspects of Nazi ideology and Germanic mysticism. They also represented virtues seen as desirable in SS members, and were based on The Runes order designed by Karl Maria Wiligut which he loosely based on the historical runic alphabets.

== Use in contemporary esotericism ==
Cover of the new German reprint published by Adolf Schleipfer

After World War II, Karl Spiesberger reformed the system, removing the racist aspects of the Listian, Marbyan and Kummerian rune work and placing the whole system in a "pansophical", or eclectic, context. In recent times Karl Hans Welz, Stephen E. Flowers, A. D. Mercer, and Larry E. Camp and have all furthered the effort to remove any racist connotations previously espoused by pre-war Armanen rune masters.

In German-speaking countries, the Armanen Runes have been influential among rune-occultists. According to Stephen E. Flowers they are better known even than the historical Elder Futhark:

The personal force of List and that of his extensive and influential Armanen Orden was able to shape the runic theories of German magicians...from that time to the present day. [...] the Armanen system of runes...by 1955 had become almost "traditional" in German circles

The Armanen runes also have a significant impact in English language occultist literature.

== See also ==
- Rudolf John Gorsleben
- Siegfried Adolf Kummer
- Jörg Lanz von Liebenfels
- Runic divination
- Peryt Shou
- Karl Maria Wiligut
- Wiligut runes
- Esotericism in Germany and Austria

== Sources ==
- Flowers, Stephen E. 1992. Rune Might: Secret Practices of the German Rune Magicians. ISBN 0-87542-778-2
- ——— (as Edred Thorsson). 1984. Futhark: A Handbook of Rune Magic. York Beach, Maine: Samuel Weiser, Inc. ISBN 0-87728-548-9
- ——— (as Edred Thorsson). Runecaster's Handbook, Northern Magic, Runelore.
- Goodrick-Clarke, Nicholas. 1993. The Occult Roots of Nazism: Secret Aryan Cults and Their Influence on Nazi Ideology. ISBN 0-8147-3060-4
- ———. 2003. Black Sun: Aryan Cults, Esoteric Nazism, and the Politics of Identity. ISBN 0-8147-3155-4
- von List, Guido. 1902. Das Geheimnis der Runen. Vienna. (Translated into English by Stephen E. Flowers, 1988, Destiny Books. ISBN 0-89281-207-9)
- Mercer, A. D. 2015. Runa - Wisdom of the Runes (Second edition) 2023, Troy Books
- Pennick, Nigel. 1992. Secrets of the Runes: Discover the Magic of the Ancient Runic Alphabet. ISBN 0-7225-3784-0
- von Schnurbein, Stefanie. 1992. Religion als Kulturkritik.
