= Esotericism in Germany and Austria =

Overview of esoteric movements in Germany and Austria

Germany and Austria have spawned many movements and practices in Western esotericism, including Rosicrucianism, Theosophy, Anthroposophy and Ariosophy, among others.

== Early Esotericism ==
=== Knights Templar and Freemasonry ===
The original Knights Templar, founded around 1119, had been a crusading military order, that, at some time, had established financial networks across the whole of Christendom. In 1307, King Philip IV of France mounted a "slanderous campaign" to strip the Order of its economic and political influence. The Templars were accused of Satanic practices, perversions and blasphemy and ruthlessly suppressed; Its leaders were burned on March 18, 1314. The circumstances of their suppression gave rise to legends surrounding the Knights Templar. In Germany, "where the growth of deviant Masonic rites was greatest," the Templar heritage was adopted for irregular Freemasonry. (Freemasonry had been officially founded in England in 1717.)

The idea of chivalric Freemasonry first occurred ca. 1737 in France. In 1775, Baron Gotthelf von Hund (1722–76) founded the Order of Strict Observance, claiming the possession of secret Templar documents which allegedly prove that his order represented the legal Templar succession.

=== Rosicrucianism ===
In the 17th century and 18th century, Rosicrucian ideas flourished in varying degrees. Rosicrucianism goes back to the beginning of the 17th century, when three works by Johann Valentin Andreae were printed at Kassel. One of these works, the Chymische Hochzeit, appears to be an alchemical tract, while the other two (for which the authorship of Valentin Andreae is not finally proven) announce the existence of the Rosicrucian Order, which desires a "universal and general reformation of the whole world". Putatively this order was founded by Christian Rosenkreutz, who is supposed to have lived from 1378 to 1484.

In either 1747 or 1757, a quasi-masonic Rosicrucian order of the name Gold- und Rosenkreuz was founded in Berlin, having a 9-grade hierarchy based on the cabalistic Tree of Life; This organisation included King Frederick William II of Prussia and Johann Christoph von Wöllner as members.

== German occult revival, 1880–1910 ==
The modern German occult revival owes its inception to the popularity of Theosophy in the Anglo-Saxon world during the 1880s.

=== Theosophy ===
The first German Theosophical Society was established in July 1884, under the presidency of Wilhelm Hübbe-Schleiden, a conservative German nationalist turned spiritual seeker who sought to establish Theosophy on a "scientific" basis. Between 1886 and 1895 Hübbe-Schleiden published the monthly periodical Die Sphinx. In Vienna, a Theosophical Society was founded in 1887, its president was Friedrich Eckstein. Among his circle at this time Franz Hartmann, a leader of Theosophical work who emphasized personal spiritual experience, and the young Rudolf Steiner were members. A German Theosophical Society, as a branch of the International Theosophical Brotherhood, then was established in 1896 when the American Theosophists around William Quan Judge, Katherine Tingley, E. T. Hargrove and C. F. Wright travelled through Europe. Its president was Franz Hartmann, who also founded a Theosophical lay-monastery at Ascona in 1889. His periodical Lotusblüten (Lotus Blossoms, 1892–1900) was the first German publication to use the Theosophical swastika on its cover.

Hartmann's example provided the impetus for Paul Zillmann to found the Metaphysische Rundschau (Metaphysical Review) in 1896.

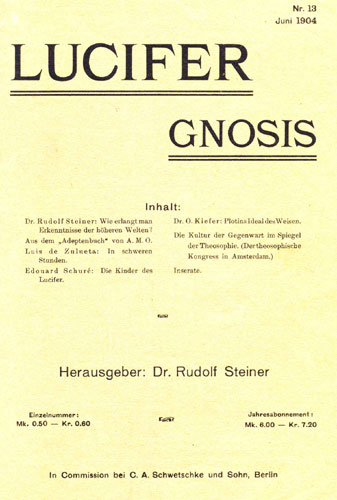
Cover of the June 1904 edition of Lucifer-Gnosis

Rudolf Steiner was made general secretary of the German Theosophical Society in 1902. Steiner, who was seeking to develop an esoteric path suitable for the modern era, and professed commitment to scientific methodology, was yet oriented towards awakening spiritual experiences in each individual rather than depending upon authorities or gurus. He published Luzifer at Berlin from 1903 to 1908.

In Vienna, there also existed an Association for Occultism, connected to a person called Philipp Maschlufsky. From 1903 he published a periodical called Die Gnosis, that was later absorbed by Rudolf Steiner's periodical Luzifer, and renamed Lucifer-Gnosis.

"It may have been a desire to counter Steiner's influence in the occult subculture which led Hartmann to encourage the publication of several new periodicals." A Theosophical Publishing House was established by Hugo Vollrath in Leipzig in 1906. Among the magazines published there was Prana (1909–19), initially edited by Karl Brandler-Pracht and later edited by Johannes Balzli. Before that, a publisher with the name Wilhelm Friedrich had already published the works of Hartmann and Hübbe-Schleiden, as well as translations of the English Theosophists at Leipzig. Wilhelm Friedrich had also published the occult works of Max Ferdinand Sebaldt von Werth (1859–1916). Initially, this author had collaborated with Moritz von Egidy on the periodical Das angewande Christentum (Applied Christianity), but later he wrote volumes on "the sexual-religion of the Aryans", thus, in the opinion of Goodrick-Clarke, anticipating Ariososophy.

=== Anthroposophy ===
From 1907 (at latest), tensions between Rudolf Steiner and the Theosophical Society grew steadily. In 1912, Rudolf Steiner broke away to found Anthroposophy. There were two causes of the break; Steiner's European and Christian orientation had long been distinct from the hinduistic interest of the theosophists under the leadership of Annie Besant. More immediately, Steiner publicly distanced himself from Besant's promotion of Jiddu Krishnamurti as a supposed new messiah. Steiner and a group of prominent German Theosophists officially founded the Anthroposophical Society in December 1913, the vast majority of the German membership of the Theosophical Society following them into the new group; the breakaways were excluded from the Theosophical Society in January 1914.

=== Guido von List and Jörg Lanz von Liebenfels ===
Living in Vienna, Guido (von) List (1848–1919) had been active as journalist and writer. After he turned to esotericism, he became the first popular author to combine völkisch ideology and occultism into the type of esoteric doctrine that is now collectively labelled Ariosophy. In September 1903 the occult periodical Die Gnosis (see above) included an article by List, in which he, referring Sebaldt von Werth, started to articulate "a Germanic occult religion". In the following decade, List continued to work on this topic, also making references to the works of Madame Blavatsky and William Scott-Elliot. In his concept of Armanism, the religion of the theocratic elite in his image of the ancient Germanic past, List borrowed material from Freemasonry and Rosicrucianism. Since his manuscript, proposing the research into the runes by the "means of occult insight", was rejected from the Imperial Academie of Sciences in Vienna, the supporters of List formed a List Society (Guido-von-List-Gesellschaft) to finance his research. The Society was founded officially on 2 March 1908. Its members included völkisch authors as well as occultists (for example Franz Hartmann and the complete membership of the Vienna Theosophical Society). Some inner members of the List Society participated in the activities of the Hoher Armanen-Orden (High Armanen-Order). This order, however, achieved no significance as a lodge-like organisation.

Jörg Lanz (von Liebenfels) (1874–1954) had been a cistercian monk between 1893 and 1899. In 1903 he published a long article "Anthropozoon biblicum" in the Vierteljahrsschrift für Bibelkunde, a periodical for biblical research. By 1905 his studies in this direction had cumulated into the book Theozoologie, a "strange amalgam" of traditional Judaeo-Christian sources and contemporary life-sciences. Among other things, Lanz proposed a "frequently obscene and always radical" interpretation of the Bible, according to which it had been the purpose of the Old Testament to warn the Aryan race against interbreeding with Pygmies. In 1905 Lanz also established his own magazine, Ostara. One of the few other contributors to this magazine beside Lanz himself was the Theosophist Harald Grävell von Jostenoode (1856–1932), who also edited one number of Lotusblüten.

=== Astrology ===
Among the Theosophists, astrology enjoyed a revival. Astrological texts by Karl Brandler-Pracht, Otto Pöllner, Ernst Tiede, and Albert Knief appeared at the Theosophical Publishing House at Leipzig. Karl Brandler-Pracht had also founded the First Viennese Astrological Society in 1907. Erik Jan Hanussen, who later would become the most famous clairvoyant in Germany and Austria, gave his first occult session with E. K. Hermann in Vienna in 1911.

=== Other developments ===
The German and Vienna occult subculture was well developed before the First World War. Aside from the developments mentioned above, there are some more of interest:

"The Ordo Templi Orientis (OTO) originated in the irregular masonic activities of Theodor Reuss, Franz Hartmann, and Karl Kellner between 1895 and 1906." Theodor Reuss had been in contact with William Wescott, a founding member of the Hermetic Order of the Golden Dawn.

Ernst Wachler was a völkisch author (he supported the Guido von List Society) who had founded an open-air Germanic theatre in the Harz mountains. This theatre, called Green Stage (Grüne Bühne), was closed in 1937.

The Germanische Glaubens-Gemeinschaft, founded in 1907, is claimed by current Germanic Neopaganism groups as predecessor. It was founded and led by the painter Ludwig Fahrenkrog. Since 1908, the group used the swastika as its symbol. After 1938 the use of the swastika became prohibited and the group was no longer allowed to hold public meetings. However, unlike many other esoteric groups in Nazi Germany, the GGG was not forced to disband, partly "because of Fahrenkrog's international status as an artist."

== Interbellum Weimar Republic ==
=== Ariosophy, Ordo Novi Templi, and Lumenclub ===
Lanz had coined the term Ariosophy, meaning occult wisdom concerning the Aryans, in 1915. In the 1920s he then used this label for his doctrine. Both List and Lanz greeted World War I as a millenarian struggle. Guido von List wrote his research reports on the "Aryo-Germanics" (Ario-Germanen) between 1908 and 1913, but in 1917 two later articles written by him appeared in Prana. He died 1919 in Berlin. The List Society was continued after his death, but not much is known of its activities. By contrast, an organisation founded around 1907 by Lanz von Liebenfels achieved more significance: the "new Templar lodge", called Ordo Novi Templi (ONT) (German: Neutempler-Orden).

On 11 November 1932, influenced by Ariosophy, an industrialist with the name Johann Walthari Wölfl also founded an association called the Lumenclub in Vienna, which overlapped in membership with the ONT. The ideological sympathy of the Lumenclub to Nazism is beyond question, as it acted as growth centre for the Nazi party that was illegal in Austria since 1934. Nevertheless, they were later suppressed like other esoteric groups. After the Anschluss in 1938, Lanz von Liebenfels had his writings banned. The Lumenclub and the ONT were suppressed by the Gestapo in March 1942, following the party edict of December 1938 that applied to many sectarian groups.

Werner von Bülow and Herbert Reichstein had applauded the advent of the third reich in their esoteric magazines.

==== Rune occultism ====
Influenced by Guido von List and Lanz von Liebenfels (see Ariosophy), a new "Aryan occultist movement" was started after 1918 in Germany by Rudolf John Gorsleben.

Since the esoteric importance of the runes (that first had been developed by Guido von List, see Armanen runes) was central to his world-view, Goodrick-Clarke speaks in this context of "rune occultism".

Here two authors stand out, as they engaged the runes in "a less explicitly Aryan racist context". Friedrich Bernhard Marby and Siegfried Adolf Kummer focused more on the practical side of rune occultism. In 1936, Friedrich Bernhard Marby was arrested and sent to a concentration camp (Flossenbürg and later Dachau). He survived and resumed his occult research after the war. Responsible for his incarceration might have been Karl Maria Wiligut, who was Himmler's counsellor on the occult. (see: Nazi occultism) Willigut was of the opinion that Marby (and also Kummer) were bringing "the holy Aryan heritage into disrepute and ridicule". Wiligut also had identified Irminism as the true ancestral religion, claiming that Guido von List's Wotanism and runic row was a schismatic false religion, but this does seem to be unconnected to the arrest of Marby.

Other measures against esoteric groups were most probably the result of the general Nazi policy of suppressing lodge organizations.

=== Other developments ===
In the years following the military defeat, there was a burgeoning occult movement in Germany, and Austria. Significant figures in this milieu were Gustav Meyring, Franz Spunda and Peryt Shou.

== Esotericism in Nazi Germany ==
=== German Faith Movement ===
The German Faith Movement led by Jakob Wilhelm Hauer during 1933–1945 propagated a move away from Christianity towards an "Aryan–Nordic religion", partly inspired by Hinduism.

=== Suppression of Freemasonry and esotericism ===
The suppression of Freemasonry in Nazi Germany also reached the level of outright persecution. It is estimated that between 80,000 and 200,000 Freemasons were murdered under the Nazi regime. The lodge Liberté chérie was founded in a concentration camp. Freemasons, who were sent to concentration camps, were sent there as political prisoners, and consequently forced to wear an inverted red triangle. (see: Nazi concentration camp badges)

Within the Nazi ideology it was alleged that Freemasonry was part of "the Jewish conspiracy". Since many esoteric groups emulated the lodge structure of Freemasonry, they were "caught in the National Socialist anti-Masonic law of 1935". Even "the German Order of Druids" was closed down, "protesting to the last that they were not Freemasons but good, German Druids." In her biography of Richard Walther Darré, the historian Anna Bramwell also remarks that a secret society called the Skald Order "was banned by the Nazis after 1933 because of its allegedly masonic nature." Several members of the Skald held office in the Third Reich, including Dr Ludolf Haase (a founder member of the Skald), Herbert Backe and Theo Gross; all came under covert investigation, though Backe is said to have been cleared of disloyalty by Heydrich from his deathbed.

Whether the Nazi ideology had a special view concerning the various esoteric doctrines (aside from confusing them with Freemasonry) is not clear. Concerning Anthroposophy, a book whose title denounced Rudolf Steiner as a fraud (Schwindler) and a false prophet had been published by Gregor Schwartz-Bostunitsch in 1930. Schwartz-Bostunitsch had been an "enthusiastic Anthroposophist" from 1923, but was disaffected by 1929 and later joined the SS.

Astrology was officially interdicted in Nazi Germany after 1938. However, the Nazis had sympathizing astrologers write favourable interpretations of Nostradamus for psychological warfare, and as late as 1936 Hitler personally sent a greetings telegram to an international astrologer's congress that was taking place in Düsseldorf.

The full focus of the state was not aimed at religious groups until 9 June 1941 when Reinhard Heydrich, the head of the security police, banned lodge organizations and esoteric groups in the wake of the flight to Scotland by Rudolf Hess, who had been attracted and influenced by the organic farming theories of Rudolf Steiner and Anthroposophy. However, the suppression of esoteric organisations began very soon after the Nazis acquired governmental power. Dr. Anna Bramwell points out that "occultist racialists were banned as early as 1934."

Allegedly, the stage magician and occultist Franz Bardon had attracted the notice of Adolf Hitler "like other workers for the Light" and was incarcerated in a concentration camp for three and a half months in 1945.

=== Later developments in Nazi esotericism ===
The Thule Society was dissolved still in the 1920s, well before Hitler's rise to power, and the anti-Masonic legislation of 1935 closed down esoteric organisations including völkisch occultist ones.

Karl Maria Wiligut, the chief occultist influence on the Nazi establishment, retired in 1939. Alfred Rosenberg, whose 1930 Myth of the Twentieth Century had been important in the foundation of Nazi racist ideology, and Heinrich Himmler, who added a number of occultist "design elements" to the Schutzstaffel, did remain high ranking party members throughout the war. Himmler's mystic tendencies can be seen in the Ahnenerbe organization and the Wewelsburg castle.

According to their private writings, the leaders of the Nazi Party in Germany did not wish to encourage forms of paganism which did not serve to further their goals of promoting pan-Germanic ethnic consciousness.

Already in 1927, Hitler had fired the Gauleiter of Thüringen, Artur Dinter, from his post because he wanted too much to make a religion of Aryan racial purity. In 1928, Dinter was expelled from the party when he publicly attacked Hitler about this decision.

Rudolf von Sebottendorff had been involved in the Thule Society. In January 1933 he published Bevor Hitler kam: Urkundlich aus der Frühzeit der Nationalsozialistischen Bewegung (Before Hitler Came: Documents from the Early Days of the National Socialist Movement). Nazi authorities disliked the book, which was banned in the following year. Sebottendorff was arrested but managed to flee to Turkey.

=== Esotericists in Nazi Germany ===
- Karl Spiesberger
- Ludwig Straniak
- Wilhelm Wulff
- A. Frank Glahn
- Karl Maria Wiligut
- Carl Reichenbach
- Hellmut Wolff
- Karl Ernst Krafft

== After 1945 ==
Other than popular Western astrology, there is also a school of thought regarding Germanic Runic Astrology and its usage in divination within the northern tradition of Odinism.

The work of Friedrich Bernhard Marby was continued by Rudolf Arnold Spieth, who also published one of his works posthumously.

A revival of Neopaganism in Germany and Austria began in the 1970s. Since the 1980s, mainstream esotericism in German-speaking Europe has been dominated by generic New Age syncretism as it developed in the United States.

During the COVID pandemic, Anthroposophy followers met for "walks" with anti-vaxxers and the alt-right to protest government regulations. Anthroposophy has "a proximity to the mindset of conspiracy theorists", according to Helmut Zander.

== Literature ==
- Anna Bramwell. 1985. Blood and Soil: Richard Walther Darré and Hitler's 'Green Party'. Abbotsbrook, England: The Kensal Press. ISBN 0-946041-33-4
- Nicholas Goodrick-Clarke. 1985. The Occult Roots of Nazism: Secret Aryan Cults and Their Influence on Nazi Ideology: The Ariosophists of Austria and Germany, 1890-1935. Wellingborough, England: The Aquarian Press. ISBN 0-85030-402-4.
- Giorgio Galli, Hitler e il nazismo magico, Biblioteca Universale Rizzoli, Italy, published in Rome (2005), pages 301, ISBN 9788817006347.
- Pösl, Nora Feline (2020). Von Homöopathie und Handauflegen zur Hassideologie? zum Verhältnis von alternativen Heilmethoden zu Verschwörungstheorien, Esoterik und rechten Ideologien (in German). Hamburg. ISBN 978-3-96146-757-0. OCLC 1192534794.
