= Religious aspects of Nazism =

Historians, political scientists and philosophers have studied Nazism with a specific focus on its religious and pseudo-religious aspects. It has been debated whether Nazism would constitute a political religion, and there has also been research on the millenarian, messianic, and occult or esoteric aspects of Nazism.

== Nazism as a political religion ==
Before 1980, the writers who alluded to the religious aspects of Nazism included Aurel Kolnai, Raymond Aron, Albert Camus, Romano Guardini, Denis de Rougemont, Eric Voegelin, George Mosse, Klaus Vondung and Friedrich Heer. Voegelin's work on political religion was first published in German in 1938. Emilio Gentile and Roger Griffin, among others, have drawn on his concept.

=== Nazism and Christianity ===
The Nazi Party program of 1920 included a statement on religion which was numbered point 24. In this statement, the Nazi party demands freedom of religion (for all religious denominations that are not opposed to the customs and moral sentiments of the Germanic race); the paragraph proclaims the party's endorsement of Positive Christianity. Historians have described this statement as "a tactical measure, 'cleverly' left undefined in order to accommodate a broad range of meanings," and an "ambiguous phraseology." However, Richard Steigmann-Gall in The Holy Reich holds that, on closer examination, "Point 24 readily provides us with three key ideas in which the Nazis claimed that their movement was Christian": the movement's antisemitism, its social ethic under the phrase Gemeinnutz vor Eigennutz (literally, "public benefit before private benefit") and its attempt to bridge the confessional divide between Catholicism and Protestantism in Germany.

This is a topic of some controversy. Conway holds that The Holy Reich has broken new ground in the examination of the relation between Nazism and Christianity, despite his view that "Nazism and Christianity were incompatible." Conway claims that Steigmann-Gall "is undeniably right to point out how much Nazism owed to German Christian" concepts and only considers his conclusion as "overdrawn".

Hitler admired Martin Luther, the leading figure of the Protestant Reformation. While Luther's antisemitism has been identified as an inspiration for Nazism, surfacing in 1930s works of propaganda, including an antisemitic children's book, others suggest that its role is less significant. For example, Hans J. Hillerbrand asserts that the focus on Luther's influence on Nazism's antisemitism ignores other factors in German history.

The Nazis were aided by theologians, such as Dr. Ernst Bergmann. Bergmann, in his work, Die 25 Thesen der Deutschreligion (Twenty-five Points of the German Religion), expounded the theory that the Old Testament and portions of the New Testament of the Bible were inaccurate. He proposed that Jesus was of Aryan origin, and believed that Hitler was the new messiah.

After Nazi Germany surrendered at the end of World War II in Europe, the U.S. Office of Strategic Services published a report which was titled "The Nazi Master Plan: The Persecution of the Christian Churches". Historians and theologians generally agree that the objective of the Nazi policy towards religion was to remove explicitly Jewish content from the Bible (i.e., the Old Testament, the Gospel of Matthew, and the Pauline Epistles), transforming the Christian faith into a new religion, completely cleansed from any Jewish element and conciliate it with Nazism, Völkisch ideology and Führerprinzip.

Alfred Rosenberg was influential in the development of Positive Christianity. In The Myth of the Twentieth Century, he wrote that:

- Saint Paul was responsible for the destruction of the racial values which existed in Greek and Roman culture;
- the dogma of hell which was advanced in the Middle Ages destroyed the free Nordic spirit;
- original sin and grace are Oriental ideas which corrupt the purity and strength of Nordic blood;
- the Old Testament and the Jewish race are not an exception and one should return to the Nordic peoples' fables and legends;
- Jesus was not Jewish, because he had Nordic blood which he had inherited from his Amorite ancestors.

=== Nazism and occultism ===
Outside a purely academic discourse, public interest mainly concerns the relationship between Nazism and occultism, and the relationship between Nazism and Christianity. The interest in the first relationship is obvious from the modern popular theory of Nazi occultism. The persistent idea that the Nazis were directed by occult agencies has been dismissed by historians as modern cryptohistory.

There are many works that speculate about Nazism and occultism, the most prominent being The Morning of the Magicians (1960) and The Spear of Destiny (1972). From the perspective of academic history, however, most of these works are "cryptohistory". Notable exceptions are Der Mann, der Hitler die Ideen gab (The man who gave Hitler the ideas) by Wilfried Daim (1957), Urania's children by Ellic Howe (1967) and The Occult Establishment by James Webb (1976). Aside from these works, historians did not consider the question until the 1980s. Due to the popular literature on the topic, "Nazi 'black magic' was regarded as a topic for sensational authors in pursuit of strong sales." In the 1980s, two Ph.D. theses were written about the topic. Nicholas Goodrick-Clarke published The Occult Roots of Nazism (1985) based on his thesis, and the German librarian and historian Ulrich Hunger's thesis on rune-lore in Nazi Germany (Die Runenkunde im Dritten Reich) was published in the series Europäische Hochschulschriften (also 1985).

Goodrick-Clarke's book The Occult Roots... is not only considered "without exception" to be the pioneering work on Ariosophy, but also the "definitive book" on the topic. The term 'Ariosophy' refers to an esoteric movement in Germany and Austria of the 1900s to 1930s influenced by the Western esoteric tradition, thereby falling under Goodrick-Clarke's definition of occultism. Ideologically, it was remarkably similar to Nazism. According to Goodrick-Clarke, the Ariosophists wove occult ideas into the völkisch ideology that existed in Germany and Austria at the time. Ariosophy shared the racial awareness of völkisch ideology, but also drew upon a notion of root races, postulating locations such as Atlantis, Thule and Hyperborea as the original homeland of the Aryan race (and its "purest" branch, the Teutons or Germanic peoples). The Ariosophic writings described a glorious ancient Germanic past, in which an elitist priesthood "expounded occult-racist doctrines and ruled over a superior and racially pure society." The downfall of this imaginary Golden Age was explained as the result of the interbreeding between the master race and the untermenschen (lesser races). The "abstruse ideas and weird cults [of Ariosophy] anticipated the political doctrines and institutions of the Third Reich", but direct influences are sparse: with the exception of Karl Maria Wiligut, no evidence has been found that prominent Ariosophists directly influenced Nazism.

== Religious beliefs of leading Nazis ==
Within a large movement like Nazism, it may not be especially shocking to discover that individuals could embrace different ideological systems that would seem to be polar opposites. The religious beliefs of even the leading Nazis diverged strongly.

The difficulty for historians lies in the task of evaluating not only the public but also the private statements of the Nazi politicians. Steigmann-Gall, who intended to do this in his study, points to such people as Erich Koch (who was not only Gauleiter of East Prussia and Reichskommissar of Reichskommissariat Ukraine but also the elected praeses of the East Prussian provincial synod of the Evangelical Church of the old-Prussian Union) and Bernhard Rust as examples of Nazi politicians who also professed to be Christian in private.

=== Hitler's religious views ===
Hitler's religious beliefs have been a matter of debate; the wide consensus of historians considers him to have been irreligious, anti-Christian, anti-clerical and scientistic. In light of evidence such as his fierce criticism and vocal rejection of the tenets of Christianity, numerous private statements to confidants denouncing Christianity as a harmful superstition, and his strenuous efforts to reduce the influence and independence of Christianity in Germany after he came to power, Hitler's major academic biographers conclude that he was irreligious and an opponent of Christianity. Historian Laurence Rees found no evidence that "Hitler, in his personal life, ever expressed belief in the basic tenets of the Christian church". Ernst Hanfstaengl, a friend from his early days in politics, says Hitler "was to all intents and purposes an atheist by the time I got to know him". However, historians such as Richard Weikart and Alan Bullock doubt the assessment that he was a true atheist, suggesting that despite his dislike of Christianity, he still clung to a form of spiritual belief.

Hitler was born to a practising Catholic mother and was baptised into the Roman Catholic Church. In 1904, acquiescing to his mother's wish, he was confirmed at the Roman Catholic Cathedral in Linz, Austria, where the family lived. According to John Willard Toland, witnesses indicate that Hitler's confirmation sponsor had to "drag the words out of him ... almost as though the whole confirmation was repugnant to him". Rissmann notes that, according to several witnesses who lived with Hitler in a men's home in Vienna, Hitler never again attended Mass or received the sacraments after leaving home. Several eyewitnesses who lived with Hitler while he was in his late teens and early-to-mid 20s in Vienna state that he never attended church after leaving home at 18.

In Hitler's early political statements, he attempted to express himself to the German public as a Christian. In public speeches prior to and in the early years of his rule, he described himself as a Christian. Hitler and the Nazi party promoted Positive Christianity, which rejected most traditional Christian doctrines such as the divinity of Jesus, as well as Jewish elements such as the Old Testament (Hebrew Bible). In one widely quoted remark, he described Jesus as an "Aryan fighter" who struggled against "the power and pretensions of the corrupt Pharisees" and "Jewish materialism".

While a small minority of historians accept these publicly stated views as genuine expressions of his spirituality, the vast majority believe that Hitler was skeptical of religion and anti-Christian, but recognized that he could only be elected and preserve his political power if he feigned a commitment to and belief in Christianity, which the overwhelming majority of Germans believed in. Privately, Hitler repeatedly deprecated Christianity, and told confidants that his reluctance to make public attacks on the Church was not a matter of principle, but a pragmatic political move. In April 1941, Nazi Propaganda Minister Joseph Goebbels privately wrote in his diaries that although Hitler was "a fierce opponent" of the Vatican and Christianity, "he forbids me to leave the church. For tactical reasons." Hitler's remarks to confidants, as described by Goebbels, in the memoirs of Albert Speer, and transcripts of Hitler's private conversations recorded by Martin Bormann in Hitler's Table Talk, are further evidence of his irreligious and anti-Christian beliefs; these sources record a number of private remarks in which Hitler ridicules Christian doctrine as absurd, contrary to scientific advancement, and socially destructive.

Once in office, Hitler and his regime sought to reduce the influence of Christianity on society. From the mid-1930s, his government was increasingly dominated by militant anti-church proponents like Goebbels, Bormann, Heinrich Himmler, Alfred Rosenberg and Reinhard Heydrich, whom Hitler appointed to key posts. These anti-church radicals were generally permitted or encouraged to perpetrate the Nazi persecutions of the churches. The regime launched an effort toward coordination of German Protestants under a unified Protestant Reich Church—this was resisted by the Confessing Church)—and moved early to eliminate political Catholicism. Hitler agreed to the Reich concordat with the Vatican, but then routinely ignored it and permitted Nazi persecution of the Catholic Church. Smaller religious minorities faced harsher repression, with the Jews of Germany expelled for extermination on the grounds of Nazi racial ideology. Jehovah's Witnesses were ruthlessly persecuted for refusing both military service and allegiance to Hitler's movement. Hitler said he anticipated a coming collapse of Christianity in the wake of scientific advances, and that Nazism and religion could not co-exist long term. Although he was prepared to delay conflicts for political reasons, historians conclude that he ultimately intended the destruction of Christianity in Germany, or at least its distortion or subjugation to a Nazi outlook.

=== Rudolf Hess ===
According to Goodrick-Clarke, Rudolf Hess had been a member of the Thule Society before attaining prominence in the Nazi party. As Adolf Hitler's official deputy, Hess had also been attracted to and influenced by the biodynamic agriculture of Rudolf Steiner and anthroposophy. In the wake of his flight to Scotland, Reinhard Heydrich, the head of the security police, banned lodge organizations and esoteric groups on 9 June 1941.

== Thule Society and the origins of the Nazi Party ==
The Thule Society, which is remotely connected to the origins of the Nazi Party, was one of the ariosophic groups of the late 1910s. Thule Gesellschaft had initially been the name of the Munich branch of the Germanenorden Walvater of the Holy Grail, a lodge-based organisation which was built up by Rudolf von Sebottendorff in 1917. For this task he had received about a hundred addresses of potential members in Bavaria from Hermann Pohl, and from 1918 he was also supported by Walter Nauhaus. According to an account by Sebottendorff, the Bavarian province of the Germanenorden Walvater had 200 members in spring 1918, which had risen to 1500 in autumn 1918, of these 250 in Munich. Five rooms, capable of accommodating 300 people, were leased from the fashionable Hotel Vierjahreszeiten ('Four Seasons') in Munich and decorated with the Thule emblem showing a dagger superimposed on a swastika. Since the lodge's ceremonial activities were accompanied by overtly right-wing meetings, the name Thule Gesellschaft was adopted to arouse less attention from socialists and pro-Republicans.

=== The Aryan race and lost lands ===
The Thule Society took its name from Thule, an alleged lost land. Sebottendorff identified Ultima Thule as Iceland. In the Armanism of Guido von List, to which Sebottendorff made distinct references, it was believed that the Aryan race originated on the apocryphal lost continent of Atlantis and took refuge in Thule/Iceland after Atlantis was deluged and sunk under the sea. Hyperborea was also mentioned by Guido von List, with direct references to the theosophic author William Scott-Elliot.

In The Myth of the Twentieth Century, the most important Nazi book after Mein Kampf, Alfred Rosenberg referred to Atlantis as a lost land and an Aryan cultural center. Since Rosenberg had attended meetings of the Thule Society, he might have been familiar with the occult speculation about lost lands; however, according to Lutzhöft (1971), Rosenberg drew on the works of Herman Wirth. The attribution of the Urheimat of the Nordic race to a deluged land was very appealing at that time.

=== Formation of the DAP and the NSDAP ===
In the autumn of 1918, Sebottendorff attempted to extend the appeal of the Thule Society's nationalist ideology to people who had a working-class background. He entrusted the Munich sports reporter Karl Harrer with the task of forming a workers' club, called the Deutscher Arbeiterverein ('German workers' club') or Politischer Arbeiterzirkel ('Political workers' ring'). The most active member of this club was Anton Drexler. Drexler urged the foundation of a political party, and on 5 January 1919 the Deutsche Arbeiterpartei (DAP, German Workers' Party) was formally founded. When Hitler first encountered the DAP on 12 September 1919, Sebottendorff had already left the Thule Society (in June 1919). By the end of February 1920, Hitler had transformed the Deutsche Arbeiterpartei into the Nationalsozialistische Deutsche Arbeiterpartei (NSDAP or National Socialist German Workers’ Party). Apparently, meetings of the Thule Society continued until 1923. A certain Johannes Hering kept a diary of these meetings; it mentions the attendance of other Nazi leaders between 1920 and 1923, but not Hitler.

That the origins of the Nazi Party can be traced to the lodge organisation of the Thule Society is fact. However, there were only two points in which the NSDAP was a successor to the Thule Society. One is the use of the swastika. Friedrich Krohn, who was responsible for the colour scheme of the Nazi flag, had been a member of the Thule Society and also of the Germanenorden since 1913. Goodrick-Clarke concludes that the origins of the Nazi symbol can be traced back through the emblems of the Thule Society and the Germanenorden and ultimately to Guido von List, but it is not evident that the Thulean ideology filtered through the DAP into the NSDAP. Goodrick-Clarke implies that ariosophical ideas were of no consequence: "the DAP line was predominantly one of extreme political and social nationalism, and not based on the Aryan-racist-occult pattern of the Germanenorden [and Thule Society]". Godwin summarises the differences in outlook which separated the Thule Society from the direction taken by the Nazis:

Hitler...had little time for the whole Thule business, once it had carried him where he needed to be...he could see the political worthlessness of paganism [i.e., what Goodrick-Clarke would describe as the racist-occult complex of Ariosophy] in Christian Germany. Neither did the Führer's plans for his Thousand-year Reich have any room whatever for the heady love of individual liberty with which the Thuleans romantically endowed their Nordic ancestors.

The other point in which the NSDAP continued the activities of the Thule Society is in the publication of the newspaper Völkischer Beobachter. Originally, the Beobachter ("Observer") had been a minor weekly newspaper of the eastern suburbs of Munich, published since 1868. After the death of its last publisher in June 1918, the paper ceased publication, until Sebottendorff bought it one month later. He renamed it Münchener Beobachter und Sportsblatt ("Munich Observer and Sports Paper") and wrote "trenchant anti-Semitic" editorials for it. After Sebottendorff left Munich, the paper was converted into a limited liability company. By December 1920, all its shares were in the hands of Anton Drexler, who transferred the ownership of the paper to Hitler in November 1921.

=== Aftermath ===
In January 1933 Sebottendorff published Bevor Hitler kam: Urkundlich aus der Frühzeit der Nationalsozialistischen Bewegung ("Before Hitler Came: Documents from the Early Days of the National Socialist Movement"). Nazi authorities disliked the book, which was banned in the following year. Sebottendorff was arrested but managed to flee to Turkey.

== Heinrich Himmler and the SS ==
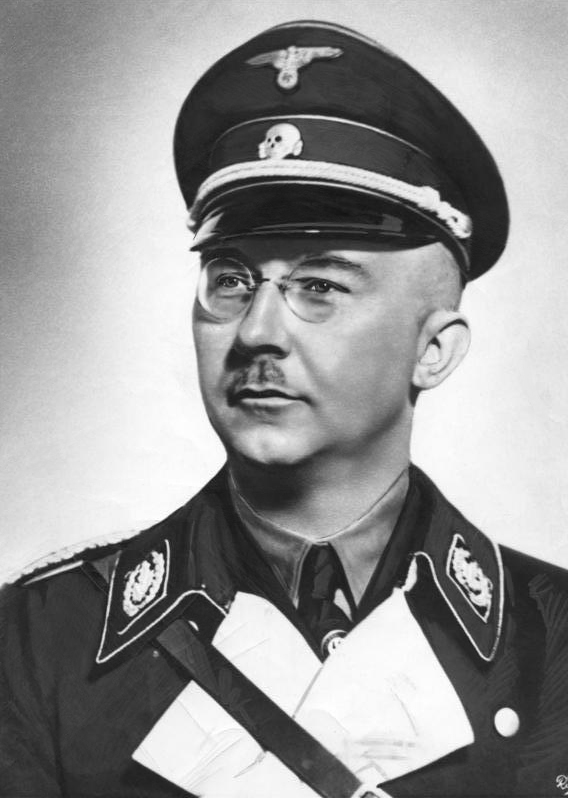
Heinrich Himmler: "We believe in a God Almighty who stands above us; he has created the earth, the Fatherland, and the Volk, and he has sent us the Führer. Any human being who does not believe in God should be considered arrogant, megalomaniacal, and stupid and thus not suited for the SS."

Credited retrospectively with being the founder of "Esoteric Hitlerism", and certainly a figure of major importance for the officially sanctioned research and practice of mysticism by a Nazi elite, was Reichsführer-SS Heinrich Himmler who, more than any other high official in the Third Reich (including Hitler) was fascinated by pan-Aryan (i.e., broader than Germanic) racialism. A staunch anti-Christian, Himmler's capacity for rational planning was accompanied by an "enthusiasm for the utopian, the romantic and even the occult."

It also seems that Himmler had an interest in astrology. He consulted the astrologer Wilhelm Wulff in the last weeks of World War II. (One detailed but difficult source for this is a book written by Wulff himself, Tierkreis und Hakenkreuz, published in Germany in 1968. That Walter Schellenberg had discovered an astrologer called Wulf is mentioned in Hugh Trevor-Roper's The Last Days of Hitler.)

In Bramwell's assessment: "Too much can be made of the importance of bizarre cultism in Himmler's activities...but it did exist, and was one of the reasons behind the split between Himmler and Darré that took place in the late 1930s." Although Himmler did not have any contact with the Thule Society, he possessed more occult tendencies than any other Nazi leader. The German journalist and historian Heinz Höhne, an authority on the SS, explicitly describes Himmler's views about reincarnation as occultism.

The historic example which Himmler used in practice as the model for the SS was the Society of Jesus, since Himmler found in the Jesuits what he perceived to be the core element of any order, the doctrine of obedience and the cult of the organisation. The evidence for this largely rests on a statement from Walter Schellenberg in his memoirs (Cologne, 1956, p. 39), but Hitler is also said to have called Himmler "my Ignatius of Loyola". As an order, the SS needed a coherent doctrine that would set it apart. Himmler attempted to construct such an ideology, and to this purpose he deduced a "pseudo-Germanic tradition" from history. However, this attempt was not entirely successful. Höhne observes that "Himmler's neo-pagan customs remained primarily a paper exercise".

=== Nazi archaeology ===
In 1935 Himmler, along with Darré, established the Ahnenerbe. At first independent, it became the ancestral heritage branch of the SS. Headed by Dr. Hermann Wirth, it was dedicated primarily to archaeological research, but it was also involved in proving the superiority of the 'Aryan race' and in occult practices.

A great deal of time and resources were spent on researching or creating a popularly accepted “historical”, “cultural” and “scientific” background so the ideas about a “superior” Aryan race could be publicly accepted. For example, an expedition to Tibet was organized to search for the origins of the "Aryan race". To this end, the expedition leader, Ernst Schäfer, had his anthropologist Bruno Beger make face masks and skull and nose measurements. Another expedition was sent to the Andes.

Bramwell, however, comments that Himmler "is supposed to have sent a party of SS men to Tibet in order to search for Shangri-La, an expedition which is more likely to have had straightforward espionage as its purpose".

=== Das Schwarze Korps ===
The official newspaper of SS was Das Schwarze Korps ("The Black Corps"), published weekly from 1935 to 1945. In its first issue, the newspaper published an article on the origins of the Nordic race, hypothesizing a location near the North Pole similar to the theory of Hermann Wirth (but not mentioning Atlantis).

Also in 1935, the SS journal commissioned a professor of Germanic history, Heinar Schilling, to prepare a series of articles on ancient Germanic life. As a result, a book containing these articles and entitled Germanisches Leben was published by Koehler & Amelung of Leipzig with the approval of the SS and Reich Government in 1937. Three chapters dealt with the religion of the German people over three periods: nature worship and the cult of the ancestors, the sun religion of the Late Bronze Age, and the cult of the gods.

According to Heinar Schilling, the Germanic peoples of the Late Bronze Age had adopted a four-spoke wheel as symbolic of the sun "and this symbol has been developed into the modern swastika of our own society [i.e., Nazi Germany] which represents the sun." Under the sign of the swastika "the light bringers of the Nordic race overran the lands of the dark inferior races, and it was no coincidence that the most powerful expression of the Nordic world was found in the sign of the swastika". Very little had been preserved of the ancient rites, Professor Schilling continued, but it was a striking fact "that in many German Gaue today on Sonnenwendtage (solstice days) burning sun wheels are rolled from mountain tops down into the valleys below, and almost everywhere the Sonnenwendfeuer (solstice fires) burn on those days." He concluded by saying that "The Sun is the All-Highest to the Children of the Earth".

=== Cultic activities within the SS ===
==== SS-Castle Wewelsburg ====
Himmler has been claimed to have considered himself the spiritual successor or even reincarnation of Heinrich the Fowler, having established special SS rituals for the old king and having returned his bones to the crypt at Quedlinburg Cathedral. Himmler even had his personal quarters at Wewelsburg castle decorated in commemoration of Heinrich the Fowler. The way the SS redesigned the castle referred to certain characters in the Grail-mythos (see The "SS-School House Wewelsburg").

Himmler had visited the Wewelsburg on 3 November 1933 and April 1934; the SS took official possession of it in August 1934. The occultist Karl Maria Wiligut (known in the SS under the pseudonym 'Weisthor') accompanied Himmler on his visits to the castle. Initially, the Wewelsburg was intended to be a museum and officer's college for ideological education within the SS, but it was subsequently placed under the direct control of the office of the Reichsführer SS (Himmler) in February 1935. The impetus for the change of the conception most likely came from Wiligut.

==== SS-Officers in Argentina ====
There are some accounts of SS officers celebrating solstices, apparently attempting to recreate a pagan ritual. In his book El Cuarto Lado del Triangulo (Sudamericana 1995), Professor Ronald Newton describes a number of occasions when a Sonnenwendfeier occurred in Argentina. When SS-Sturmbannführer Baron von Thermann (Edmund Freiherr von Thermann, German WP), the new head of the German Legation, arrived in December 1933, one of his first public engagements was to attend the NSDAP Sonnenwendfeier at the house of Vicente Lopez in the suburbs of Buenos Aires, "a neo-pagan festival with torches in which the Argentine Nazis greeted the winter and summer solstices". At another in December 1937, 500 young people, mostly Hitler Youth and Hitler Maidens, were taken to a natural amphitheatre dominating the sea at Comodoro Rivadavia in the south of the country. "They lit great pillars of wood, and in the light of the flickering flames diverse NSDAP orators lectured the children on the origins of the ceremony and sang the praises of the (Nazis) Fallen for Liberty. In March 1939 the pupils at the German School in Rosario were the celebrants on an island in the Paraná River opposite the city: Hitler Youth flags, trumpets, a rustic altar straight from Germanic mythology, young leaders enthroned with solemnity to the accompaniment of choral singing...the Creole witnesses shook their heads in incredulity..." In the Chaco in the north of Argentina the first great event promoted by the Nazis was the Sonnenwendfeier at Charata on 21 December 1935. Portentous discourses of fire alternated with choral renderings". Such activities continued in Argentina after the war. Uki Goñi in his book The Real Odessa (Granta, 2003) describes how Jacques de Mahieu, a wanted SS war criminal, was "a regular speaker at the pagan solar solstice celebrations held by fugitive Nazis in postwar Argentina."

=== Occultists who worked for the SS ===
==== Karl Maria Wiligut ====
Of all the SS personnel, Karl Maria Wiligut could be best described as a Nazi occultist. The (first?) biography of him, written by Rudolf J. Mund, was titled: Himmler's Rasputin (German: Der Rasputin Himmlers, not translated into English). After his retirement from the Austrian military, Wiligut had been active in the 'ariosophic' milieu. Ariosophy was only one of the threads of Esotericism in Germany and Austria during this time. When he was involuntarily committed to the Salzburg mental asylum between November 1924 and early 1927, he received support from several other occultists. Wiligut was clearly sympathetic to the Nazi Revolution of January 1933. When he was introduced to Himmler by an old friend who had become an SS officer, he got the opportunity to join the SS under the pseudonym 'Weisthor'. He was appointed head of the Department for Pre- and Early history within the Race and Settlement Main Office (Rasse- and Siedlungshauptamt, RuSHA) of the SS. His bureau could (much more than the Ahnenerbe) be described as the occult department of the SS: Wiligut's main duty appears "to have consisted in committing examples of his ancestral memory to paper." Wiligut's work for the SS also included the design of the Totenkopfring (death's head ring) that was worn by SS members. He is even supposed to have designed a chair for Himmler; at least, this chair and its covers are offered for sale on the Internet.

==== Otto Rahn ====
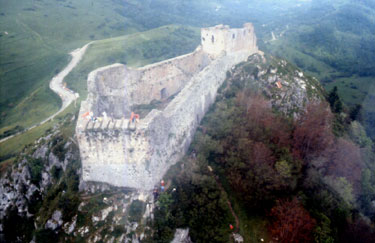
The Fortress of Montségur from the 16th century. The castle that has been linked to the legend of the Holy Grail was destroyed in 1244.

Otto Rahn had written a book Kreuzzug gegen den Gral "Crusade against the Grail" in 1933. In May 1935 he joined the Ahnenerbe; in March 1936 he formally joined the SS. "In September 1935 Rahn wrote excitedly to Weisthor [Karl Maria Wiligut] about the places he was visiting in his hunt for grail traditions in Germany, asking complete confidence in the matter with the exception of Himmler." In 1936 Rahn undertook a journey for the SS to Iceland, and in 1937 he published his travel journal of his quest for the Gnostic-Cathar tradition across Europe in a book titled Luzifers Hofgesinde "Lucifer's Servants". From this book he gave at least one reading, before an "extraordinarily large" audience. An article about this lecture was published in the Westfälische Landeszeitung "Westphalia County Paper", which was an official Nazi newspaper.

Rahn's connection of the Cathars with the Holy Grail ultimately leads to Montségur in France, which had been the last remaining fortress of the Cathars in France during the Middle Ages. According to eyewitnesses, Nazi archaeologists and military officers were present at that castle.

==== Gregor Schwartz-Bostunitsch ====
Gregor Schwartz-Bostunitsch was a radical author with German-Ukrainian ancestry. An active agitator against the Bolshevik Revolution, he fled his native Russia in 1920 and travelled widely in eastern Europe, making contact with Bulgarian Theosophists and probably with G.I. Gurdjieff. As a mystical anti-communist, he developed an unshakeable belief in the Jewish-Masonic world conspiracy portrayed in the Protocols of the Elders of Zion. In 1922 he published his first book, Freemasonry and the Russian Revolution, and emigrated to Germany in the same year. He became an enthusiastic convert to anthroposophy in 1923, but by 1929 he had repudiated it as yet another agent of the conspiracy. Meanwhile, he had begun to give lectures for the Ariosophical Society and was a contributor to Georg Lomer's originally Theosophical (and later, neopagan) periodical entitled Asgard: A Fighting Sheet for the Gods of the Homeland. He also worked for Alfred Rosenberg's news agency during the 1920s before joining the SS. He lectured widely on conspiracy theories and was appointed an honorary SS professor in 1942, but was barred from lecturing in uniform because of his unorthodox views. In 1944 he was promoted to SS-Standartenführer on Himmler's recommendation.

== See also ==
- Nazi archaeology
- Nazi UFOs
- Nazis: The Occult Conspiracy
- The Occult History of the Third Reich
