= Käthe Bierbaumer =

Austrian funder of Adolf Hitler (born 1884)

- Born: 4 July 1884; Ödenburg, Austria-Hungary (now Austria)
- Died: After 1942
- Occupations: Publisher; entrepreneur; sponsor; investor
- Known for: Financial backing of Adolf Hitler

Käthe Bierbaumer, also known as Katharina Bierbaumer (4 July 1884 – after 1942), was a pioneer of Nazism in Germany. She was a publisher, entrepreneur, sponsor of the Thule Society and investor in the Franz-Eher Verlag. Bierbaumer was a financial backer of Adolf Hitler in the early days of the Nazi Party after World War I.

== Early life ==
Käthe Bierbaumer was born on 4 July 1884, in Neustift (today Újteleki) in the Burgenland district of Mattersburg near Ödenburg (today part of Hungary as Sopron). Her family is said to have emigrated to the Ottoman Empire before the First World War. It is unknown under what circumstances she arrived in Germany during or after the war. She seems to have lived in Bad Aibling at the latest from 1918 in the milieu of the Germanenorden and the Thule Society. Later residences were in Bad Sachsa and Freiburg im Breisgau.

== Thule Society ==
Bierbaumer was a member of the Germanic Order and the Thule Society, as well as the main shareholder of the publishing house Franz Eher Nachfahren in Munich. She was the life companion, patron and partner of Rudolf von Sebottendorff (actually Adam Alfred Rudolf Glauer), who had been editor of the Münchener Beobachter (the predecessor newspaper of the NSDAP party organ Völkischer Beobachter) published by Franz Eher since August 1918. On 14 September 1918, her name was entered in the commercial register as the owner of the publishing house Franz Eher Nachfahren with the address Parkstraße 335 in Bad Aibling. On 30 September 1918, the publishing house was renamed "Franz Eher Nachfolger GmbH". Käthe Bierbaumer (now listed as living in Freiburg) and Sebottendorff's sister Dora Kunze were now registered as shareholders.

On 17 December 1920, the NSDAP acquired the paper from its eight owners via the front man Anton Drexler for 120,000 marks, before ownership was then transferred to Adolf Hitler in November 1921. According to other sources, Hitler was entered in the commercial register on 17 December together with Käthe Bierbaumer and Dora Kunze as principal partners. Käthe Bierbaumer is also said to have been one of Hitler's personal financial patrons.

== During the Nazi dictatorship ==
On 13 January 1934, Bierbaumer submitted a petition to Rudolf Hess as a former member of the Thule Society on behalf of Rudolf Freiherr von Sebottendorf, who had been taken into protective custody on the basis of a "denunciation". The petition was forwarded to the Bavarian Political Police, who classified Sebottendorf as a swindler and impostor. The Staff of the Deputy Führer (StdF) did not object Sebottendorf's expulsion.

== Internment on the Isle of Man ==
Bierbaumer was interned for several years as an Enemy alien on the Isle of Man and in the United Kingdom under the registration number 1388. According to records of the Rushen Internment Camp on the Isle of Man, Bierbaumer is said to have entered Great Britain on 16 September 1937. Her last address outside the United Kingdom was the Pension Ville Frey in Bern and she is also known to have left Munich using forged documents with the signature of the commander of the Red Guards. She held the Austrian passport with no. 235, which had been issued in Munich on 14 January 1929.

Her internment was ordered by Metro Police verdict no. 2 of 20 December 1938. On 3 May 1940, the Secretary of State exempted her from internment until further notice. However, she appears to have been interned later, as she was allowed to leave Rushen Camp on 11 November 1940, to attend court in Douglas and the Home Office Advisory Committee. On the same day, it was noted that she was to be interned further. On 4 October 1941, she left the Isle of Man and went to 101 Nightingale Lane, London. She appears to have returned to the Isle of Man, as on 13 October 1943, she is recorded as having left the island again with an escort, now with the aim of "repatriation". After that, traces of her are lost.
