= Nazis: The Occult Conspiracy =

1998 television film

- Genre: Documentary; History
- Written by: Lester Shane
- Directed by: Tracy Atkinson; Joan Baran
- Narrated by: Malcolm McDowell
- Country of origin: United States
- Original language: English

Production
- Running time: 104 minutes

Original release
- Release: 1998

Nazis: The Occult Conspiracy is an American television documentary film about Nazi occultism. It first aired in 1998 on the Discovery Channel. The documentary was directed by Tracy Atkinson and Joan Baran, narrated by Malcolm McDowell.

== Soundtrack ==
The film discusses Wagner's opera Parsifal while the soundtrack plays the "Funeral March" from Götterdämmerung.

== Television and DVD release ==
The documentary was originally shown on television and subsequently released on VHS in the USA on April 6, 1999, by the BMG Distribution and in the UK on 20 Jan 2003 by the Lace International Ltd studio. The running time is 90 minutes.

In Italy the documentary was released on DVD under the title Nazismo: La Cospirazione Occulta in 2003 by Medusa Video.

In Germany the documentary was released on DVD under the title Nazis: Die okkulte Verschwörung on 8 November 2005 by M.I.B. – Medienvertrieb in Buchholz. The documentary was also shown on TV in a shortened version called Hitlers Mystiker.

== See also ==
- Ostara (magazine)

Places

- Externsteine
- Montségur
- Wewelsburg

People

- Savitri Devi
- Karl Ernst Krafft
- Lanz von Liebenfels
- Guido von List
- Nostradamus
- Otto Rahn
- Karl Spiesberger
- Karl Maria Wiligut
- Louis de Wohl
- Wilhelm Wulff
