= Lotusblüten =

Lotusblüthen (1893–1900) and New Lotusblüten (1908-1913 (1914/15)) was a theosophical magazine published by Franz Hartmann. It was the second theosophical magazine in Germany and Austria after Wilhelm Hübbe-Schleidens Die Sphinx.

== Lotusblüthen ==
Lotusblüthen was a monthly journal containing articles and selected translations. The first edition appeared in March 1893 in Leipzig, the last in September 1900, thus there were altogether 96 editions. In each case six editions were bound to one booklet, i.e. editions January to June were combined into a large booklet, which appeared in each case in March, likewise editions July until Decembers with publication date in September. The format corresponded to today's DIN A 5. Franz Hartmann not only functioned as a publisher, but wrote also most of the published articles. The total number of pages of all editions during 1893 to 1900 was approx. 7300 pages, of this 6300 pages were written by Hartmann.

== New Lotusblüten ==
The new Lotusblüten, (this time already written without "h"), was published after 1908. It was now a bimonthly journal, containing original articles and selected translations. The first edition appeared June/July 1908 in Leipzig and Berlin, the last probably in June/July 1913, thus altogether there were 36 (possibly also 42 or 48) editions. It is unsure if the magazine was published in 1914 and 1915. During the secured six years of existence of the magazine until 1913, the total number of pages was approximately 2400 pages. The edition of 1913, was published, because of Hartmann's death on 7 August 1912, by Paul Harald Grävell von Jostenoode (1856–1932).

The new Lotusblüten did not reach the same level of quality as the first Lotusblüthen.

== Literature ==
Numerous essays from the two magazines were published later in book form. So e.g.:

Franz Hartmann as author

- Das Wesen der Alchemie, eine Abhandlung über die Chemie seelischer und geistiger Kräfte im Menschen und im Kosmos. Ullrich, Calw 1994; ISBN 3-928722-31-X
- Die Erkenntnislehre der Bhagavad-gita, im Lichte der Geheimlehre betrachtet. Lang, Kolbenmoor 1999; ISBN 3-930664-06-2
- Die Meister der Weisheit, die indischen und tibetanischen Adepten oder Mahatmas. Schatzkammer-Verlag, Calw 1980
- Die weisse und schwarze Magie oder das Gesetz des Geistes in der Natur. Schatzkammer-Verlag, Calw 1989; ISBN 3-88882-034-0
- Geheimschulen der Magie und okkulte Übungen. Schatzkammer-Verlag, Calw 1980

Franz Hartmann as translator

- Atma Bodha, (Selbsterkenntnis), die geistige Grundlage für die Yogalehre. Schatzkammer-Verlag, Calw 1977; ISBN 3-88882-082-0
- Das Evangelium Buddhas, sein Leben und seine Lehre. Ullrich, Calw 1994; ISBN 3-924411-52-2
- Die Regeln des Radscha Yoga nach den Vorschriften von Gautama Buddha. Schatzkammer-Verlag, Buenos Aires 1957
- Hatha Yoga, die Physiologie des Astralkörpers. Schatzkammer-Verlag, Buenos Aires 1957
- Tattwa Bodha, (Daseinserkenntnis), die wissenschaftliche Grundlage für die Yogalehre. Schatzkammerverlag-Verlag, Calw 1978; ISBN 3-88882-081-2
