= Andrea Meyer =

American novelist

- Education: University of California, Santa Barbara (BA); New York University
- Occupations: Journalist; screenwriter; author
- Spouse: Harlan Bosmajian (m. 2005)
- Website: www.andreameyerwriter.com

Andrea Meyer is an American journalist, screenwriter, and author of the chick lit novel, Room For Love.

== Early life and education ==
Meyer grew up in Los Angeles, California. She went to college at University of California, Santa Barbara (UCSB) and spent her junior year studying at the Sorbonne in Paris. She graduated from UCSB with a BA in English with honors.

== Career ==
Meyer traveled for six months in Europe, eventually getting a job bartending in a wine bar in London. She then moved to Paris, where she spent two years teaching English and doing translations. Meyer returned to the United States in 1993 to get her master's degree in English at New York University. Upon graduation, she had a series of jobs, assisting playwright, composer and theater director Elizabeth Swados and a theater and film literary agent at ICM, and then in film production, on such projects as a French-language feature, Tempéte dans un vers d'eau, the Discovery Channel documentary Nazis: The Occult Conspiracy and the HBO documentary Daughter of Suicide. She also produced and helped program the Avignon/New York Film Festival in 1998, as well as being a juror at numerous film festivals.

After leaving her job at ICM in 1995, Andrea shared a cab home from the airport with the editor-in-chief of Hamptons magazine, who offered her a job writing for the magazine. She wrote her first article about Todd Solondz's film Welcome to the Dollhouse. Andrea subsequently got assignments covering film for such publications as independent film website indieWIRE and eventually became a regular theater critic for The Resident, a New York weekly. Eventually, she became a regular contributor to such publications as Time Out New York and the New York Post. In 2000, Meyer became the managing editor of the IFC's print publication IFC Rant, which was published by indieWIRE. She worked there for two years before leaving to pursue a freelance writing career.

In the spring of 2003, after getting evicted from her apartment and moving into an apartment she bought in the East Village, Andrea wrote a story for the New York Post, in which she pretended to look for a roommate as a ploy to meet men. She decided to adapt the article into a novel (about a New York film journalist named Jacquie Stuart who writes an article for which she pretends to look for a roommate as a ploy to meet men). She began writing the book at the home of her friend and writing partner Kerry Eielson in Southwest France, with whom she was completing a screenplay called The Alpha Girls.

Back in New York, Meyer worked on her novel while covering film, entertainment and social trends for such publications as Time Out New York, Variety, Interview, The Village Voice, the New York Post, the Daily News and Fitness magazine and writing celebrity and women's interest stories for Glamour. A regular job emerged writing movie reviews, interviews and a sex and the movies column called Hot & Bothered for IFC.com; and, from December through February, she reported on the Sundance Film Festival for The Sundance Daily Insider.

Andrea completed the first draft of her novel Room for Love days after she married cinematographer Harlan Bosmajian in 2005. The book was published by St. Martin's Press in 2007.
