= Hellmut Wolff =

German philosopher and mystic

Hellmut Wolff (1906 – 1986) was a German philosopher and mystic.

Wolff was mentioned as a pendulum dowser in the book Reveal the Power of the Pendulum by Karl Spiesberger.

== See also ==
- Pendulum
- Dowsing
- Karl Spiesberger
- Wilhelm Wulff
