= Reichshammerbund =

German anti-Semitic movement

Reich Hammer League Reichshammerbund
- President: Karl August Hellwig
- Founder: Theodor Fritsch
- Founded: 1912
- Dissolved: 1920
- Merged into: Deutschvölkischer Schutz und Trutzbund
- Newspaper: Der Hammer
- Membership (1919): 3,000
- Ideology: Völkisch nationalism German nationalism Antisemitism; Anti-communism
- Political position: Far-right

Reichshammerbund (Reich Hammer League) was a German antisemitic movement founded in 1912 by Theodor Fritsch.

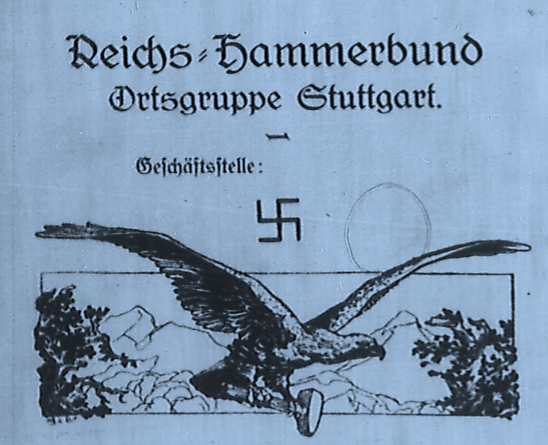
Reichs-Hammerbund graphic using the folkish symbols swastika and Thor's Hammer.

Based on The Hammer, a journal founded by Fritsch in 1902, the Bund argued that Jewish influences had contaminated Germany and attempted to argue that their racism had a basis in biology. The aim of the group was to co-ordinate the activities of the many small antisemitic organisations active at the time and to bring as many of these as possible under its banner. A movement rather than a political party, it sought to be above party politics and to instead encourage a renewal of the German way of life from an anti-capitalist perspective. The battle sign of the group was the swastika, making the Bund one of the first Völkisch movements to use the symbol. The founding document for The Hammer had been Willibald Hentschel's 1901 book Varuna, which preached racial purity and antisemitism.

A sister organisation, the Germanenorden, also appeared in 1912 under Fritsch, although it was a clandestine group for leading members of society who wished to work in secret rather than the Bund which was open. The Bund itself was close to the occultism of the Guido von List Society as amongst its founder members were List Society activists Philipp Stauff, Eberhard von Brockhusen and Karl August Hellwig. It was Hellwig who drafted the group's constitution and who exercised effective control in the early days of the Bund.

They welcomed the outbreak of the First World War as an opportunity to banish softness from Germany and return the country to its harsh, militaristic roots. From 1914 the group took a leading role in gathering anecdotal evidence relating to the involvement of the Jews in the German war effort, much of which later formed the basis of the stab-in-the-back legend.

In 1920 the group, at the instigation of Fritsch's friend Alfred Roth, merged into the Deutschvölkischer Schutz und Trutzbund as part of its continuing policy of forming an umbrella antisemitic movement.
