= Room for Love =

Book by Andrea Meyer

Room for Love is a chick lit novel by American author Andrea Meyer. It was inspired by an article the author wrote for the New York Post.

== Plot ==
The book focuses on 32-year-old Jacquie Stuart, an employee of a New York film magazine who is dissatisfied with various aspects of her life, especially her romantic situation. She pitches an idea for a feature article to the editor of a women's magazine, of answering "Roommate Wanted" advertisements as a way to meet potential partners. The novel follows Jacquie's ensuing experiences with the men she meets in this way.
