= Philipp Stauff =

Philipp Stauff (January 27, 1876–July 17, 1923) was a German/Austrian journalist and publisher in Berlin. He was an enthusiastic Armanist, a close friend of Guido von List, and a founding member of the Guido-von-List-Society. He was also the obituarist for List in the Münchener Beobachter.

Stauff joined the List Society in 1910 and swiftly graduated to the High Armanen Order, the intimate inner circle around List. In 1912 he became a committee member of the List Society and a generous patron. He was the chief German representative of the High Armanen Order at Berlin.

His esoteric treatise Runenhäuser (Rune Houses), published in 1912, "extended the Listian thesis of 'armanist' relics with the claim that the ancient runic wisdom had been enshrined in the geometric configuration of beams in half-timbered houses throughout Germany".

He was active in both the Reichshammerbund and the Germanenorden (pre-World War I völkisch leagues). He was one of the principal officers in the loyalist Berlin province of the original Germanenorden after a splinter group led by Hermann Pohl broke away in 1916.
