= Occult Science in Medicine =

1893 book by Franz Hartmann

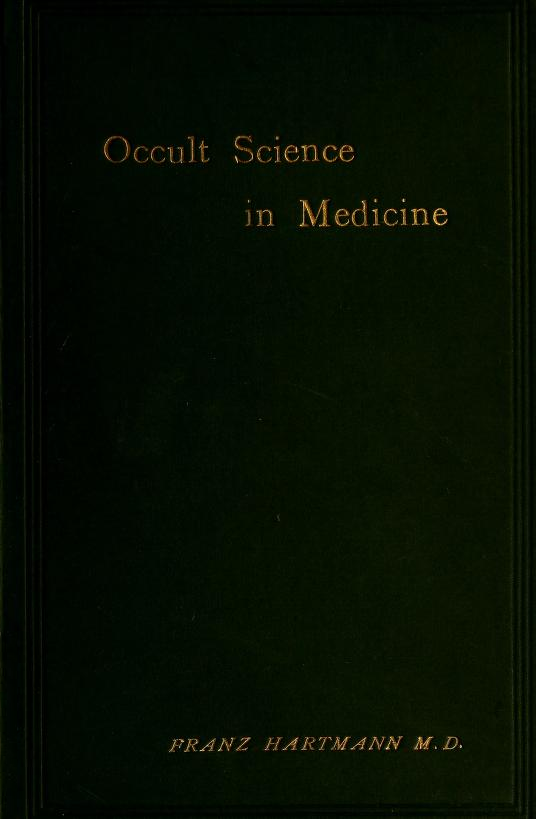
- Author: Franz Hartmann
- Publisher: Theosophical Publishing Society
- Publication date: 1893
- Publication place: United Kingdom

Occult Science in Medicine is a book by the German doctor and theosophist Franz Hartmann, published in 1893. The aim of the book was to raise awareness amongst doctors and medical students about valuable medical knowledge from the past that has been ignored and catalogued as occult.

On a broad level, the book is a comparison between the medical knowledge, practices and system contemporary to the author and those predicated by Theophrastus Paracelsus and supported by Theosophy in general. From a psychological perspective, there is a dualistic representation of the mind and of the body in relation to the constitution of man, diseases and their place in contemporary medicine.

== Content ==
The book consists of five parts, with the most general topic discussed in Part 1 and the most specific points being made in Part 5. Each part is structured as a comparison between contemporary knowledge, science, medicine and their occult counterpart.

=== Part 1: The constitution of man ===
It is highlighted how Ancient medicine was a religious science, recognizing the source of universal life and how popular modern medicine recognizes no real truth because it is concerned only with the lowest plane of existence (i.e. the physical body) by recognizing only the outcome of a blind force. Medicine cannot be separated from religion because the essence of the human being is its divine source (i.e. highest plane of existence) and not the physical body (i.e. lowest plane of existence). This is the recurrent dualistic presentation of the nature of man that is the basis of Hartmann's argument.

Theophrastus Paracelsus is portrayed as the father of medicine and given as example of a physician that recognized the sevenfold constitution of man and used this knowledge to treat his patients.

=== Part 2: The four pillars of medicine ===
The pillars upon which the practice of modern medicine, which is concerned only with the external plane of existence (i.e. the physical world), rests:

- A knowledge of the physical body (i.e. Anatomy, Philology, Pathology)
- Certain amount of acquaintance with physical science;
- Acquaintance with the views and opinions of modern accepted medical authorities (however erroneous they may be);
- A certain amount of judgement and aptitude to put the acquired theories into practice;.

Psychology is portrayed as a misnomer with Hartmann arguing that there can be no science of the soul as long as its existence is not acknowledged.

=== Part 3: The five causes of disease ===
Theophrastus Paracelsus' classification is depicted as a better description of the causes of disease. He classifies diseases as those originating in the kingdom of matter (i.e. physical body), within the realm of the soul (i.e. energy) or in the sphere of the spirit (i.e. intelligence). As long as these three substances are in harmony with each other the individual is healthy; an imbalance will result in disease.

=== Part 4: The five classes of physicians ===
Based on Theophrastus Paracelsus' doctrine, the author makes a distinction between:

- Science of the lower methods (i.e. prescribing drugs, using hot/cold water, applying any other physical forces) can be taught to anybody in possession of an ordinary amount of intelligence.
- Science of the higher methods (i.e. the real art of medicine) requires higher gifts that cannot be acquired in any other way than according to the law of spiritual evolution and higher development of the inner man.

Accordingly, there are lower and higher order physicians. Theophrastus Paracelsus' five classes of physicians are:

- Three lower classes (they seek for resources in the material plane):
  - Naturales – They employ physical remedies acting as opposites—e.g. using cold water for fever (Allopaths – regular practitioners);
  - Specifici – They use physical remedies which experience has shown to work for specific problems ( Empirics, Homeopaths—regular practitioners that have knowledge about how some remedies work in specific situations—the result of observation, and not of knowledge of the fundamental laws of nature);
  - Characterales – They employ the power of the mind—act upon the will and imagination of the patients (Mind healer, Mesmerism)
- Two higher classes (they employ remedies belonging to the super sensual plane):
  - Spirituales – They are in possession of spiritual powers, using the magic power of their own will and thought (Magic, Psychometry, Hypnotism, Spiritism);
  - Fideles – through whom "miraculous" works are performed in the power of the true faith (Adepts).

=== Part 5: The medicine of the future ===
In the final part, the author reflects on the progress of science since the time of Theophrastus Paracelsus and concludes that even though knowledge has been advanced, it does not mean that human kind is wiser. He believes that more spiritual knowledge is needed in order to attain wisdom. Furthermore, in order to attain this spiritual knowledge, the author encourages his readers to get to know their constitution and the nature of the higher power that resides in them.

== Publication ==
It was first published in 1893 by the Theosophical Publishing Society in the United Kingdom. The book was republished in 1993 and in 2010.

== Reception ==
In 1894, Occult Science in Medicine was positively reviewed by the journal Light as an important manuscript that provided access to the system of medicine of Paracelsus in times when materialistic empiricism in medicine seemed to approach its end while the importance of the mind (i.e. thought) was beginning to be recognized again in the cure of disease. Nevertheless, The Physician of the Future chapter was seen as the weakest part of the book because the priest becomes discredited as a physician. Light saw the book as superior to contemporary materialistic medical science.

A commentator in 1946 described it as "a Theosophist's attempt to revive Paracelsian doctrines", in the context of pseudoscientific revivals of astrological thought.
