= Deutsch-Mythologische Landschaftsbilder =

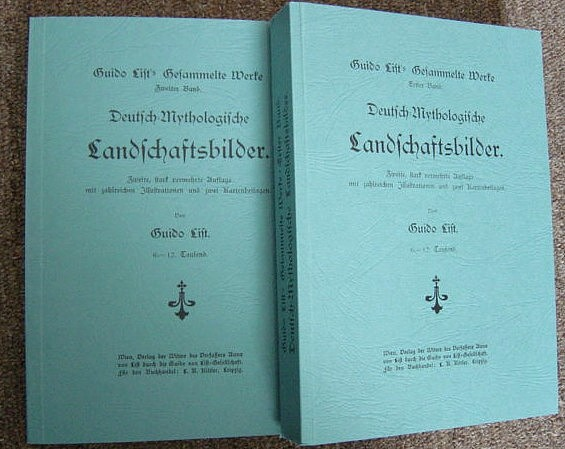
Both 1891 volumes of Deutsch-Mythologische Landschaftsbilder by Guido von List and republished by Adolf Schleipfer

Deutsch-Mythologische Landschaftsbilder is a two-volume book by Guido von List published in 1891. Its English translation is German Mythological Landscape Scenes.

During 1877 and 1887, List had published various journalistic works on his earlier travels and mystical reflections on Loci (local spirits). Many of these pieces were anthologised in 1891 in his famous Deutsch-Mythologische Landschaftsbilder.

Some of the sketches in his sketchbook (which has drawings from as far back as 1863, when he would have been fifteen years old) demonstrate his interest in nature and ancient sites. Some of these sketches were later used to illustrate his Deutsch-Mythologische Landschaftsbilder.
