= Eberhard von Brockhusen =

Eberhard von Brockhusen (1869-1939) was a patron of the List society who lived at Langen in Brandenburg, Germany. Guido von List was travelling to his manor house when he died in the spring of 1919.

He was the Grand Master of the Germanenorden and instrumental in creating its constitution, and served as President of the List Society until he died in March 1939.

In 1936, he is recorded as being chairman of the Brockhusen family association.
