= Münchener Beobachter =

Nazi newspaper

The Münchener Beobachter ("Munich Observer") was a völkisch newspaper edited by Rudolf von Sebottendorf. In the course of 1920 it became the official Nazi organ, becoming the Völkischer Beobachter (People's Observer), and remained the leading Nazi party newspaper until 1945.

On 24 May 1919 Philipp Stauff, a Berlin journalist, good friend of Guido von List and Armanist, wrote an obituary to him which appeared in the Münchener Beobachter called 'Guido von List gestorben', on p. 4.

== History ==
The Münchener Beobachter originated as a local newspaper in Munich in 1887. In 1918, it came under the control of Rudolf von Sebottendorff, who was associated with the Thule Society, a völkisch nationalist group. The newspaper was renamed the Völkischer Beobachter in 1919, and the Nazi Party acquired it in December 1920. It subsequently became an important publication for disseminating Nazi ideology and propaganda.
