= Thule Society =

German occultist and völkisch group in post-World War I Munich

Thule Society Thule-Gesellschaft
- German name: Thule-Gesellschaft
- Abbreviation: Thuleorden
- Leader: Walter Nauhaus
- Founder: Rudolf von Sebottendorf
- Founded: 1918; 108 years ago
- Dissolved: 1925; 101 years ago
- Split from: Germanenorden
- Headquarters: Berlin, Germany
- Newspaper: Münchener Beobachter
- Membership: 1,500 (peak)
- Ideology: Anti-communism; National mysticism; Racial antisemitism
- Political position: Far-right

The Thule Society (/ˈtuːlə/; German: Thule-Gesellschaft), originally the Studiengruppe für germanisches Altertum ('Study Group for Germanic Antiquity'), was a German occultist and Völkisch group founded in Munich shortly after World War I, named after a mythical northern country in Greek legend. The society is notable chiefly as the organization that sponsored the Deutsche Arbeiterpartei (DAP; German Workers' Party), which was later reorganized by Adolf Hitler into the National Socialist German Workers' Party (NSDAP or Nazi Party). According to Hitler biographer Ian Kershaw, the organization's "membership list ... reads like a Who's Who of early Nazi sympathizers and leading figures in Munich", including Rudolf Hess, Alfred Rosenberg, Hans Frank, Julius Lehmann, Gottfried Feder, Dietrich Eckart, and Karl Harrer.

Author Nicholas Goodrick-Clarke contends that Hans Frank and Rudolf Hess had been Thule members, but other leading Nazis had only been invited to speak at Thule meetings, or they were entirely unconnected with it. According to Johannes Hering, "There is no evidence that Hitler ever attended the Thule Society."

== Origins ==
The Thule Society was originally a "German study group" headed by Walter Nauhaus, a wounded World War I veteran turned art student from Berlin who had become a keeper of pedigrees for the Germanenorden (or "Order of Teutons"), a secret society founded in 1911 and formally named in the following year. In 1917, Nauhas moved to Munich; his Thule Society was to be a cover-name for the Munich branch of the Germanenorden, but events developed differently as a result of a schism in the order. In 1918, Nauhas was contacted in Munich by Rudolf von Sebottendorf (or von Sebottendorff), an occultist and newly elected head of the Bavarian province of the schismatic offshoot known as the Germanenorden Walvater of the Holy Grail. The two men became associates in a recruitment campaign, and Sebottendorff adopted Nauhas's Thule Society as a cover-name for his Munich lodge of the Germanenorden Walvater at its formal dedication on 18 August 1918.

== Beliefs ==
A primary focus of the Thule Society was a claim concerning the origins of the Aryan race. In 1917, people who wanted to join the "Germanic Order", out of which the Thule Society developed in 1918, had to sign a special "blood declaration of faith" concerning their lineage:

The signer hereby swears to the best of his knowledge and belief that no Jewish or coloured blood flows in either his or in his wife's veins, and that among their ancestors are no members of the coloured races.

"Thule" (Greek: Θούλη) was a land located by Greco-Roman geographers in the farthest north (often displayed as Iceland). The Latin term "Ultima Thule" is also mentioned by Roman poet Virgil in his pastoral poems called the Georgics. Thule originally was probably the name for Scandinavia, although Virgil simply uses it as a proverbial expression for the edge of the known world, and his mention should not be taken as a substantial reference to Scandinavia. The Thule Society identified Ultima Thule as a lost ancient landmass in the extreme north, near Greenland or Iceland, said by Nazi mystics to be the capital of ancient Hyperborea.

== Activities ==
The Thule Society attracted about 1,500 followers in Bavaria, including 250 followers in Munich.

The followers of the Thule Society were very interested in racial theory and, in particular, in combating Jews and communists. The society opposed the socialist government of the People's State of Bavaria and in December 1918 Sebottendorff planned but failed to kidnap its prime minister Kurt Eisner. After the Communist-led Bavarian Soviet Republic was proclaimed in April 1919, Thulists were accused of trying to infiltrate its government and of attempting a coup. On 26 April, the communists raided the society's premises in Munich and took seven of its members into custody, executing them on 30 April. Amongst them were Walter Nauhaus and three aristocrats, including Countess Heila von Westarp, who functioned as the group's secretary, and Prince Gustav of Thurn and Taxis, who was related to several European royal families. In response, the Thule organised a citizens' uprising as White troops entered the city on 1 May.

=== Münchener Beobachter newspaper ===
In 1918, the Thule Society bought a local weekly newspaper, the Münchener Beobachter (Munich Observer), and changed its name to Münchener Beobachter und Sportblatt (Munich Observer and Sports Paper) in an attempt to improve its circulation. The Münchener Beobachter later became the Völkischer Beobachter ("Völkisch Observer"), the main Nazi newspaper. It was edited by Karl Harrer.

=== German Workers' Party and Nazi Party ===
Anton Drexler had developed links between the Thule Society and various extreme-right workers' organizations in Munich. He established the Deutsche Arbeiterpartei (DAP; German Workers' Party) on 5 January 1919, together with the Thule Society's Karl Harrer. Adolf Hitler joined this party in September of the same year. By the end of February 1920, the DAP had been reconstituted as the Nationalsozialistische Deutsche Arbeiterpartei (NSDAP; National Socialist German Workers' Party), often referred to as the Nazi Party.

Sebottendorff, by then, had left the Thule Society and never joined the DAP or the Nazi Party. Dietrich Bronder (Bevor Hitler kam, 1964) alleged that other members of the Thule Society were later prominent in Nazi Germany: the list includes Dietrich Eckart (who coached Hitler on his public speaking skills, along with Erik Jan Hanussen, and had Mein Kampf dedicated to him), as well as Gottfried Feder, Hans Frank, Hermann Göring, Karl Haushofer, Rudolf Hess, Heinrich Himmler, and Alfred Rosenberg. Historian Nicholas Goodrick-Clarke has described this membership roll and similar claims as "spurious" and "fanciful", noting that Feder, Eckart, and Rosenberg were never more than guests to whom the Thule Society extended hospitality during the Bavarian revolution of 1918, although he has more recently acknowledged that Hess and Frank were members of the society before they came to prominence in the Nazi Party. It has also been claimed that Adolf Hitler himself was a member. Evidence on the contrary shows that he never attended a meeting, as attested to by Johannes Hering's diary of society meetings. It is quite clear that Hitler himself (unlike Himmler, for example) had little interest in, and made little time for, "esoteric" matters.

Wilhelm Laforce and Max Sesselmann (staff on the Münchener Beobachter) were Thule members who later joined the NSDAP.

== Dissolution ==
Early in 1920, Karl Harrer was forced out of the DAP as Hitler moved to sever the party's link with the Thule Society, which subsequently fell into decline and was dissolved about five years later, well before Hitler came to power.

Rudolf von Sebottendorff had withdrawn from the Thule Society in 1919, but he returned to Germany in 1933, hoping to revive it. In that year, he published a book entitled Bevor Hitler kam (Before Hitler Came), in which he claimed that the Thule Society had paved the way for the Führer: "Thulers were the ones to whom Hitler first came, and Thulers were the first to unite themselves with Hitler." The Nazi authorities did not favourably receive this claim: after 1933, esoteric organisations were suppressed (including völkisch occultists), and many were closed down by anti-Masonic legislation in 1935. Sebottendorff's book was prohibited, and he was arrested and imprisoned for a short period in 1934 before departing into exile in Turkey.

Nonetheless, it has been argued that some Thule members and their ideas were incorporated into Nazi Germany. Some of the Thule Society's teachings were expressed in the books of Alfred Rosenberg. Many occult ideas found favour with Heinrich Himmler, who had a great interest in mysticism, unlike Hitler, but the Schutzstaffel (SS) under Himmler emulated the structure of Ignatius Loyola's Jesuit order rather than the Thule Society, according to Hohne.

== Conspiracy theories ==
The Thule Society has become the center of many conspiracy theories concerning Nazi Germany due to its occult background (like the Ahnenerbe section of the SS). Such theories include the creation of vril-powered Nazi UFOs.

== See also ==
- Ahnenerbe
- Guido von List
- Nazi archaeology
- Nazism and occultism
- Thule-Seminar
- Vril Society

== Bibliography ==
- Angebert, Jean-Michel (1974). The Occult and the Third Reich: the mystical origins of Nazism and the search for the Holy Grail. Macmillan. ISBN 0-02-502150-8.
- Goodrick-Clarke, Nicholas (1985). The Occult Roots of Nazism: Secret Aryan Cults and Their Influence on Nazi Ideology - The Ariosophists of Austria and Germany, 1890-1935. London: I.B. Tauris. ISBN 0-8147-3054-X.
- Goodrick-Clarke, Nicholas. 2002. Black Sun: Aryan Cults, Esoteric Nazism and the Politics of Identity. New York University Press. ISBN 0-8147-3124-4. (Paperback 2003, 384 pages, ISBN 0-8147-3155-4.)
- Goodrick-Clarke, Nicholas (2003). Black Sun: Aryan Cults, Esoteric Nazism, and the Politics of Identity. New York: New York University Press. ISBN 978-0-8147-3155-0.
- Höhne, Heinz (1969). The Order of the Death's Head: The Story of Hitler's SS. Martin Secker & Warburg. ISBN 0-14-139012-3.
- Jacob, Frank. 2010. Die Thule-Gesellschaft. Uni-edition. ISBN 3-942171-00-7
- Jacob, Frank: Die Thule-Gesellschaft und die Kokuryûkai: Geheimgesellschaften im global-historischen Vergleich, Königshausen & Neumann, Würzburg, 2012, ISBN 978-3-8260-4909-5
- Phelps, Reginald H. (1963). ""Before Hitler Came": Thule Society and Germanen Orden". The Journal of Modern History. 35 (3): 245–261. doi:10.1086/243738. ISSN 0022-2801. JSTOR 1899474. S2CID 143484937.
