= Ludwig Straniak =

German mystic, architect and astrologer

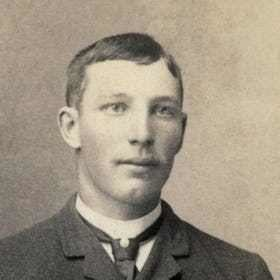

Ludwig Straniak (June 30, 1879 – January 16, 1951), was a German mystic, Germanic revivalist and most notably a pendulum dowser. He was an architect and astrologer and was used by the German military in the Third Reich, not necessarily willingly Straniak was forced to be a Nazi, holding his family hostage.

Two of the more well-known mystics, other than Straniak, used in the Third Reich by Walter Schellenberg through Heinrich Himmler, who had a great deal of interest in Germanic mysticism and revivalism, were Wilhelm Gutberlet, who was a pendulum dowser, and astrologer Wilhelm Wulff.

== Dowsing ==
Straniak claimed to have a special gift for map pendulum dowsing. Straniak would dangle a pendulum over a given map and "locate" things. As a test, leaders of the German Navy requested him to locate the pocket battleship Prinz Eugen, then at sea. The Navy provided him with charts and were reportedly amazed that he had pinpointed the warship even though it was on a completely secret mission off the coast of Norway. Sceptical higher ups, suspecting a hoax ordered further testing. Another experiment was conducted wherein a piece of metal was set down on a piece of paper and then removed, Straniak was then brought into the room and asked to point to where on the paper the metal had been placed. He was reportedly able to consistently identify the correct point. Further testing however proved too much for Straniak, now in his 60s, he began to fail tests before falling ill. Straniak's colleagues also had trouble dealing with constant pressure from their superiors and were eventually dismissed with the institute returning to more conventional scientific pursuits.

According to Karl Spiesberger in his book Reveal the Power of the Pendulum, Straniak believed that brass was the most suitable material for all kinds of dowsing and that even fruits such as apples, oranges, pears and lemons demonstrate a polarity at each end.

== Nazism ==
In September 1939 the Nazi government gathered together psychics, mediums, dowsers, and occultists into an organization to assist the war efforts against the West. They called this unit the Institute for Occult Warfare (IOW) of which Straniak was a member.

== Written works ==
- Die 8. Gross-Kraft der Natur und ihre physikalischen Gesetze 1936, Huber, Diessen

== See also ==
- Nazi occultism
- Pendulum
- Dowsing
- Karl Spiesberger
