= Franz Hartmann =

German occultist, geomancer and astrologer

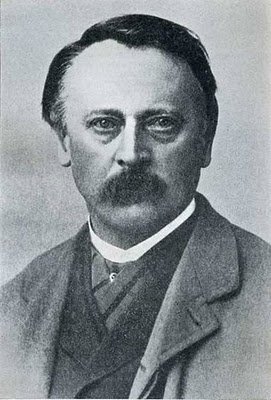
- Born: 22 November 1838; Donauwörth, German Confederation
- Died: 7 August 1912 (aged 73); Kempten im Allgäu, German Empire

Franz Hartmann (22 November 1838 – 7 August 1912) was a German medical doctor, theosophist, occultist, geomancer, astrologer, and author.

== Biography ==
Hartmann was an associate of Helena Blavatsky and was Chairman of the Board of Control of the Theosophical Society Adyar. He collaborated with the mystic Carl Kellner. He published the journals Lotusblüthen (1893-1900) and Neue Lotusblüten (1908-1913). He wrote articles on yoga and popularized the subject within Germany.

He has been described as "one of the most important theosophical writers of his time". His works include several books on esoteric studies and biographies of Jakob Böhme and Paracelsus. He translated the Bhagavad Gita into German and was the editor of the journal Lotusblüten. He was at one time a co-worker of Helena Blavatsky at Adyar. In 1896 he founded a German Theosophical Society. He also joined and supported the völkisch esotericist Guido-von-List-Society (Guido-von-List-Gesellschaft) which was a modern Pagan new religious movement which promoted Wotanism, a proposed revival of the religion of the ancient German race, and which included an inner set of racialist Ariosophical teachings that Guido-Von-List termed Armanism.

According to Theodor Reuss he was one of the original founders of the magical order that would later be known as Ordo Templi Orientis, along with Reuss, Carl Kellner and others.

== Works ==
- Magic: White and Black (London, 1886)
- Life and the Doctrines of Philippus Theophrastus Bombast of Hohenheim Known as Paracelsus (1887)
- Geomancy (London 1889)
- The Talking Image of Urur (New York, 1890)
- The Life and Doctrines of Jacob Boehme (1891)
- Occult Science in Medicine (1893), United Kingdom: Theosophical Publishing Society
- Among the Gnomes: An Occult Tale of Adventure in the Untersburg (1895), London: T. Fisher Unwin
- The Life of Jehoshua, the Prophet of Nazareth
- The Principles of Astrological Geomancy
- Correlation of Spiritual Forces
- With the Adepts: An Adventure Among the Rosicrucians
- In the Pronaos of the Temple of Wisdom Containing the History of the True and the False Rosicrucians
- Alchemy and Astrology
- Metafisica Medicina y Sanacion
- Philosophy and Theosophy
- The Four Pillars of Occult Medicine
- An Adventure Among the Rosicrucians: A Student of Occultism
- Among the Adepts: The Brotherhood of the Golden and Rosy Cross and Their Occult and Mysterious Powers
- To Will, to Dare and to Be Silent in Magic

== See also ==
- Christianity and Theosophy
- Theosophists as fiction writers
- Buried Alive (1895)
