= Wilhelm Hübbe-Schleiden =

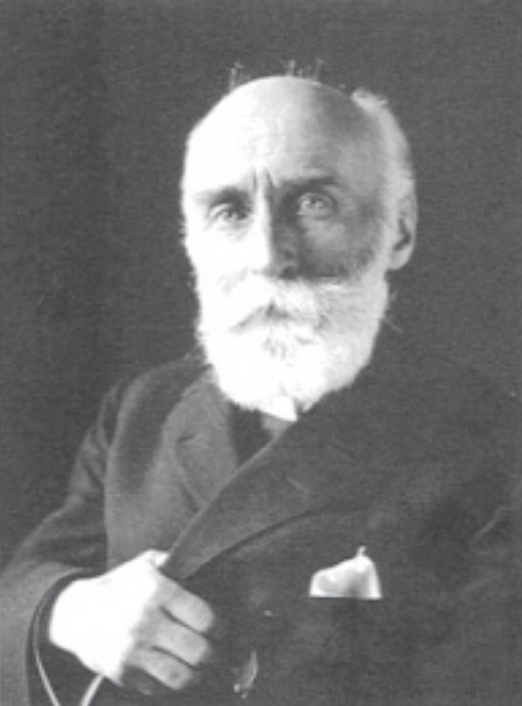

Wilhelm Hübbe-Schleiden (20 October 1846 – 17 May 1916) was a German law scholar, theosophist, colonialist and writer. He established the first German society of theosophists.

== Life and work ==
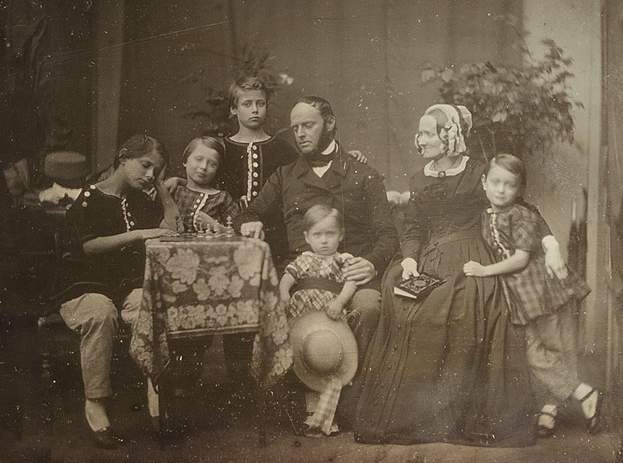
Hübbe on his father's lap with mother and siblings in 1849

Hübbe was born in Hamburg to state official Wilhelm Hübbe and Wilhelmine Maria Sophie Eleonore Schleiden. He studied at the Universities of Göttingen, Heidelberg, Munich and Leipzig receiving a degree of juris utriusque doctor in 1869. He took on the surname Hübbe-Schleiden. In 1870-71 he worked at the German consulate in London. He then worked in Gabon, West Africa as a consular attaché (1875-77) and was involved in German colonial policy in the region. He also set up a business Bolton & Schleiden along with Augustus S. Bolton. He was charged with murder in Gabon when he and a policeman assailed a main who was trying to rob a store. He was able to appeal and return to Germany.

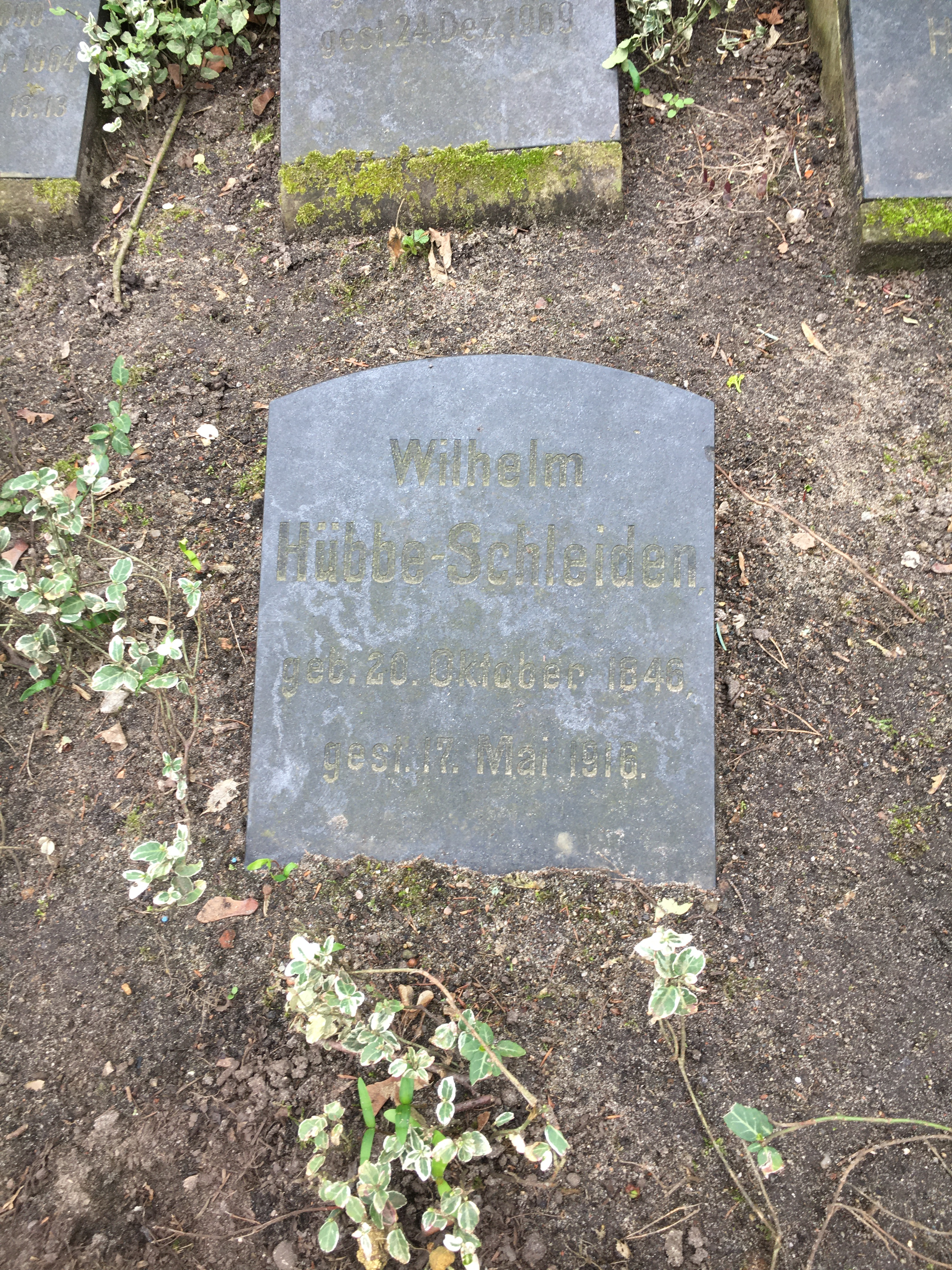
Grave in Hamburg

In 1884 he was influenced by Alfred P. Sinnett's Esoteric Buddhism, and he came to learn about the theosophical movement from the Gebhard family of industrialists in Elberfeld where he lived. He became a member of the Theosophical Society with its headquarters in India. He became a founding president of the first German unit of the Theosophical Society in 1884 but this organization was dissolved in 1886 following the allegations made against Helena Blavatsky. He edited and published the periodical Sphinx. Monatsschrift für Seelen- und Geistesleben (Sphinx: Monthly for Soul and Intellectual Life) between 1886 and 1896. In 1897-98 he visited India, experimenting with ganja to induce "god-intoxication", and on returning, he wrote Indien und die Indier (1898). In 1892 he created a new Theosophical Union in Berlin. In 1894, Colonel H. S. Olcott visited the German Theosophical Society. In 1912, he became interested in Rosicrucianism and applied to join the Order. Meanwhile, another organization was created in 1896 in Berlin called the Theosophical Society of Europe. In 1897, there was another splinter group under Franz Hartmann in Munich. The secretary general Rudolf Steiner then created the Anthroposophical Society, and a few theosophists moved there while Hübbe-Schleiden and some 320 members stayed on under the leadership of Annie Besant. With the outbreak of World War I, the theosophical movement lost steam, and Hübbe-Schleiden's death in Göttingen in 1916 marked its end.

He wrote several books, including:

- Ethiopien: Studien uber Westafrika (1879)
- Uberseeische Politik (2 parts; 1881–83)
- Deutsche Kolonisation (1881)
- Kolonisationpolitik und Kolonisationtechnik (1882)
