= Germanenorden =

Occultist secret society in early 20th-century Germany

The Germanenorden (Germanic or Teutonic Order) was an occultist and völkisch secret society in early 20th-century Germany.

== History ==
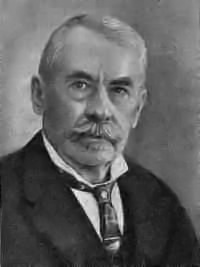
Theodor Fritsch around 1920

The Germanenorden was founded in Berlin in 1912 by Theodor Fritsch and several prominent German occultists including Philipp Stauff, who held office in the Guido von List Society and High Armanen Order as well as Hermann Pohl, who became the Germanenorden's first leader. The order was a clandestine movement that wished to create a small but devoted group and was a sister movement to the more open and mainstream Reichshammerbund.

In 1916, during World War I, the Germanenorden split into two parts. Eberhard von Brockhusen became the Grand Master of the "loyalist" Germanenorden. Pohl, previously the order's Chancellor, founded a schismatic offshoot: the Germanenorden Walvater of the Holy Grail. He was joined in the same year by Rudolf von Sebottendorff (formerly Rudolf Glauer), a wealthy adventurer with wide-ranging occult and mystical interests. A Freemason and a practitioner of Sufism and astrology, Sebottendorff was also an admirer of Guido von List and Lanz von Liebenfels. Convinced that the Islamic and Germanic mystical systems shared a common Aryan root, he was attracted by Pohl’s runic lore and became the Master of the Walvater's Bavarian province late in 1917. Charged with reviving the province's fortunes, Sebottendorff increased membership from about a hundred in 1917 to 1,500 by the autumn of the following year.

The Munich lodge of the Germanenorden Walvater when it was formally dedicated on August 18, 1918, was given the cover name the Thule Society, which is notable chiefly as the organization that sponsored the Deutsche Arbeiterpartei (DAP), which was later transformed by Adolf Hitler into the National Socialist German Workers' Party (NSDAP).

== Activity ==
The Germanenorden had a hierarchical fraternal structure based on Freemasonry. The structure was adopted due to the assumption that Jews engaged in secret organizing, and that it would be best to counter their influence over the German public life by using the same method. The primary concern was to monitor Jewish activity and to be a centre for the distribution of antisemitic material. Secondary concerns involved the assistance between members in business and the circulation of völkisch journals, especially Fritsch's journal Hammer.

Applicants were required to prove their Germanic descent, and if they were married also their wife's Germanic descent. Through Bernhard Koerner, Stauff and Brockhusen, the order became imbued with the occult-nationalist ideas of List. Influenced by List's Ariosophy, it adopted a swastika superimposed on a cross as its symbol in 1916. The rituals of the order were influenced by theories about the Aryan race, Freemasonry and the operas of Richard Wagner.

== See also ==
- Secret society
