= Karl Spiesberger =

German occult writer

Karl Spiesberger (29 October 1904 – 1 January 1992) was a German mystic, occultist, Germanic revivalist and Runosophist. He is best known for his revivalism and usage of the sidereal pendulum for divination and dowsing and for his anti-racialist stance and revivalist usage of the Armanen Futharkh runic system after the second world war, removing its negative connotations. During his involvement with the Fraternitas Saturni Spiesberger was also known as Frater Eratus. Under this name he published several articles in the Blätter für angewandte okkulte Lebenskunst.

== Life ==
Spiesberger's father worked as a gardener. Since his earliest youth Spiesberger was interested in occultism and hypnosis. In May 1932 he moved to Berlin to train for a career as an actor. In 1935 he met the then already well-known magician and occultist Gregor A. Gregorius, (who in 1928 founded the Lodge "Fraternitas Saturni") and came into close contact with him. Later he became one of its best-known members.

He worked intensively with the magical use of the Armanen Futharkh runes. When this came in conflict with the Nazi regime, he turned to other occult themes, such as the magic of the spheres and the ancient books of magic (grimoires).

After the upheavals and repressions of the second world war, Spiesberger headed an esoteric study circle, where he met his future wife, Christa. As a member of the lodge founded by Gregorius, Fraternitas Saturni, he was made a Brother under his lodge name "Eratus" in 1948 in Riesa.

Under high usage (hohem Einsatz), he wrote the lodge newspaper "Leaves for applied occult art of living" ("Blätter für angewandte okkulte Lebenskunst"), as well as 42 books as a special titled "Inauguration" ("Einweihung").

When Gregorius reorganised the FS after the war in 1950 Spiesberger became a prominent teacher in the Berlin Lodge (Orient Berlin) of the FS. In the same time, he devoted himself to writing.

Gregory gave Eratus [words seem to be missing here] on 18 March 1957 which made eternal faithfulness unto gradus solos (master level), at the initiation of the lodge and the demiurge Saturn.

In 1960 he withdrew from the lodge for unknown reasons. During the early 1960s discord and envy in the Fraternitas Saturni ruled; however, Spiesberger continued his researches undaunted.

Due to his knowledge and diligence, he expected to assume leadership of the lodge after the demise of Gregorius'; the married Gardner, however, put forward his long-term lover, Sorella Roxane for the Office of the Grand Master. Due to divergent views on spiritual issues Spiesberger left the lodge, but continued to devote his time to lectures and his literary activities.

In the 1980s, the animal lover reworked some of his works, which were reissued in new editions.

He died in the age of 87 in Berlin and is also buried there.

== Rune Magic ==
Spiesberger is well known as the single most important person to revive Germanic mysticism after the second world war, including the Armanen runes and the pendulum.

Due to the Nazi suppression and imprisonment of "non-authorised" or "non-officially sanctioned" runic/Germanic mystics and revivalists and their respective organisations during the Third Reich (see occultism in Nazism), the runes were so closely associated with the Nazis that the use and discussion of them in academic as well as esoteric circles was hampered by adverse public opinion. Those of the old runic magicians and occultists who had survived the war in Germany, slowly began to make their way back to their work, and new voices were also heard. The best known of these new voices was Spiesberger.

After the war the Armanen system was revived, and "reformed" by Spiesberger. Spiesberger was a widely qualified, "eclectic" occultist who has authored books in the hermetic as well as the runic tradition. His two principle works on runic topics are Runenmagie: Handbuch der Runenkunde (1955) and Runenexerzitien für Jedermann (1958). In these books he synthesises the work of all the German runic magicians and experts who preceded him, within a pansophical framework. Although he eliminates all the racist and völkisch elements, he retains the Armanen system of runes, which by 1955 had become almost traditional in German circles.

== Work ==
Spiesberger's works were always cast in the 18 rune Futharkh (the Armanen Runes) as originally envisioned by Guido von List and magically developed by Siegfried Adolf Kummer. Both were proponents of the Armanen Runes. What Spiesberger essentially tried to do was remove the "racist" aspects of the Armanic and Marbyan rune work and place the whole system in a pansophical, or eclectic, context. To Guido von List, Friedrich Bernhard Marby, Siegfried Adolf Kummer and Rudolf John Gorsleben, the runes represent the key to esoteric understanding. To Spiesberger, they were just one more tool to be used by any individual magician.

After the war he also wrote Der erfolgreiche Pendel-Praktiker published in 1963. Although still far more readily available in its original German text, it is now also available in its 1989 English translation entitled Reveal the Power of the Pendulum. In this book about pendulum dowsing, he refers to the Odic force.

Like most authors on esoteric or magical subjects, he presents a mixture of the old with some original innovations of his own. To some extent the innovations may have been drawn from the eclectic teachings of the Fraternitas Saturni.

== Selected works ==
Karl Spiesberger has written many works.

- Sinnen und Forschen, 1950
- Der Traum in tiefenpsychologischer und okkulter Bedeutung, 1950
- Das Problem der Tierseele, 1950
- Auf den Spuren der Seherin (mit Erich Sopp,), 1953
- Die Kunst, Karten zu legen, 1954
- Runenmagie, 1955
- Der erfolgreiche Pendelpraktiker, 1955
- Runenexerzitien für Jedermann, 1958
- Unsichtbare Helferkräfte, 1959/1960
- Elementargeister - Naturgeister, 1961
- Reveal the Power of the Pendulum: Secrets of the Sidereal Pendulum, A Complete Survey of Pendulum Dowsing, 1962. ISBN 0-572-01419-8. Originally published as Der erfolgreiche Pendelpraktiker in 1955.
- Die Aura des Menschen, 1963
- Hermetisches ABC Bd.1, Esoterische Lebensformung in Theorie und Praxis, 1964
- Hermetisches ABC Bd.2, Magisch-mystische Schulung in Theorie und Praxis, 1964
- Praktische Telepathie, 1966
- Runenmagie Handbuch der Runenkunde, 1968 (R. Schikowski-Verlag, Berlin)
- Magneten des Glücks, 1971
- Das Mantra Buch, 1977
- Naturgeister Wie Seher sie sehen, wie Magier sie rufen | Erweiterte 2.Auflage "Elemtargeister - Naturgeister, 1978
- Telepathie Die Macht des Überbewußten, 1982. ISBN 3-87702-071-2
- Die Masken des Traumes, 1986
- Phänomen Tier, 1986
- Die Aura Des Menschen: Wie die Aura sichtbar gemacht werden kann und was ihre Farben bedeuten, 1987
- Levitation, 1988
- Auf dunklem Pfad zum Licht, 1989
- Secrets of the New Age: 4 Complete Books, 1989
- Magische Novellen, (posthum 1999 durch die Witwe veröffentlicht)

== See also ==
- Ludwig Straniak
