= Zodiac and Swastika =

1968 book by Wilhelm Wulff

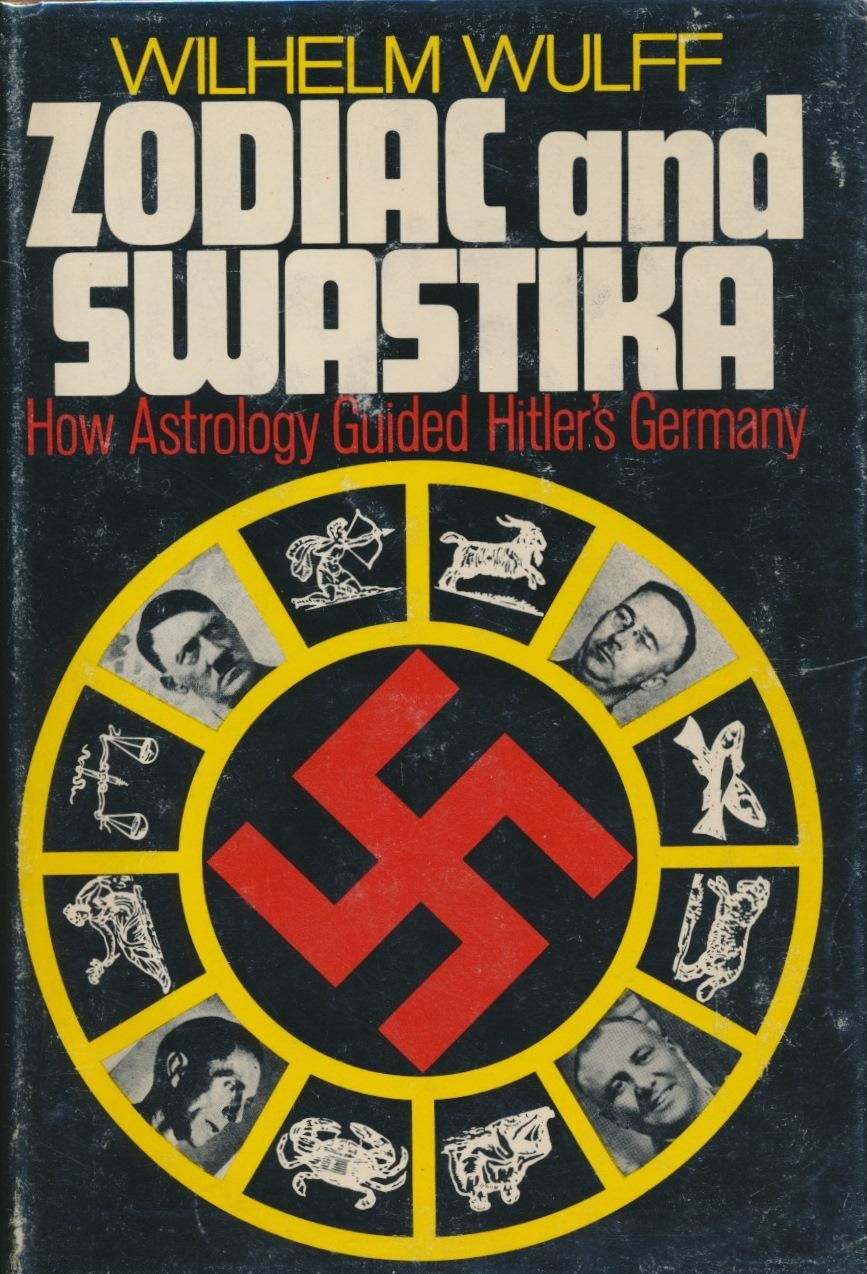
- Cover of the first American edition
- Author: Wilhelm Wulff
- Original title: Tierkreis und Hakenkreuz: Als Astrologe an Himmlers Hof
- Language: German
- Subject: Occultism in Nazism
- Published: 1968 (Bertelsmann Sachbuchverlag, in German); 1973 (Coward, McCann & Geoghegan, in English)
- Publication place: Germany
- Media type: Print (hardcover)
- Pages: 248
- ISBN: 0-698-10547-8 first American edition
- OCLC: 5814065
- Dewey Decimal: 940.5343
- LC Class: BF1728.H6 W8

Zodiac and Swastika: How Astrology Guided Hitler's Germany (German: Tierkreis und Hakenkreuz: Als Astrologe an Himmlers Hof) is a 1968 book by Wilhelm Wulff. It was first published by Bertelsmann Sachbuchverlag in German in 1968, and was translated into English in 1973, published in the United States by Coward, McCann & Geoghegan and in the United Kingdom by Arthur Barker Limited of London. The English edition has a foreword by the historian Walter Laqueur. The book covers Wulff's claims of occultist influence on the Nazi regime.

== Background and publication history ==
The author Wilhelm Theodor H. Wulff (27 March 1892 – 9 June 1979) was a German-Austrian astrologer. The book was first published by Bertelsmann Sachbuchverlag in German in 1968, under the title Tierkreis und Hakenkreuz: Als Astrologe an Himmlers Hof.

It was translated into English and released in 1973 in the United States by Coward, McCann & Geoghegan and in the United Kingdom by Arthur Barker Limited of London, under the title Zodiac and Swastika: How Astrology Guided Hitler's Germany. The English edition has a foreword by the historian Walter Laqueur. This edition is 192 pages long.

== Contents ==
The book covers Wulff's claims of occultist influence on the Nazi regime, and his own involvement. The historian Nicholas Goodrick-Clarke takes the book as evidence that Wulff was consulted by Heinrich Himmler in the last weeks of the war. Wulff claims that Arthur Nebe and Walter Schellenberg had assigned him various astrological tasks. He also mentions that they had used pendulum dowsers like Ludwig Straniak for similar purposes.

He concludes the book by arguing that "National Socialism was smashed and disappeared from the scene. Astrology [...] remained".

== Reception ==
A review by Otto Friedrich in Time magazine called it the "autobiography of a septuagenarian astrologer who occasionally was summoned to deliver prophecies". Friedrich argued it was not a "serious study", contrary to what its title implied, was generally absurd, and contained some sentences he found ridiculous, for example:

Not long afterward the Nazis were to take over completely. These circumstances had a profound effect on my astrological practice.

Kirkus Reviews said it had a "certain macabre interest", and was, at least, more credible than the writings of Trevor Ravenscroft.
