= Guido von List =

Austrian occultist and writer (1848–1919)

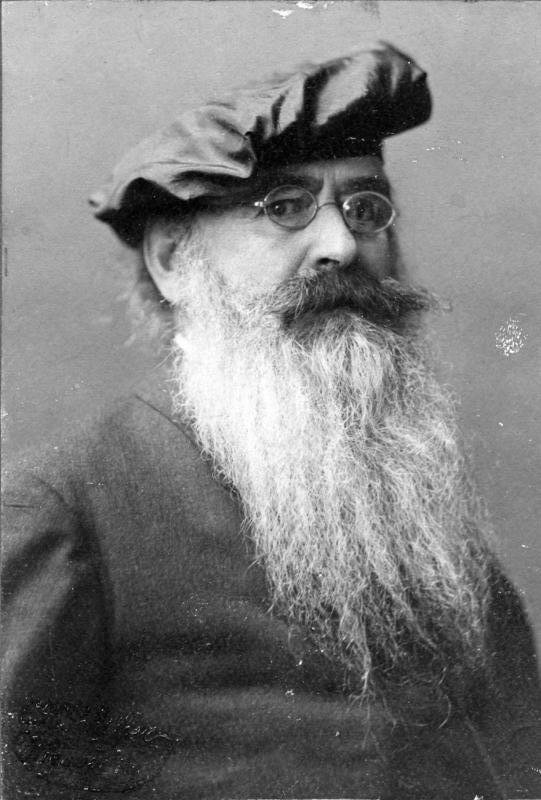
- von List in 1913
- Born: Guido Karl Anton List; 5 October 1848; Vienna, Austrian Empire
- Died: 17 May 1919 (aged 70); Berlin, German Reich
- Occupations: Occultist; novelist

Guido Karl Anton List (5 October 1848 – 17 May 1919), better known as Guido von List, was an Austrian occultist, journalist, playwright, and novelist. He expounded a modern Pagan new religious movement known as Wotanism, which he claimed was the revival of the religion of the ancient German race, and which included an inner set of Ariosophical teachings that he termed Armanism.

Born to a wealthy middle-class family in Vienna, List claimed that he abandoned his family's Roman Catholic faith in childhood, instead devoting himself to the pre-Christian god Wotan. Spending much time in the Austrian countryside, he engaged in rowing, hiking, and sketching the landscape. From 1877 he began a career as a journalist, primarily authoring articles on the Austrian countryside for nationalist newspapers and magazines. In these he placed a völkisch emphasis on the folk culture and customs of rural people, believing that many of them were survivals of pre-Christian, pagan religion. He published three novels, Carnuntum (1888), Jung Diethers Heimkehr (1894), and Pipara (1895), each set among the German tribes of the Iron Age, as well as authoring several plays. During the 1890s he continued writing völkisch articles, now largely for the nationalist Ostdeutsche Rundschau newspaper, with his works taking on an antisemitic dimension halfway through that decade. In 1893, he co-founded the Literarische Donaugesellschaft literary society, and involved himself in Austria's Pan-German nationalist movement, a milieu which sought the integration of Austria into the German Empire.

During an 11-month period of blindness in 1902, List became increasingly interested in occultism, in particular coming under the influence of the Theosophical Society, resulting in an expansion of his Wotanic beliefs to incorporate Runology and the Armanen Futharkh. The popularity of his work among the völkisch and nationalist communities resulted in the establishment of a List Society in 1908; attracting significant middle and upper-class support, the Society published List's writings and included an Ariosophist inner group, the High Armanen Order, over whom List presided as Grand Master. Through these ventures he promoted the millenarian view that modern society was degenerate, but that it would be cleansed through an apocalyptic event resulting in the establishment of a new Pan-German Empire that would embrace Wotanism. After having erroneously prophesied that this empire would be established by victory for the Central Powers in World War I, List died on a visit to Berlin in 1919.

During his lifetime, List became a well-known figure among the nationalist and völkisch subcultures of Austria and Germany, influencing the work of many others operating in this milieu. His work, propagated through the List Society, influenced later völkisch groups such as the Reichshammerbund and Germanenorden, and through those exerted an influence on both the burgeoning Nazi Party, the SS and the German Faith Movement. After World War II his work continued to influence an array of Ariosophic and Heathen practitioners in Europe, Australia, and North America.

== Biography ==
=== Early life: 1848–1877 ===
Guido Karl Anton List was born on 5 October 1848 in Vienna, then part of the Austrian Empire. Born to a prosperous middle-class family, he was the eldest son of Karl Anton List, a leather goods dealer who was the son of Karl List, a publican and vintner. Guido's mother, Marian List, was the daughter of builder's merchant Franz Anton Killian. List was raised in the city's second bezirk, on the eastern side of the Danube canal. Like most Austrians at the time, his family were members of the Roman Catholic denomination of Christianity, with List being christened into this faith at St Peter's Church in Vienna. Reflecting the family's wealth and bourgeoisie status, in 1851 a watercolour portrait of List was painted by the artist Anton von Anreiter.

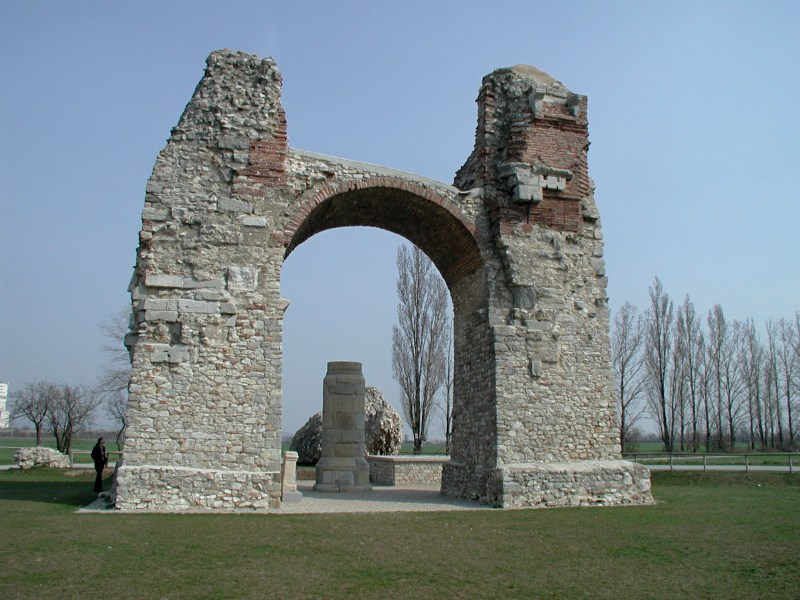
Heidentor, the Pagan Gate at Carnuntum where List buried wine bottles in 1875

Accounts suggest that List had a happy childhood. Developing a preference for rural areas rather than urban ones, he enjoyed family visits to the countryside of Lower Austria and Moravia, and – encouraged by his father – he began to sketch and paint the castles, prehistoric monuments, and natural scenery of these areas. According to his later account, he developed an early interest in the pre-Christian religions of Austria, coming to believe that the catacombs beneath St. Stephen's Cathedral in Vienna had once been a shrine devoted to a pagan deity. He claimed that on an 1862 visit to the catacombs with his father, he knelt before a ruined altar and swore that when he was an adult he would construct a temple to the ancient god Wotan.

Although List wanted to become an artist and scholar, he reluctantly agreed to his father's insistence that he enter the family's leather goods business. During his leisure time he devoted himself to writing and sketching as well as rambling, riding, or rowing in the countryside, becoming both a member of the Viennese rowing club Donauhort and the secretary of the Austrian Alpine Association (Österreichischer Alpenverein). He was involved in both solitary and group expeditions into the Austrian Alps, and it was on one of the latter journeys that he left his mountaineering group to spend Midsummer night alone atop the Geiselberg hillfort. On 24 June 1875 he and four friends rowed down the Danube before camping for the night at the site of the ancient Roman fortification of Carnuntum to commemorate the 1500th anniversary of the Battle of Carnuntum, in which Germanic tribes defeated the Roman Army. List later claimed that while his friends caroused, he celebrated the event with a fire and by burying eight bottles of wine in the shape of a swastika beneath the arch of the monument's Pagan Gate.

=== Early literary endeavours: 1877–1902 ===
A photograph of List in 1878

In 1877, List's father died. List soon abandoned the leather goods business that he inherited, intent on devoting himself to literary endeavours as a journalist, even if this meant a significant reduction in his income. On 26 September 1878 he married his first wife, Helene Förster-Peters. From 1877 to 1887 he wrote for the nationalist magazines Neue Welt ("New World"), Heimat ("Homeland"), Deutsche Zeitung ("German Newspaper"), and the Neue Deutsche Alpenzeitung ("New German Alpine Newspaper"), with his articles being devoted to the Austrian countryside and the folk customs of its inhabitants. His interpretations emphasised what he believed were the pagan origins of Austrian place-names, customs, and legends, describing the landscape as being embodied by genius loci, and expressing clear German nationalist and völkisch sentiment.

In 1888, he published his first novel, Carnuntum, in two volumes. Set in the late fourth century CE, the narrative focused on a romance set against the background of the conflict between Germanic tribes and the Roman Empire around the area of the eponymous Roman fort. The novel established List as a recognised figure within Austria's Pan-German community, a movement of individuals unified in their belief that the majority German-speaking areas of the multi-linguistic and multi-ethnic Austro-Hungarian state should cede and join with the newly established German Empire. The book also brought him to the attention of Friedrich Wannieck, a wealthy industrialist who was the chairman of both the Prague Iron Company and the First Brno Engineering Company. Wannieck was also president of the Verein 'Deutsches Haus' ("'German House' Association"), a nationalist organisation of linguistically German inhabitants of Brno who felt encircled by the largely Czech population of South Moravia. List and Wannieck began corresponding, resulting in a lifelong friendship between the two men. The Verein 'Deutsches Haus' subsequently published three of List's works in its series on German nationalist studies of history and literature.

List began regularly writing for a weekly newspaper, the Ostdeutsche Rundschau ("East German Review"), which had been established in 1890 by the Austrian Pan-German parliamentary deputy Karl Wolf. In 1891, List anthologised many of the magazine articles that he had written over the previous decades in his book Deutsch-Mythologische Landschaftsbilder ("German Mythological Landscape Scenes"), extracts of which were then published in the Ostdeutsche Rundschau. Further völkisch articles on various topics pertaining to Austria's folk culture and to its ancient Germanic tribes followed during the 1890s, although midway through that decade his work took on an explicitly antisemitic nature with articles such as "Die Juden als Staat und Nation" ("The Jews as a State and Nation"). Other Austrian German nationalist newspapers which published his articles during this period included the Bote aus dem Waldviertel ("The Waldviertel Herald") and Kyffhäuser.

A scenic view of Höllental from List's Deutsch-Mythologische Landschaftsbilder

List began lecturing on these subjects; for instance, in February 1893 he spoke to the nationalist Verein 'Deutsches Geschichte' ("'German History' Association) on the ancient priesthood of Wotan. He also worked as a playwright, and in December 1894 his play Der Wala Erweckung ("The Wala's Awakening") was premiered at an event organised by the Bund der Germanen (Germanic League) which was devoted to the German nationalist cause, with Jews being explicitly banned from attending the event. Alongside his affiliation with the Bund, List was also a member of the Deutscher Turnverein (Germanic Gymnastic League), a strongly nationalistic group to whom he contributed literary works for their events.

In 1893, List and Fanny Wschiansky founded a belletristic society devoted to encouraging German nationalist and neo-romantic literature in Vienna, the Literarische Donaugesellschaft ("Danubian Literary Society"). The group was partly based upon the 15th-century Litteraria Sodalita Danubiana created by the Viennese humanist Conrad Celtes, about whom List authored a brief biography in 1893. He also authored two further novels during the 1890s, both of which were historical romances set in Iron Age Germany. The first appeared in 1894 as Jung Diethers Heimkehr ("Young Diether's Homecoming"), which told the story of a young Teuton living in the fifth century who has been forcefully converted to Christianity but who returns to his original solar cult. The second was Pipara, a two-volume story published in 1895 which told the story of an eponymous Quadi maiden who escaped captivity from the Romans to become an empress. In 1898, he then authored a catechism exhibiting a form of pagan deism titled Der Unbesiegbare ("The Invincible").

List's activities had made him a celebrity within the Austrian Pan-German movement, with the editors of the Ostdeutsche Rundschau convening a Guido List evening in April 1895 and South Vienna's Wieden Singers' Club holding a List festival in April 1897. Having divorced his previous wife, in August 1899 List married Anna Wittek, who was from Stecky in Bohemia. Despite List's modern Pagan faith, the wedding was held in an evangelical Protestant church, reflecting the growing popularity of Protestantism among Austria's Pan-German community, who perceived it as a more authentically German form of Christianity than the Catholicism that was popular among Austria-Hungary's other ethnic and linguistic communities. Wittek had previously appeared in a performance of List's Der Wala Erweckung and had publicly recited some of his poetry. Following their marriage, List devoted himself fully to drama, authoring the plays König Vannius ("King Vannius") in 1899, Sommer-Sonnwend-Feuerzauber ("Summer Solstice Fire Magic") in 1901 and Das Goldstück ("The Gold Coin") in 1903. He also authored a pamphlet titled Der Wiederaufbau von Carnuntum ("The Reconstruction of Carnuntum") in 1900, in which he called for the reconstruction of the ancient Roman amphitheatre at Carnuntum as an open-air stage through which Wotanism could be promoted.

=== Later life: 1902–1919 ===
"List ... belonged to an older generation than most of his pre-war fellow ideologues and thus became a cult figure on the eastern edge of the German world. He was regarded by his readers and followers as a bearded old patriarch and a mystical nationalist guru whose clairvoyant gaze had lifted the glorious Aryan and Germanic past of Austria into full view from beneath the debris of foreign influences and Christian culture. In his books and lectures List invited true Germans to behold the clearly discernible remains of a wonderful theocratic Ario-German state, wisely governed by priest-kings and gnostic initiates, in the archaeology, folklore, and landscape of his homeland."

— Historian of esotericism Nicholas Goodrick-Clarke.

According to the historian Nicholas Goodrick-Clarke, 1902 marked "a fundamental change in the character of [List's] ideas: occult ideas now entered his fantasy of the ancient Germanic faith." This began when he received an operation to remove a cataract from his eye, after which he was left blind for eleven months. During this period of rest and recuperation, he contemplated questions surrounding the origins of the German language and the use of runes. He subsequently produced a manuscript detailing what he deemed to be a proto-language of the Aryan race, in which he claimed that occult insight had enabled him to interpret the letters and sounds of both runes and emblems and glyphs found on ancient inscriptions. Terming it "a monumental pseudo-science", Goodrick-Clarke also noted that it constituted "the masterpiece of his occult-nationalist researches". List sent a copy to the Imperial Academy of Sciences in Vienna, but they declined to publish it. In 1903 List published an article in Die Gnosis magazine, which reflected a clear influence from the ideas of the Theosophical Society.

List had occasionally used the title of von in his name from 1903 onward, but began using it permanently in 1907. The term was used to denote that an individual was a member of the nobility, and when the nobility archive ordered an official enquiry into List's use of the term, he was called before magistrates in October 1907. He defended his usage of the term with the claim that he was the descendant of aristocrats from Lower Austria and Styria, and that his great-grandfather had abandoned the title to become an inn keeper. Goodrick-Clarke noted that whatever the legitimacy of List's unproven claims, claiming the title of von was "an integral part of [List's] religious fantasy" because in his mind it connected him to the ancient Wotanist priesthood, from whom he believed Austria's aristocrats were descended. It is possible that List decided to adopt the usage of the term after his friend, the fellow prominent Ariosophist Lanz von Liebenfels, had done so in 1903.

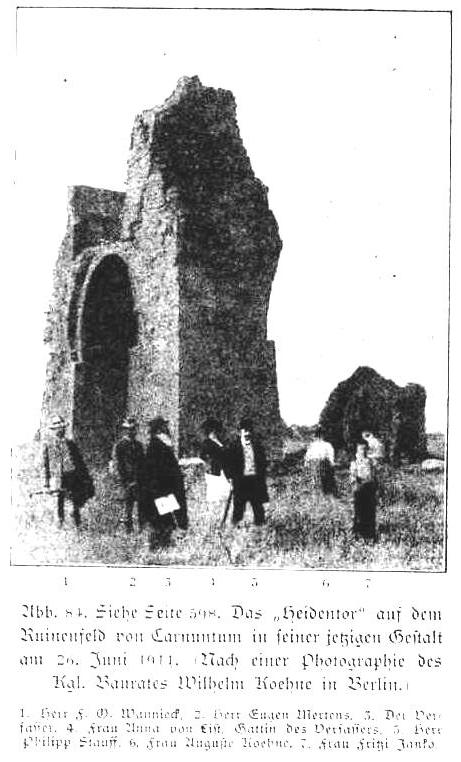
An 'Armanist pilgrimage' to the Pagan Gate, June 1911. List is third from left.

List's popularity among the Pan-Germanist movement resulted in suggestions that a society devoted to the promotion of List's work be established. This materialised as the Guido-von-List-Gesellschaft in March 1908, which was largely funded by the Wannieck family but which also included many prominent figures from middle and upper-class Austrian and German society. At Midsummer 1911, List founded the High Armanen Order (Hoher Armanen-Ordem), or HAO, as an inner group of Armanist practitioners within the List Society with whom he went on pilgrimages to various places that he believed had been ancient cultic sites associated with the worship of Wotan. He operated as leader of this group, using the title of Grand Master. The List Society also produced six booklets authored by List himself between 1908 and 1911. Titled "Ario-Germanic research reports", they covered List's opinions on the meaning and magical power of runes, the ancient Wotanic priesthood, Austrian folklore and place-names, and the secret messages within heraldic devices. In 1914, the Society then published List's work on runes and language that the Imperial Academy had turned down. The first three of these publications furthered List's reputation across both the völkisch and nationalist subcultures within both Austria and Germany. Many other writers were inspired by List, with a number of works being specifically dedicated to him. The editor of Prana, Johannes Balzli, authored a biography of List that was published in 1917.

During World War I, List erroneously proclaimed that there would be victory for the Central Powers of Germany and Austria-Hungary, claiming to have learned this information from a vision that he experienced in 1917. By 1918, List was in declining health, furthered by the food shortages experienced in Vienna as a result of the war. In the spring of 1919, at the age of 70, List and his wife set off to recuperate and meet followers at the manor house of Eberhard von Brockhusen, a List Society patron who lived at Langen in Brandenburg, Germany. On arrival at the Anhalter Station at Berlin, List felt too exhausted to continue the journey. After a doctor had diagnosed a lung inflammation his health deteriorated quickly, and he died in a Berlin guesthouse on the morning of 17 May 1919. He was cremated in Leipzig and his ashes laid in an urn and then buried at the Vienna Central Cemetery, Zentralfriedhof. An obituary of List authored by Berlin journalist Philipp Stauff then appeared in the Münchener Beobachter.

== Ideology ==
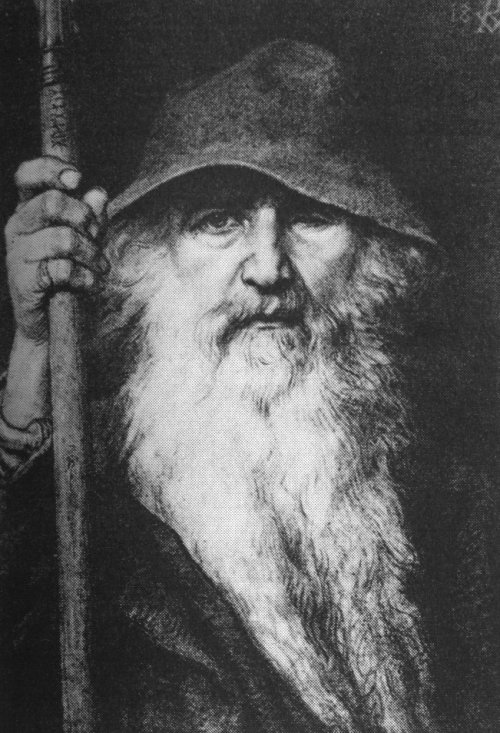
Odin the Wanderer (1896) by Georg von Rosen

List promoted a religion termed "Wotanism", which he saw as the exoteric, outer form of pre-Christian Germanic religion, while "Armanism" was the term he applied to what he believed were the esoteric, secret teachings of this ancient belief system. He believed that while Wotanism expounded polytheism for the wider population, those who were members of the Armanist elite were aware of the reality of monotheism. List's Armanism would later be classified as a form of "Ariosophy", a term which was coined by Lanz von Liebenfels in 1915. Goodrick-Clarke considered List's ideas to be a "unique amalgam of nationalist mythology and esotericism". Religious studies scholar Olav Hammer noted that List's Wotanism "increasingly came to consist of an original synthesis of his reading of Germanic mythology with Theosophy". List's early Theosophical influence came largely from the writings of German Theosophist Max Ferdinand Sebaldt von Werth, who had combined Theosophical ideas with his own interpretations of Germanic mythology and emphasis on racial doctrines, thus anticipating Ariosophy. In later work, this Theosophical influence over List's thinking grew, and he began referencing works such as Helena Blavatsky's Die Geheimlehre ("The Secret Doctrine") and William Scott-Elliot's The Lost Lemuria in his publications. He expressed the view that Norse mythology accorded with – and thus proved – the cosmogonical teachings of Theosophy.

Much of List's understanding of the ancient past was based not on empirical research into historical, archaeological, and folkloric sources, but rather on ideas that he claimed to have received as a result of clairvoyant illumination. Later writer Richard Rudgley thus characterised List's understanding of the "pagan past" as an "imaginative reconstruction". List's Wotanism was constructed largely on the Prose Edda and the Poetic Edda, two Old Norse textual sources which had been composed in Iceland during the late Middle Ages; he nevertheless believed that they accurately reflected the belief systems of Germany, having been authored by "Wotanist" refugees fleeing Christianity. He believed that prior to the spread of Christianity into Northern Europe, there had once been a culturally unified German civilisation that had been spread across much of Europe, which came to be degraded and divided under the impact of Christianity. He believed that the Danubian region of modern Austria had thus been part of this unified German civilisation before the growth of the Roman Empire, an idea in contrast to the view accepted by historians of the time that linguistically German communities only settled in the area during the reign of the Frankish king Charlemagne in the ninth century CE, pushing out the pre-existing linguistically Celtic groups.

=== Runes and the Armanenschaft ===
List believed that the basic teachings of Wotanism were found in the runic alphabet, believing that they could be deciphered by linking these letters with particular runic spells which appear in the Old Norse Havamal. He claimed to have deciphered these secret meanings himself, translating them as statements such as "Know yourself, then you know everything", "Do not fear death, he cannot kill you", "Marriage is the root of the Aryan race!", and "Man is one with God!" List emphasised the importance of a mystical union between humans and the universe, viewing divinity as being immanent in nature, with all life being an emanation of it. Connected to this, he believed in a close identification between the racial group – the volk or folk – and the natural world. List believed that human beings had an immortal soul, and that it would be reincarnated according to the laws of karma until eventually uniting with divinity.

Runic Circle of the Armanen Futharkh

In the 1890s, List initially devised the idea that ancient German society had been led by a hierarchical system of initiates, the Armanenschaft, an idea which had developed into a key part of his thinking by 1908. List's image of the Armanenschaft's structure was based largely on his knowledge of Freemasonry. He claimed that the ancient brotherhood had consisted of three degrees, each with their own secret signs, grips, and passwords. He believed that the Armanenschaft had societal control over the ancient German people, acting as teachers, priests, and judges. In List's interpretation of history, the Christian missionaries persecuted the Armanenschaft, resulting in many fleeing northward into Scandinavia and Iceland. He believed that they developed a secretive language for transmitting their teachings, known as kala.

List claimed that after the Christianisation of Northern Europe, the Armanist teachings were passed down in secret, thus resulting in their transmission through later esoteric traditions such as Freemasonry and Rosicrucianism. He also claimed that the Medieval Knights Templar had been keepers of these Armanist secrets, and that they had been persecuted by the Christian establishment as a result of this; he believed that the deity they were accused of worshiping, Baphomet, was actually a sigil of the Maltese Cross representing Armanist teachings. According to List, a number of prominent Renaissance humanists – including Giovanni Pico della Mirandola, Giordano Bruno, Johannes Trithemius, Heinrich Cornelius Agrippa, and Johann Reuchlin – were also aware of this ancient Armanist teaching, with List claiming that he was actually the reincarnation of Reuchlin. In addition, List claimed that in the eighth century, Armanists had imparted their secret teachings to the Jewish rabbis of Cologne in the hope of preserving them from Christian persecution; he believed that these teachings became the Kabbalah, which he therefore reasoned was an ancient German and not Jewish innovation, thus legitimising its usage in his own teachings. Rudgley stated that this "tortuous argument" was used to support List's antisemitic agenda.

=== Millenarian views ===
List generally saw the world in which he was living as one of degeneration, comparing it with the societies of the Late Roman and Byzantine Empires. He bemoaned the decline of the rural peasantry through urbanisation, having witnessed how Vienna's population tripled between 1870 and 1890, resulting in overcrowding, a growth in diseases like tuberculosis, and a severe strain on the city's resources. A staunch monarchist, he opposed all forms of democracy, feminism, and modern trends in the arts, such as those of the Vienna Secessionists. Influenced by the Pan-Germanist politician Georg Ritter von Schönerer and his Away from Rome! movement, List decried the growing influence of linguistically Slavic communities within the Austro-Hungarian Empire. He was opposed to laissez-faire capitalism and large-scale enterprise, instead favouring an economic system based on small-scale artisans and craftsmen, being particularly unhappy with the decline in tradesmen's guilds. He was similarly opposed to the modern banking sector and financial institutions, deeming it to be dominated by Jews; in criticising these institutions, he expressed antisemitic sentiments. Such views of the country's economic situation were not uncommon in Austria at the time, having become particularly widespread following the Panic of 1873. The later Heathen and runologist Edred Thorsson noted that List's "theories were to some degree based on the anti-semitic dogmas of the day", while Hammer stated that the Ariosophic tradition promulgated by List and others was "unambiguously racist and anti-semitic".

List believed that the degradation of modern Western society was as a result of a conspiracy orchestrated by a secret organisation known as the Great International Party, an idea influenced by antisemitic conspiracy theories. Adopting a millenarianist perspective, he believed in the imminent defeat of this enemy and the establishment of a better future for the Ario-German race. In April 1915 he welcomed the start of World War I as a conflict that would bring about the defeat of Germany's enemies and the establishment of a golden age for the new Ario-German Empire. Toward the war's end, he believed that the German war dead would be reincarnated as a generation who would push through with a national revolution and establish this new, better society. For List, this better future would be intricately connected to the ancient past, reflecting his belief in the cyclical nature of time, something which he had adopted both from a reading of Norse mythology and from Theosophy. Reflecting his monarchist beliefs, he envisioned this future state as being governed by the House of Habsburg, with a revived feudal system of land ownership being introduced through which land would be inherited by a man's eldest son. In List's opinion, this new empire would be highly hierarchical, with non-Aryans being subjugated under the Aryan population and opportunities for education and jobs in public service being restricted to those deemed racially pure. He envisioned this Empire following the Wotanic religion which he promoted.

== Influence and legacy ==
Writing in 2003, the historian of religion Mattias Gardell believed that List had become the "revered guru of Ariosophic paganism". Gardell considered the Austrian esotericist to have been "a legend in his lifetime", with List's ideas being embraced by many völkisch groups in Germany. German members of the List Society included Philipp Stauff, Eberhard von Brockhusen, Karl Hellwig, Georg Hauerstein, and Bernhard Koerner, who were founding members of the Reichshammerbund and Germanenorden; through the Germanenorden's Munich offshoot, the Thule Society, a vague lineage can be drawn between the List Society and the early Nazi Party as it was established after World War I. List's ideas of Ariosophy and the occult influenced the beliefs of the German Faith Movement in Nazi Germany to revive pre-Christian Germanic spiritual traditions focused on Aryan racial purity. Goodrick-Clarke opined that "this channel of influence certainly carries most weight in any assessment of List's historical importance." Rudgley claimed that List's vision of a future German Empire constituted "a blueprint for the Nazi regime".

Other German völkisch figures promoted Listian ideas to the wider public during and after the First World War. Further individuals—notably Rudolf John Gorsleben, Werner von Bülow, Friedrich Bernhard Marby, Herbert Reichstein, and Frodi Ingolfson Werhmann—took List's Ariosophical ideas alongside those of Liebenfels and built upon them further, resulting in a flourishing Ariosophical movement in the late 1920s and 1930s, with some of these individuals being within the coterie of prominent Nazi Heinrich Himmler and influencing the symbolism and rituals of the SS. He has also exerted an influence on the Australian Odinist and Ariosophist Alexander Rud Mills.

Both Goodrick-Clarke and later the religious studies scholar Stefanie von Schnurbein described List as "the pioneer of völkisch rune occultism", with the latter adding that "the roots of modern esoteric runology are found in Guido List's visions." In 1984, Thorsson expressed the view that List's impact was such that he was "able to shape the runic theories of German magicians (although not necessarily their political ones) from that time to the present day." In 1976, two longstanding activists in the völkisch and far-right milieu, Adolf and Sigrun Schleipfer, established the Armanen-Order in order to revive List's ideas, adopting a strong anti-modernist stance and a desire to revive pre-Christian religion. It was through the Armanen-Order that Thorsson, who joined it, learned about List's work. Thorsson then spearheaded "the post-war runic revival", founding an initiatory organisation known as the Rune Gild in 1980. Thorsson was responsible for translating a number of List's works into English, alongside those of other völkisch mystics like Siegfried Adolf Kummer. These publications brought awareness of List to an English-speaking readership, with his 1988 translation of List's The Secret of the Runes initiating a surge of interest in Ariosophy among the Heathen community of the United States. List's runology also made an appearance in Stephan Grundy's 1990 book Teutonic Magic. List's Armanist ideas have been cited as an inspiration for the American Odinist militant David Lane, with Wotansvolk, a group that Lane was involved in establishing, viewing their own activism as a continuation of that begun by List. List was also of interest to the Heathen Michael Moynihan, who spent time visiting the places in Austria that are associated with List's life.

== Bibliography ==
A bibliography of List's published books is provided in Goodrick-Clarke's study The Occult Roots of Nazism.

Year of publication	Title	Place of Publication
1888	Carnuntum. Historischer Roman aus dem vierten Jahrhundert n. Chr. (two volumes)	Berlin
1891	Deutsch-Mythologische Landschaftsbilder	Berlin
1892	Tauf-, Hochzeits- und Bestattungs-Gebräuche und deren Ursprung	Salzburg
1893	Litteraria sodalitas Danubiana	Vienna
1894	Jung Diether's Heimkehr. Eine Sonnwend-Geschichte aus dem Jahre 488 n. Chr.	Brno
1894	Der Wala Erweckung	Vienna
1895	Walküren-Weihe. Epische Dichtung	Brno
1895	Pipara. Die Germanin im Cäsarenpurpur (two volumes)	Leipzig
1898	Niederösterreichisches Winzerbüchlein	Vienna
1898	Der Unbesiegbare. Ein Grundzug germanischer Weltanschauung	Vienna
1899	König Vannius. Ein deutsches Königsdrama	Brno
1900	Der Wiederaufbau von Carnuntum	Vienna
1901	Sommer-Sonnwend-Feuerzauber. Skaldisches Weihespiel	Vienna
1903	Alraunen-Mären. Kulturhistorische Novellen und Dichtungen aus germanischer Vorzeit	Vienna
1903	Das Goldstück. Ein Liebesdrama in fünf Aufzügen	Vienna
1908	Das Geheimnis der Runen	Gross-Lichterfelde
1908	Die Armanenschaft der Ario-Germanen	Leipzig and Vienna
1908	Die Rita der Ario-Germanen	Leipzig and Vienna
1909	Die Namen der Völkerstämme Germaniens und deren Deutung	Leipzig and Vienna
1909/10	Die Religion der Ario-Germanen im ihrer Esoterik und Exoterik	Zurich
1910	Der Bilderschrift der Ario-Germanen (Ario-Germanische Hieroglyphik)	Leipzig and Vienna
1911	Die Armanenschaft der Ario-Germanen. Zweiter Teil	Leipzig and Vienna
1911	Der Übergang vom Wuotanstum zum Christensum	Zurich
1913	Die Armanenschaft der Ario-Germanen. Erster Teil (second edition)	Vienna
1913	Deutsch-Mythologische Landschaftsbilder (second edition)	Vienna
1914	Die Ursprache der Ario-Germanen und ihre Mysteriensprache	Leipzig and Vienna
