= Adolf Hitler's rise to power =

Events leading to Hitler's dictatorship of Germany

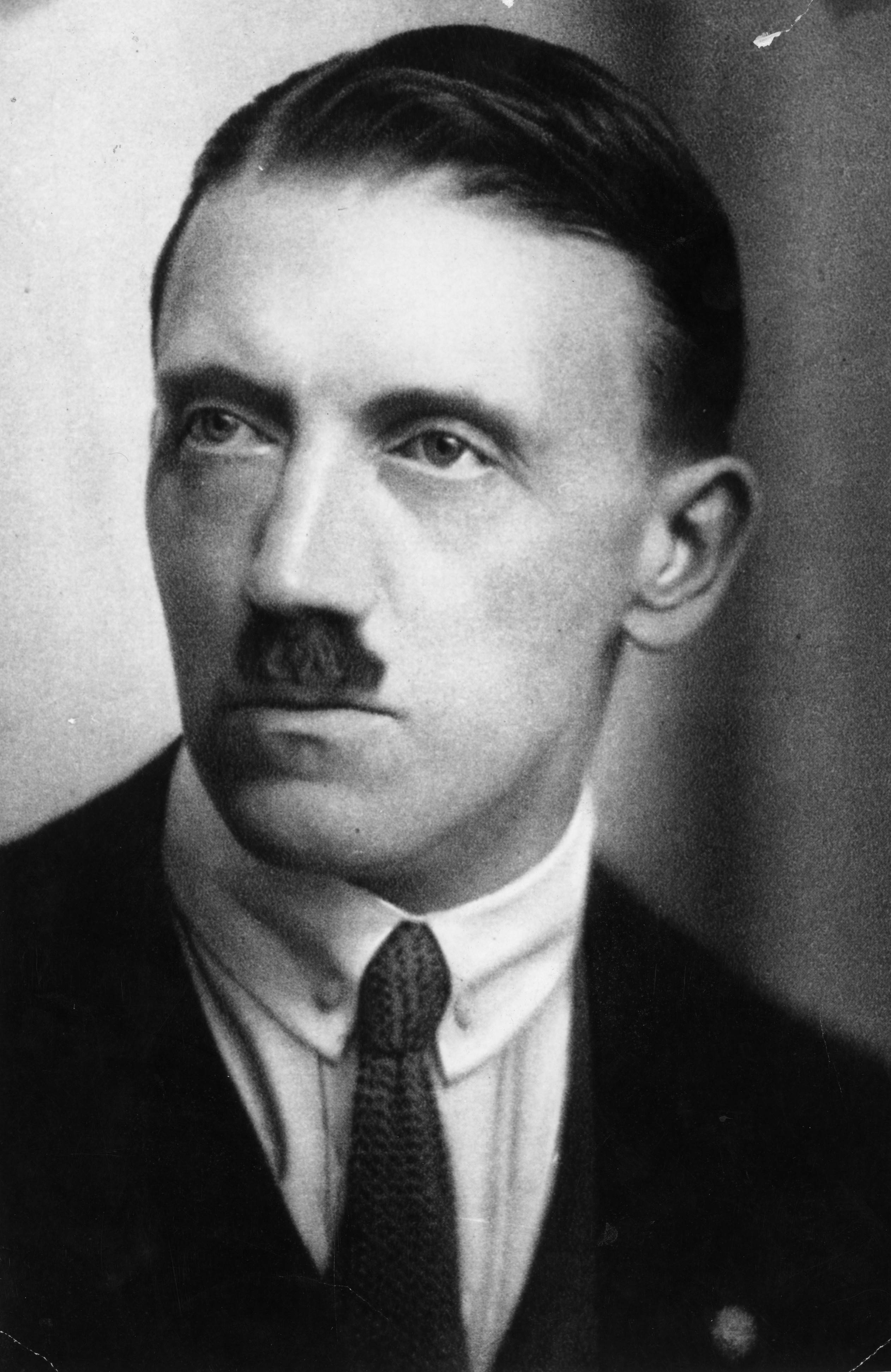
Hitler, c. 1923

The rise to power of Adolf Hitler, the dictator of Germany during the Nazi era from 1933 until his suicide in 1945, began in the newly established Weimar Republic in September 1919, when Hitler joined the Deutsche Arbeiterpartei (DAP; German Workers' Party). He quickly rose to a place of prominence and became one of its most popular speakers. In an attempt to more broadly appeal to larger segments of the population and win over German workers, the party name was changed to the Nationalsozialistische Deutsche Arbeiterpartei (NSDAP; National Socialist German Workers' Party), commonly known as the Nazi Party, and a new platform was adopted. Hitler was made the party leader in 1921 after he threatened to otherwise leave. By 1922, his control over the party was unchallenged. The Nazis were a right-wing party, but in the early years they also had anti-bourgeois elements. Hitler later initiated a purge of these elements and reaffirmed the Nazi Party's support for collaboration with German businesses. This included killings of Hitler's critics within the party during the Night of the Long Knives, which also served as a tool to secure power.

In 1923, Hitler attempted a coup in Bavaria, known as the Beer Hall Putsch. He was arrested and put on trial, which garnered him national fame. He was sentenced to five years in fortress confinement, but served only nine months. During this time, he wrote Mein Kampf, which became the handbook of his ideology of Nazism. Once released, Hitler switched tactics, opting to instead seize power through legal and democratic means. During the 1920s, he and the Nazis ran on a platform of anti-communism, antisemitism, and ultranationalism. Party leaders vociferously criticized the ruling democratic government and the Treaty of Versailles, while promising to turn Germany into a world power. Most Germans were indifferent to Hitler's rhetoric as the German economy began to recover, in large part due to loans from the United States under the Dawes Plan. The German political landscape was dramatically affected by the Wall Street crash of 1929. The Great Depression severely weakened the German economy and further polarized German politics. During this tumultuous time, the German Communist Party also began campaigning and called for a revolution. Some business leaders, fearful of a communist takeover, began supporting the Nazi Party.

Hitler ran for the presidency in 1932 and was defeated by the incumbent Paul von Hindenburg, but achieved a strong showing of second place in both rounds. In July 1932, the Nazis became the largest party in the Reichstag, albeit short of an absolute majority. Traditionally, the leader of the party who held the most seats in the Reichstag was appointed Chancellor. However, President von Hindenburg was hesitant to appoint Hitler. Following several backroom negotiations, which included industrialists, Hindenburg's son Oskar, former chancellor Franz von Papen, and Hitler, Hindenburg acquiesced and on 30 January 1933, he formally appointed Hitler as Germany's new chancellor.

The groundwork for Hitler's dictatorship was laid when the Reichstag was set on fire in February 1933. Communists were blamed for the arson and Hitler convinced Hindenburg to pass the Reichstag Fire Decree, which severely curtailed the liberties and rights of German citizens. Subsequently, he began arguing for more drastic means to curtail political opposition, and proposed the Enabling Act of 1933. This law gave the German government the power to override individual rights prescribed by the constitution, and vested the chancellor with emergency powers to pass and enforce laws without parliamentary oversight. The law came into force in March, and by April, Hitler held de facto dictatorial powers and ordered the construction of the first concentration camp in Germany at Dachau for communists and other political opponents. Hitler's rise to power was completed in August 1934 when, after Hindenburg's death, Hitler merged the chancellery with the presidency into the title of Führer ("leader").

Hitler's rise to power was aided by his willingness to use violence in advancing his political objectives and to recruit party members willing to do the same. In addition to electoral battles in which Hitler participated as a speaker and organizer, violent street battles took place between the Communists' Rotfrontkämpferbund and the Nazis' Sturmabteilung (SA). Once the dictatorship was firmly established, the Nazis themselves created a mythology surrounding their rise to power. German propaganda described this time period as either the Kampfzeit (the time of struggle) or the Kampfjahre (years of struggle).

== Influences from early Germany ==
Historians have commented on the influence of German Chancellor Otto von Bismarck's process of "negative integration" as setting a tone of exclusion in early Germany, which had a lasting influence on later German nationalism. Bismarck sought to overcome the religious and political divisions in early Germany by rallying the populace against a common enemy. Initially Bismarck ran a campaign against the Catholic church from 1873 to the late 1870s, referred to as Kulturkampf, questioning whether they were loyal to Berlin or other Catholic states. Rather than uniting the German people, it instead resulted in a bolstering of support to the Catholic church, alienating an important religious minority. In 1878, Bismarck then introduced a number of anti-socialist laws that would be in effect from 1878 to 1890 in an attempt to alienate the Social Democratic Party. While some sections of German society were united by this, many industrial workers rallied to the SDP. Historians have expressed that as the German state was still very new at the time, it was therefore impressionable; Bismarck's strategy of confrontation rather than consensus set a tone of either being loyal to the government or an enemy of the state, which directly influenced German nationalist sentiment and the later Nazi movement.

== Early steps (1918–1924) ==
Adolf Hitler became involved with the fledgling German Workers' Party after the First World War. He did not like the name of the organisation and proposed to call it the 'Social Revolutionary Party.' He later transformed it into the Nazi Party and set the violent tone of the movement early, by forming the paramilitary Sturmabteilung (SA). Catholic Bavaria resented rule from Protestant Berlin, and Hitler at first saw revolution in Bavaria as a means to power. An early attempt at a coup d'état, the November 1923 Beer Hall Putsch in Munich, proved fruitless, and Hitler was imprisoned for leading the putsch. He used this time to write Mein Kampf, in which he argued that effeminate Jewish–Christian ethics were enfeebling Europe, and that Germany was in need of an uncompromising strongman to restore itself and build an empire. Learning from the failed coup, he decided on the tactic of pursuing power through legal means rather than seizing control of the government by force.

=== From Armistice (November 1918) to party membership (September 1919) ===
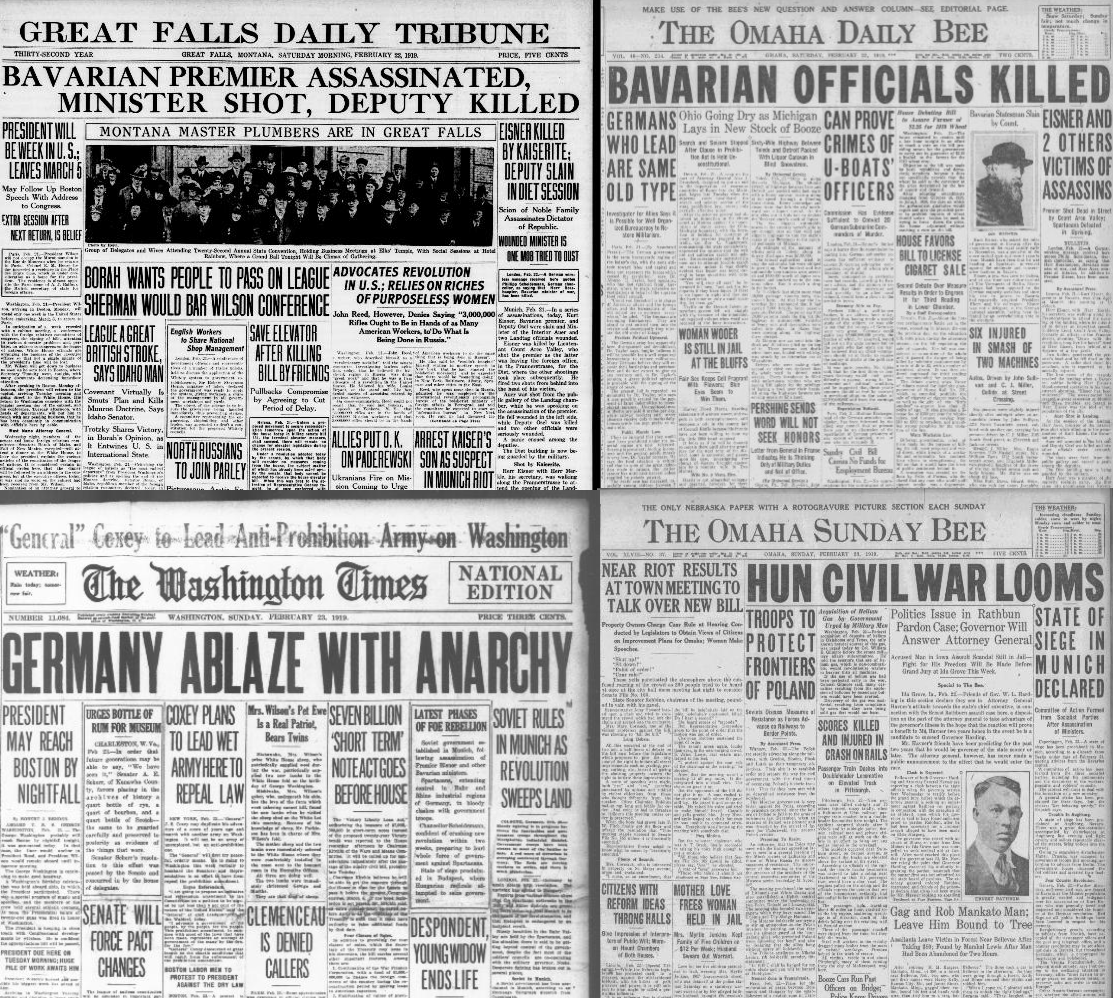
February 1919 United States news coverage of the unrest in Germany

In 1914, after being granted permission from King Ludwig III of Bavaria, the 25-year-old Austrian-born Hitler enlisted in a Bavarian regiment of the German Army, although he was not yet a German citizen. For over four years (August 1914 – November 1918), Germany was a major participant in World War I. (Note: Despite his receipt of several medals and decorations (including twice with the prestigious Iron Cross, both First and Second Class), Hitler was promoted in rank only once, to corporal (Gefreiter). Toland 1976, pp. 84–88.) After fighting on the Western Front ended in November 1918, (Note: The Armistice, ceasing active hostilities, was signed and effective 11 November 1918. Hitler, in hospital at the time, was informed of the upcoming cease-fire and the other consequences of Germany's defeat and surrender in the field – including Kaiser Wilhelm II's abdication, and a revolution leading to the proclamation of a republic in Berlin to replace the centuries-old Hohenzollern monarchy – on Sunday morning, 10 November, by a pastor attending to patients. Days after digesting this traumatic news, by his own account Hitler made his decision: "... my own fate became known to me ... I ... decided to go into politics." Hitler 1999, p. 206.) Hitler was discharged on 19 November from the Pasewalk hospital (Note: Hitler, having been born in the defunct Austro-Hungarian Empire to Austrian parents, was not a German citizen, but had managed to enlist in a Bavarian regiment, where he served on the front lines as a runner. He was wounded twice in action; at the time of the Armistice, he was recovering in a German hospital (in Pomerania northeast of Berlin) from temporary blindness that had resulted from a mid-October British gas attack at the last Battle of Ypres. Shirer 1960, pp. 28–30; Toland 1976, p. 86.) and returned to Munich, which at the time was in a state of socialist upheaval. Arriving on 21 November, he was assigned to 7th Company of the 1st Replacement Battalion of the 2nd Infantry Regiment. In December he was reassigned to a prisoner-of-war camp in Traunstein as a guard. He remained there until the camp dissolved in January 1919, after which he returned to Munich and spent a couple weeks on guard duty at the city's main train station (Hauptbahnhof) through which soldiers had been traveling. (Note: Guard duty at a POW camp to the East, near the Austrian border. The prisoners were Russian, and Hitler had volunteered for the posting. Shirer 1960, p. 34; Toland 1976, p. xx.)

During this time a number of notable Germans were assassinated, including socialist Kurt Eisner, (Note: As a socialist journalist, he organised the Socialist Revolution that overthrew the Wittelsbach monarchy in Bavaria in November 1918, which led to his being described as "the symbol of the Bavarian revolution".) who was shot dead by a German nationalist on 21 February 1919. His rival Erhard Auer was also wounded in an attack. Other acts of violence were the killings of both Major Paul Ritter von Jahreiß and the conservative MP Heinrich Osel. In this political chaos Berlin sent in the military – called the "White Guards of Capitalism" by the communists. On 3 April 1919, Hitler was elected as the liaison of his military battalion and again on 15 April. During this time, he urged his unit to stay out of the fighting and not to join either side.

The Bavarian Soviet Republic was officially crushed on 6 May, when Lieutenant General Burghard von Oven and his forces declared Munich secure. In the aftermath of arrests and executions, Hitler denounced a fellow liaison, Georg Dufter, as a Soviet "radical rabble-rouser". Other testimony he gave to the military board of inquiry allowed them to root out other members of the military that "had been infected with revolutionary fervor." For his anti-communist views he was allowed to avoid discharge when his unit was disbanded in May 1919. (Note: Toland suggests that Hitler's assignment to this department was partially a reward for his "exemplary" service in the front lines, and partially because the responsible officer felt sorry for Hitler as having no friends, but being very willing to do whatever the army required. Toland 1976, p. xx.)

In June 1919, Hitler was moved to the demobilization office of the 2nd Infantry Regiment. Around this time the German military command released an edict that the army's main priority was to "carry out, in conjunction with the police, stricter surveillance of the population ... so that the ignition of any new unrest can be discovered and extinguished." In May 1919, Karl Mayr became commander of the 6th Battalion of the guards' regiment in Munich and from 30 May the head of the "Education and Propaganda Department" of the General Command von Oven and the Group Command No. 4 (Department Ib). In this capacity as head of the intelligence department, Mayr recruited Hitler as an undercover agent in early June 1919. Under Captain Mayr, "national thinking" courses were arranged at the Reichswehrlager Lechfeld near Augsburg, with Hitler attending from 10 to 19 July. During this time Hitler so impressed Mayr that he assigned him to an anti-Bolshevik "educational commando" as 1 of 26 instructors in the summer of 1919. (Note: Apparently someone in an army "educational session" had made a remark that Hitler deemed "pro-Jewish" and Hitler reacted with characteristic ferocity. Shirer states that Hitler had attracted the attention of a right-wing university professor who was engaged to educate enlisted men in "proper" political belief, and that the professor's recommendation to an officer resulted in Hitler's advancement. Shirer 1960, p. 35.) (Note: "I was offered the opportunity of speaking before a larger audience; and ... it was now corroborated: I could 'speak.' No task could make me happier than this; ... I was able to perform useful services to ... the army. ... [I]n ... my lectures I led many hundreds ... of comrades back to their people and fatherland." Hitler 1999, pp. 215–216.)

In July 1919, Hitler was appointed Verbindungsmann (intelligence agent) of an Aufklärungskommando (reconnaissance commando) of the Reichswehr, both to influence other soldiers and to infiltrate the German Workers' Party (DAP). The DAP had been formed by Anton Drexler, Karl Harrer and others, through amalgamation of other groups, on 5 January 1919 at a small gathering at the restaurant Fuerstenfelder Hof in Munich. While he studied the activities of the DAP, Hitler became impressed with Drexler's antisemitic, nationalist, anti-capitalist and anti-Marxist ideas.

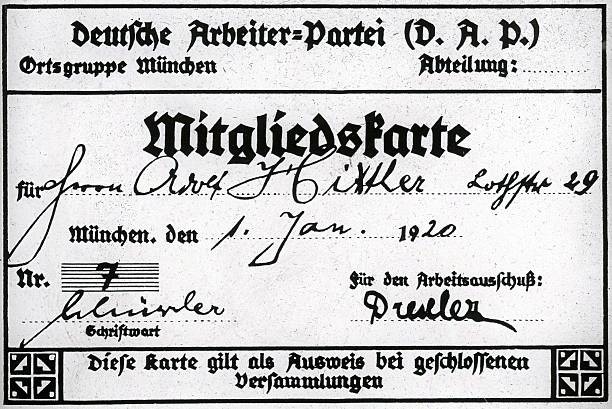
Hitler's membership card for the German Workers' Party (DAP)

During the 12 September 1919 meeting, (Note: Held, like so many meetings of the period, in a beer cellar, this time the Sterneckerbrau. Hitler 1999, p. 218.) Hitler took umbrage with comments made by an audience member that were directed against Gottfried Feder, the speaker, an economist with whom Hitler was acquainted due to a lecture Feder delivered in an army "education" course. (Note: Feder had formed the German Fighting League for the Breaking of Interest Slavery. The notion of "Breaking Interest Slavery" was, by Hitler's account, a "powerful slogan for this coming struggle." Hitler 1999, p. 213.) The audience member (in Mein Kampf, Hitler disparagingly referred to him as the "professor") asserted that Bavaria should be wholly independent from Germany and should secede from Germany and unite with Austria to form a new South German nation. (Note: According to Shirer, the seemingly preposterous "South German nation" idea actually had some popularity in Munich in the politically raucous atmosphere of Bavaria following the war. Shirer 1960, p. 36.) The volatile Hitler arose and scolded the man, eventually causing him to leave the meeting before its adjournment.

Impressed with Hitler's oratory skills, Drexler encouraged him to join the DAP. On the orders of his army superiors, Hitler applied to join the party. Within a week, Hitler received a postcard stating he had officially been accepted as a member and he should come to a "committee" meeting to discuss it. Hitler attended the "committee" meeting held at the run-down Alte Rosenbad beerhouse. Later Hitler wrote that joining the fledgling party "...was the most decisive resolve of my life. From here there was and could be no turning back. ... I registered as a member of the German Workers' Party and received a provisional membership card with the number 7". Normally, enlisted army personnel were not allowed to join political parties. However, in this case, Hitler had Captain Mayr's permission to join the DAP. Further, Hitler was allowed to stay in the army and receive his weekly pay of 20 gold marks.

=== From early party membership to the Hofbräuhaus Melée (November 1921) ===
Otto Strasser: What is the program of the NSDAP?
Hitler: The program is not the question. The only question is power.
Strasser: Power is only the means of accomplishing the program.
Hitler: These are the opinions of the intellectuals. We need power!

By early 1920, the DAP had grown to over 101 members, and Hitler received his membership card as member number 555 (the numbers started from 501). (Note: The membership numbers were artificially started at 501 because the DAP wanted to make itself look larger than it actually was. The membership numbers were also apparently issued alphabetically, and not chronologically, so one cannot infer that Hitler was in fact the party's 55th member. Toland 1976, p. 131. In a Hitler speech shown in Triumph of the Will, Hitler makes explicit reference to his being the seventh party member and he notes the same in Mein Kampf. Hitler 1999, p. 224.) Hitler's considerable oratory and propaganda skills were appreciated by the party leadership. With the support of Anton Drexler, Hitler became chief of propaganda for the party in early 1920 and his actions began to transform the party. He organised their biggest meeting yet, of 2,000 people, on 24 February 1920 in the Staatliches Hofbräuhaus in München. There Hitler announced the party's 25-point program (see National Socialist Program). He also engineered the name change of the DAP to the Nationalsozialistische Deutsche Arbeiterpartei – NSDAP (National Socialist German Workers' Party), later known to the rest of the world as the Nazi Party. (Note: The word "Nazi" is a contraction for Nationalsozialistische, but this contraction was not used by the party itself.) Hitler designed the party's banner of a swastika in a white circle on a red background. He was discharged from the army in March 1920 and began working full-time for the Nazi Party. Although the NSDAP claimed that Hitler received no income from them and lived on the fees he received from public speaking at non-party events, he was actually supported financially by several wealthy patrons and party sympathisers.

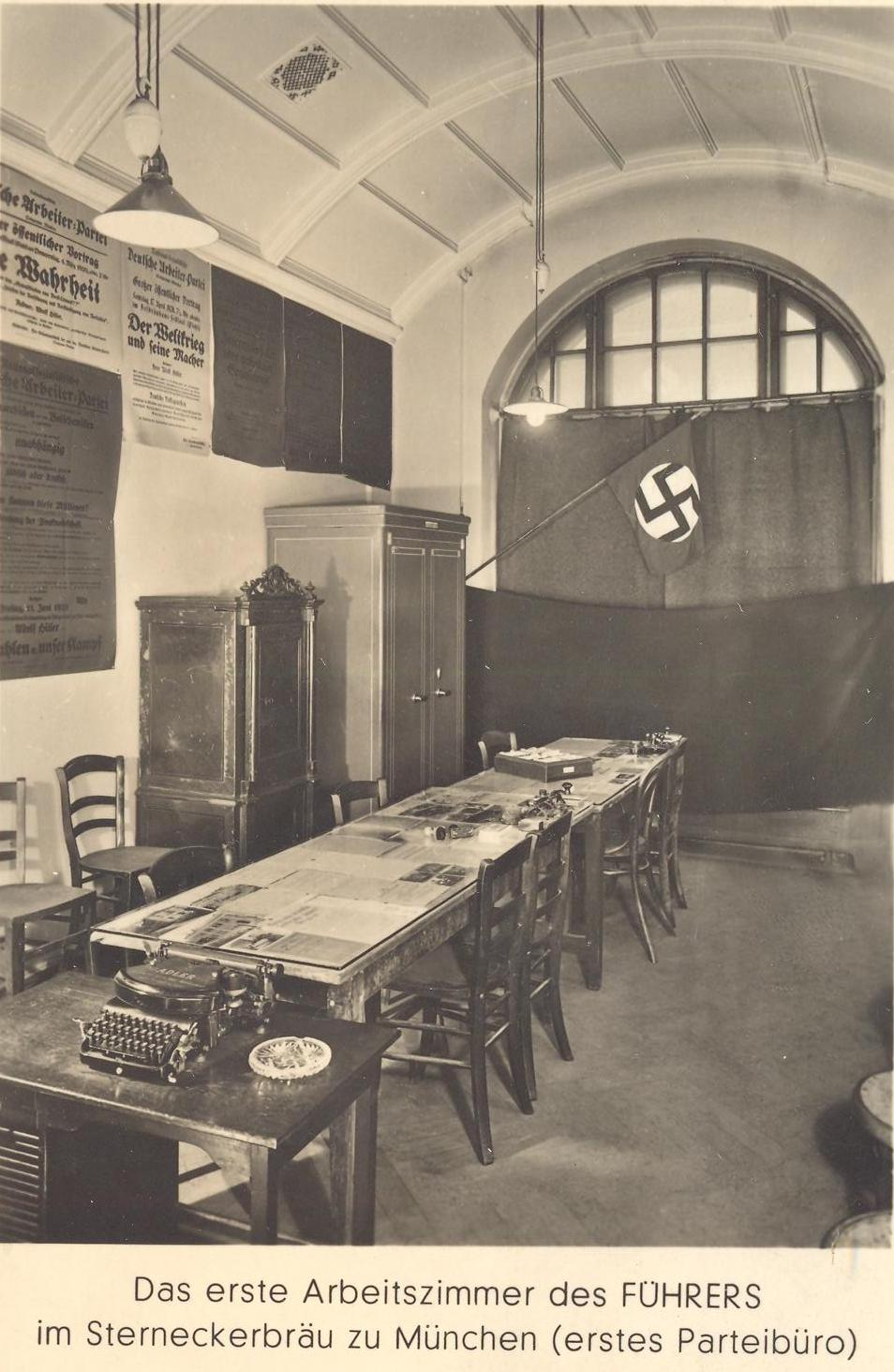
Hitler's first office in the Sterneckerbräu in Munich

In 1920, a small "hall protection" squad was organised around Emil Maurice. The group was first named the "Order troops" (Ordnertruppen). Later in August 1921, Hitler redefined the group, which became known as the "Gymnastic and Sports Division" of the party (Turn- und Sportabteilung). By the autumn of 1921 the group was being called the Sturmabteilung ("Storm Detachment") or SA, and by November 1921 the group was officially known by that name. Also in 1920, Hitler began to lecture in Munich beer halls, particularly the Hofbräuhaus, Sterneckerbräu and Bürgerbräukeller. Only Hitler was able to bring in the crowds for the party speeches and meetings. By this time, the police were already monitoring the speeches, and their own surviving records reveal that Hitler delivered lectures with titles such as Political Phenomenon, Jews and the Treaty of Versailles. At the end of the year, party membership was recorded at 2,000.

In June 1921, while Hitler and Dietrich Eckart were on a fundraising trip to Berlin, a mutiny broke out within the Nazi Party in Munich, its organizational home. Members of its executive committee wanted to merge with the rival German Socialist Party (DSP). Hitler returned to Munich on 11 July and angrily tendered his resignation. The committee members realised that the resignation of their leading public figure and speaker would mean the end of the party. Hitler announced he would rejoin on the condition that he would replace Drexler as party chairman and that the party headquarters would remain in Munich. The committee agreed, and he rejoined the party on 26 July as member 3,680. In the following days, Hitler spoke to several packed houses and defended himself, to thunderous applause. His strategy proved successful: at a general membership meeting, he was granted absolute powers as party chairman, with only one nay vote cast.

On 14 September 1921, Hitler and a substantial number of SA members and other Nazi Party adherents disrupted a meeting of the Bavarian League at the Löwenbräukeller. This federalist organization objected to the centralism of the Weimar Constitution but accepted its social program. The League was led by Otto Ballerstedt, an engineer whom Hitler regarded as "my most dangerous opponent". One Nazi, Hermann Esser, climbed upon a chair and shouted that the Jews were to blame for the misfortunes of Bavaria and the Nazis shouted demands that Ballerstedt yield the floor to Hitler. The Nazis beat up Ballerstedt and shoved him off the stage into the audience. Hitler and Esser were arrested and Hitler commented notoriously to the police commissioner, "It's all right. We got what we wanted. Ballerstedt did not speak."

Less than two months later, 4 November 1921, the Nazi Party held a large public meeting in the Munich Hofbräuhaus. After Hitler had spoken for some time, the meeting erupted into a melée in which a small company of SA defeated the opposition. For his part in these events, Hitler was eventually sentenced in January 1922 to three months' imprisonment for "breach of the peace", but only spent a little over one month at Stadelheim Prison in Munich.

=== From Beer Hall melée to Beer Hall coup d'état ===
In 1922 and early 1923, Hitler and the Nazi Party formed two organizations that would grow to have huge significance. The first began as the Jungsturm Adolf Hitler and the Jugendbund der NSDAP; they would later become the Hitler Youth. The other was the Stabswache (Staff Guard), which in May 1923 was renamed the Stoßtrupp-Hitler (Shock Troop-Hitler). This early incarnation of a bodyguard unit for Hitler would later become the Schutzstaffel (SS). Inspired by Benito Mussolini's March on Rome in 1922, Hitler decided that a coup d'état was the proper strategy to seize control of the German government. In May 1923, small elements loyal to Hitler within the Reichswehr helped the SA to illegally procure a barracks and its weaponry, but the order to march never came, possibly because Hitler had been warned by Army General Otto von Lossow that "he would be fired upon" by Reichswehr troops if they attempted a putsch.

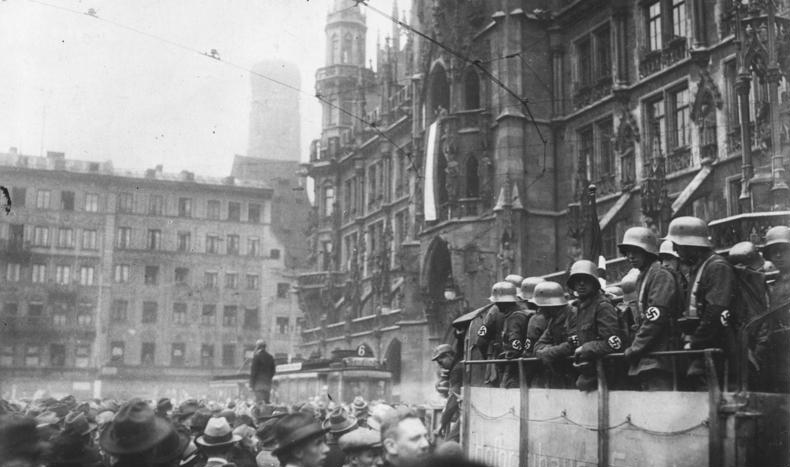
The Marienplatz in Munich during the Beer Hall Putsch on 9 November 1923

A pivotal moment came when Hitler led the Beer Hall Putsch, an attempted coup d'état on 8–9 November 1923. At the Bürgerbräukeller in Munich, Hitler and his deputies announced their plan: Bavarian government officials would be deposed, and Hitler installed at the head of government, with Munich then used as a base camp from which to march on Berlin. Nearly 2,000 Nazi Party members proceeded to the Marienplatz in Munich's city center, where they were met by a police cordon summoned to obstruct them. Sixteen Nazi Party members and four police officers were killed in the ensuing violence. Hitler briefly escaped the city but was arrested on 11 November 1923, and put on trial for high treason, which gained him widespread public attention.

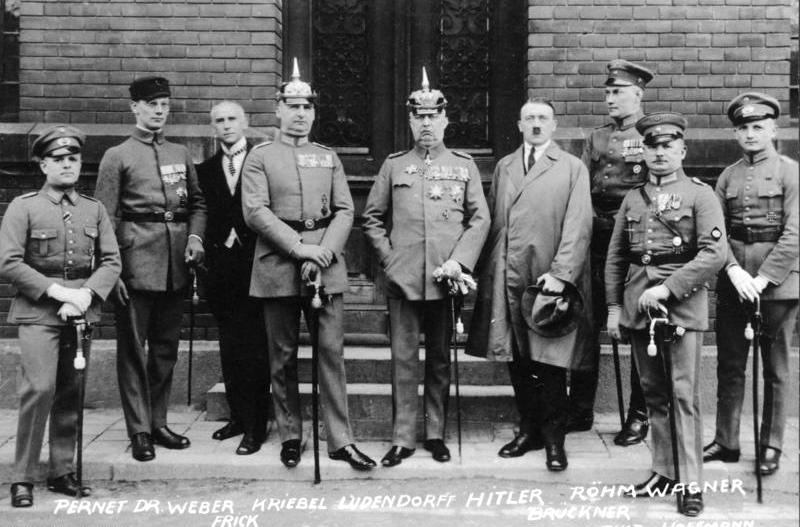
Defendants in the Beer Hall Putsch

The trial began in February 1924. Hitler endeavored to turn the tables and put democracy and the Weimar Republic on trial as traitors to the German people. Hitler was convicted and on 1 April sentenced to five years' of Festungshaft (fortress confinement) at Landsberg Prison. He received friendly treatment from the guards; he had a room with a view of the river, wore a tie, had regular visitors to his chambers, was allowed mail from supporters and was permitted the use of a private secretary.

Hitler's greatest worry during the trial was that he was at risk of being deported back to his native country Austria by the Bavarian government. However, the trial judge, Georg Neithardt, was sympathetic toward Hitler and held that the relevant laws of the Weimar Republic could not be applied to Hitler under the terms of the Protection of the Republic:

Hitler is a German-Austrian. He considered himself to be a German. In the opinion of the court, the meaning and the terms of section 9, para II of the Law for the Protection of the Republic cannot apply to a man who thinks and feels as German as Hitler, who voluntarily served for four and a half years in the German army at war, who attained high military honours through outstanding bravery in the face of the enemy, was wounded, suffered other damage to his health, and was released from the military into the control of the district Command Munich I."

Pardoned by the Bavarian Supreme Court, he was released from jail on 20 December 1924, after serving just nine months, against the state prosecutor's objections. Hitler used the time in Landsberg Prison to reconsider his political strategy and dictate the first volume of Mein Kampf (My Struggle; originally entitled Four and a Half Years of Struggle against Lies, Stupidity, and Cowardice), principally to his deputy Rudolf Hess. (Note: Hess participated in the putsch, but escaped police custody following its abortive end. He initially fled to Austria, but later turned himself in to the authorities. Nesbit & van Acker 2011, pp. 18–19.)

After the Beer Hall Putsch, the Nazi Party was banned in Bavaria, but it participated in 1924's two elections by proxy as the National Socialist Freedom Movement (NSFB) (combination of the Deutschvölkische Freiheitspartei (DVFP) and the Nazi Party (NSDAP)). In the May 1924 German federal election the party gained seats in the Reichstag, with 6.6% (1,918,329) voting for the Movement. In the December 1924 federal election, the National Socialist Freedom Movement lost 18 seats, only holding on to 14 seats, with 3% (907,242) of the electorate voting for Hitler's party. The Barmat Scandal was often used later in Nazi propaganda, both as an electoral strategy and as an appeal to anti-Semitism.

After some reflection, Hitler had determined that power was to be achieved not through revolution outside of the government, but rather through what he called "the path of legality" within the confines of the democratic system established in Weimar.

== Move towards power (1925–1930) ==
In the May 1928 federal election, the Nazi Party achieved just 12 seats in the Reichstag. The highest provincial gain was again in Bavaria (5.1%), though in three areas the Nazis failed to gain even 1% of the vote. Overall, the party gained 2.6% of the vote (810,100 votes). Partially due to the poor results, Hitler decided that Germans needed to know more about his goals. Despite being discouraged by his publisher, he wrote a second book that was discovered and released posthumously as the Zweites Buch. At this time the SA began a period of deliberate antagonism to the Roter Frontkämpferbund (Rotfront) by marching into Communist strongholds and starting violent altercations.

At the end of 1928, party membership was recorded at 130,000. In March 1925, Erich Ludendorff had represented the Nazi Party in the Presidential elections. He earned 280,000 votes (1.1%) and was the only candidate to poll fewer than a million votes. The battles on the streets grew increasingly violent. After the Rotfront interrupted a speech by Hitler, the SA marched into the streets of Nuremberg and killed two bystanders. Seeking revenge, the SA also stormed a Rotfront meeting on 25 August and days later the Berlin headquarters of the Communist Party of Germany (KPD) itself. In September, Goebbels led his men into Neukölln, a KPD stronghold, and the two warring parties exchanged pistol and revolver fire. The German referendum of 1929 was important as it gained the Nazi Party recognition and credibility it had never had before. In the late 1920s, seeing the party's lack of breakthrough into the mainstream, Goebbels proposed that instead of focusing all of their propaganda in major cities where there was competition from other political movements, they should instead begin holding rallies in rural areas where they would be more effective.

On the evening of 14 January 1930, at around ten o'clock, Horst Wessel was fatally shot in the face at point-blank range by two members of the KPD in Friedrichshain. The attack occurred after an argument with his landlady, who was a member of the KPD and contacted one of her Rotfront friends, Albert Hochter, who shot Wessel. Wessel had penned a song months before which would become a Nazi anthem as the Horst-Wessel-Lied. Goebbels seized upon the attack (and the weeks Wessel spent on his deathbed) to publicize the song, and the funeral was used as an anti-Communist propaganda opportunity for the Nazis. In May, Goebbels was convicted of "libeling" President Paul von Hindenburg and fined 800 marks. The conviction stemmed from a 1929 article by Goebbels in his newspaper Der Angriff. In June, Goebbels was charged with high treason by the prosecutor in Leipzig based on statements Goebbels had made in 1927, but after a four-month investigation it came to naught.

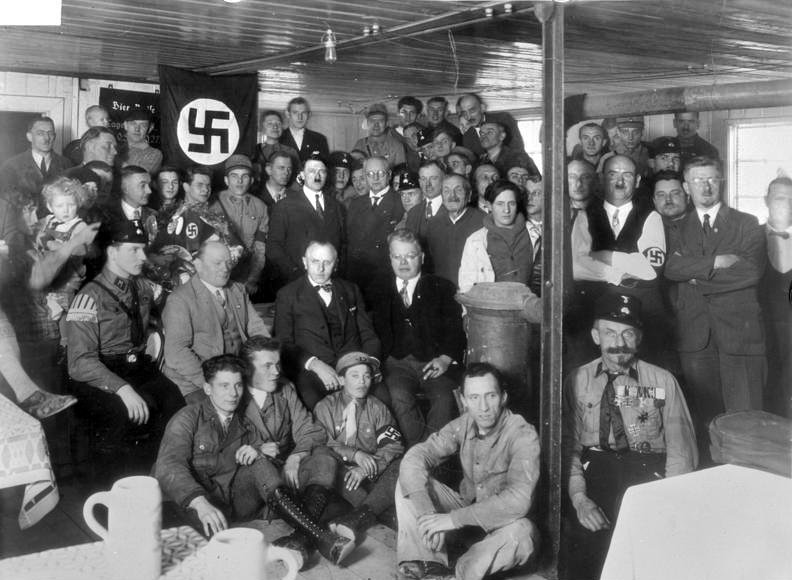
Hitler with Nazi Party members in December 1930

Against this backdrop, Hitler's party gained a significant victory in the Reichstag, obtaining 107 seats (18.3%, 6,409,600 votes) in the September 1930 federal election. The Nazis thereby became the second-largest party in Germany, and as historian Joseph Bendersky notes, they essentially became the "dominant political force on the right".

An unprecedented amount of money was thrown behind the campaign and political success increased the party's momentum as it recorded over 100,000 new members in the next few months following the election. Well over one million pamphlets were produced and distributed; sixty trucks were commandeered for use in Berlin alone. In areas where campaigning was less rigorous, the total share of the vote was as low as 9%. The Great Depression was also a factor in Hitler's electoral success. Against this legal backdrop, the SA began its first major anti-Jewish action on 13 October 1930, when groups of brownshirts smashed the windows of Jewish-owned stores at Potsdamer Platz.

== Weimar parties fail to halt Nazis ==
The Wall Street crash of 1929 heralded worldwide economic disaster. The people of Germany, tired of the old economic systems, voted for the Nazis and the Communists, who made great gains at the 1930 federal election. The Nazis and Communists between them secured almost 40% of Reichstag seats, which required the moderate parties to consider negotiations with anti-democrats. "The Communists", wrote historian Alan Bullock, "openly announced that they would prefer to see the Nazis in power rather than lift a finger to save the republic".

Leon Trotsky was especially critical of the shifting Comintern policy position under Joseph Stalin which directed German Communists to treat Social Democrats as "social fascists". Historian Bertrand Patenaude believed that the Comintern policy following the "Great Break" facilitated the rise of Hitler's party.

The Weimar political parties failed to stop the Nazi rise. Germany's Weimar political system made it difficult for chancellors to govern with a stable parliamentary majority, and successive chancellors instead relied on the president's emergency powers to govern. In 1931 the Nazi Party altered its strategy to engage in perpetual campaigning across the country, even outside of election time. From 1931 to 1933, the Nazis combined terror tactics with conventional campaigning – Hitler criss-crossed the nation by air, while SA troops paraded in the streets, beat up opponents, and broke up their meetings.

A middle-class liberal party strong enough to block the Nazis did not exist – the People's Party and the Democrats suffered severe losses to the Nazis at the polls. The Social Democrats were essentially a conservative trade union party, with ineffectual leadership. The Catholic Centre Party maintained its voting bloc, but was preoccupied with defending its own particular interests and wrote Bullock: "through 1932–3 ... was so far from recognizing the danger of a Nazi dictatorship that it continued to negotiate with the Nazis". The Communists meanwhile were engaging in violent clashes with Nazis on the streets, but Moscow had directed the Communist Party to prioritise destruction of the Social Democrats, seeing more danger in them as a rival for the loyalty of the working class. Nevertheless, wrote Bullock, the heaviest responsibility lay with the German right wing, who "forsook a true conservatism" and made Hitler their partner in a coalition government.

A 2008 systematic statistical analysis found that Weimar voting behavior was consistent with democratic elections in different times and places, contrary to other scholars treating the Weimar elections as a unique case. According to the analysis, the groups most hurt by the economic depression had diverging interests and so behaved differently. Those who were unemployed or at risk of unemployment disproportionately supported the Communists and sometimes the Social Democrats; the working poor who were hurt by the economy but not risking unemployment (self-employed shopkeepers and professionals, domestic employees, helping family members), especially in Protestant regions, disproportionately supported the Nazis; some working poor, particularly domestic and peasant workers, kept loyal to the Catholic Centre Party due to the Nazi agricultural policy failing to appeal to southern German farmers, as well as economic incentive from the Catholic Church.

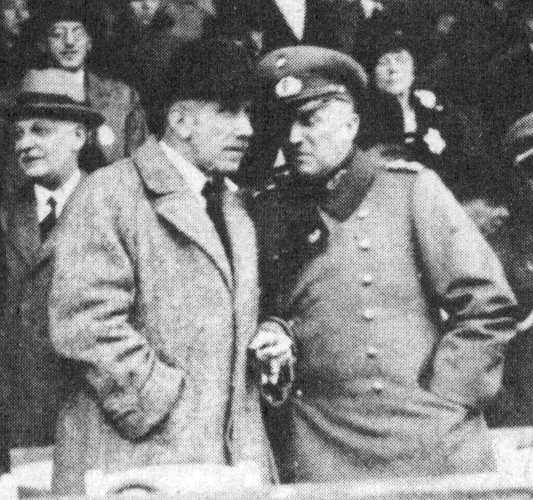
Chancellor Franz von Papen (left) with his eventual successor, the Minister of Defence Kurt von Schleicher

The Centre Party's Heinrich Brüning was Chancellor from 1930 to 1932. Brüning and Hitler were unable to reach terms of co-operation, but Brüning himself increasingly governed with the support of the President and Army over that of the parliament. The 84-year-old President von Hindenburg, a conservative monarchist, was reluctant to take action to suppress the Nazis, while the ambitious Major-General Kurt von Schleicher, as Minister handling army and navy matters hoped to harness their support. With Schleicher's backing, and Hitler's stated approval, Hindenburg appointed the Catholic monarchist Franz von Papen to replace Brüning as Chancellor in June 1932. Papen had been active in the resurgence of the Harzburg Front. He had fallen out with the Centre Party. He hoped ultimately to outmaneuver Hitler.

At the July 1932 federal election, the Nazis became the largest party in the Reichstag, yet without a majority. Hitler withdrew support for Papen and demanded the Chancellorship. He was refused by Hindenburg. Papen dissolved Parliament, and the Nazi vote declined at the November election. In the aftermath of the election, Papen proposed ruling by decree while drafting a new electoral system, with an upper house. Schleicher convinced Hindenburg to sack Papen, and Schleicher himself became Chancellor, promising to form a workable coalition.

The aggrieved Papen opened negotiations with Hitler, proposing a Nazi-DNVP coalition. Having nearly outmaneuvered Hitler, only to be trounced by Schleicher, Papen turned his attentions on defeating Schleicher, and concluded an agreement with Hitler.

== Seizure of control (1931–1933) ==
On 10 March 1931, with street violence between the Rotfront and SA increasing, breaking all previous barriers and expectations, Prussia re-enacted its ban on the Brownshirts. Days after the ban, SA-men shot two communists dead in a street fight, which led to a ban being placed on the public speaking of Goebbels, who sidestepped the prohibition by recording speeches and playing them to an audience in his absence.

When Hitler's citizenship became a matter of public discussion in 1924, he had a public declaration printed on 16 October 1924:

The loss of my Austrian citizenship is not painful to me, as I never felt as an Austrian citizen but always as a German only. ... It was this mentality that made me draw the ultimate conclusion and do military service in the German Army.

Under the threat of criminal deportation to Austria, Hitler formally renounced his Austrian citizenship on 7 April 1925, and did not acquire German citizenship until almost seven years later; therefore, he was unable to run for public office. Hitler gained German citizenship after being appointed a Free State of Brunswick government official by Dietrich Klagges, after an earlier attempt by Wilhelm Frick to convey citizenship as a Thuringian police official failed.

Ernst Röhm, in charge of the SA, put Wolf-Heinrich von Helldorff, a vehement anti-Semite, in charge of the Berlin SA. The deaths mounted, with many more on the Rotfront side, and by the end of 1931 the SA had suffered 47 deaths and the Rotfront recorded losses of approximately 80 killed. Street fights and beer hall battles resulting in deaths occurred throughout February and April 1932, all against the backdrop of Adolf Hitler's competition in the presidential election which pitted him against the monumentally popular Hindenburg. In the first round on 13 March, Hitler had polled over 11 million votes but was still behind Hindenburg. The second and final round took place on 10 April: Hitler (36.8% 13,418,547) lost to Hindenburg (53.0% 19,359,983) while the KPD candidate Thälmann gained a meagre percentage of the vote (10.2% 3,706,759). At this time, the Nazi Party had just over 800,000 members.

On 13 April 1932, following the presidential elections, the German government banned the Nazi Party paramilitaries, the SA and the SS, on the basis of the Emergency Decree for the Preservation of State Authority. This action was prompted by details uncovered by the Prussian police that indicated the SA was ready for a takeover of power by force after an election of Hitler. The lifting of the ban and staging of new elections were the price Hitler demanded in exchange for his support of a new cabinet. The law was repealed on 16 June by Franz von Papen, Chancellor of Germany as part of his agreement with Hitler. In the federal election of July 1932, the Nazis won 37.3% of the popular vote (13,745,000 votes), an upswing by 19 percent, becoming the largest party in the Reichstag, with 230 out of 608 seats. Dwarfed by Hitler's electoral gains, the KPD turned away from legal means and increasingly towards violence. One resulting battle in Silesia resulted in the army being dispatched. By this time both sides marched into each other's strongholds hoping to spark a response. The attacks continued and reached a fever pitch when SA leader Axel Schaffeld was murdered on 1 August.

As the Nazi Party was now the largest party in the Reichstag, they were entitled to select the President of the Reichstag and were able to elect Hermann Göring for the post. Energised by this success, Hitler asked to be made chancellor. He was offered the job of vice-chancellor by Chancellor Papen at the behest of President Hindenburg, but he refused. Hitler saw this offer as placing him in a position of "playing second fiddle" in the government.

In his position of Reichstag president, Göring asked that decisive measures be taken by the government over the spate of murders of Nazi Party members. On 9 August, amendments were made to the Reichstrafgesetzbuch statute on "acts of political violence", increasing the penalty to "lifetime imprisonment, 20 years hard labour[,] or death". Special courts were announced to try such offences. When in power less than half a year later, Hitler would use this legislation against his opponents with devastating effect.

The law was applied almost immediately but did not bring the perpetrators behind the recent massacres to trial as expected. Instead, five SA men who were alleged to have murdered a KPD member in Potempa (Upper Silesia) were tried. Hitler appeared at the trial as a defence witness, but on 22 August the five were convicted and sentenced to death. On appeal, this sentence was commuted to life imprisonment in early September. They served just over four months before Hitler freed all imprisoned Nazis in a 1933 amnesty.

The Nazi Party lost 35 seats in the November 1932 election, but remained the Reichstag's largest party, with 196 seats (33.1%). The Social Democrats (SPD) won 121 seats (20.4%) and the Communists (KPD) won 100 (16.9%).

The Communist International described all moderate left-wing parties as "social fascists" and urged the Communists to devote their energies to the destruction of the moderate left. As a result, the KPD, following orders from Moscow, rejected overtures from the Social Democrats to form a political alliance against the NSDAP.

Inauguration of Hitler as Chancellor
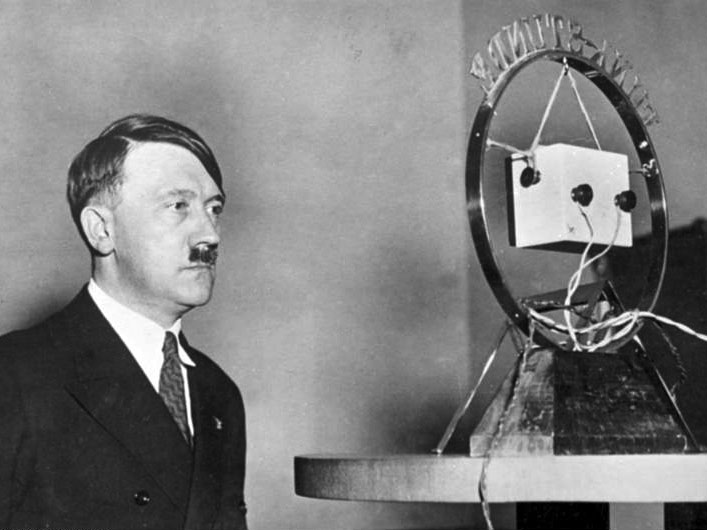
- On 30 January 1933, Reich President Paul von Hindenburg appointed Adolf Hitler as Reich Chancellor. Hitler (pictured) read a message to the German nation on February 1, broadcast on all German radio stations.
- Date: 30 January 1933
- Location: Berlin, Germany
- Participants: Paul von Hindenburg; Adolf Hitler; Hitler cabinet
- Outcome: Hitler became the Reichskanzler of the German Reich

After Chancellor Papen left office, he secretly told Hitler that he still held considerable sway with President Hindenburg and that he would make Hitler chancellor as long as he, Papen, could be the vice chancellor. Another notable event was the publication of the Industrielleneingabe, a letter signed by 22 important representatives of industry, finance and agriculture, asking Hindenburg to appoint Hitler as chancellor. Hindenburg reluctantly agreed to appoint Hitler as chancellor after the parliamentary elections of July and November 1932 had not resulted in the formation of a majority government – despite the fact that Hitler had been Hindenburg's opponent in the presidential election only 9 months earlier. Hitler headed a short-lived coalition government formed by the NSDAP and the German National People's Party (DNVP).

On 30 January 1933, the new cabinet was sworn in during a brief ceremony in Hindenburg's office. The NSDAP gained three posts: Hitler was named chancellor, Wilhelm Frick Minister of the Interior, and Hermann Göring, Minister Without Portfolio (and Minister of the Interior for Prussia). The SA and SS led torchlit parades throughout Berlin. It is this event that would become termed Hitler's Machtergreifung (German pronunciation: [ˈmaxtʔɛɐ̯ˌɡʁaɪ̯fʊŋ]; "seizure of power"). The term was originally used by some Nazis to suggest a revolutionary process, though Hitler, and others, used the word Machtübernahme ("take-over of power"), reflecting that the transfer of power took place within the existing constitutional framework and suggesting that the process was legal.

Papen was to serve as Vice-Chancellor in a majority conservative Cabinet – still falsely believing that he could "tame" Hitler. Initially, Papen did speak out against some Nazi excesses. However, after narrowly escaping death in the Night of the Long Knives in 1934, he no longer dared criticise the regime and was sent off to Vienna as German ambassador.

Both within Germany and abroad, there were initially few fears that Hitler could use his position to establish his later dictatorial single-party regime. Rather, the conservatives that helped to make him chancellor were convinced that they could control Hitler and "tame" the Nazi Party while setting the relevant impulses in the government themselves; foreign ambassadors played down worries by emphasizing that Hitler was a "mediocre" if not a "bad" copy of Mussolini; even SPD politician Kurt Schumacher trivialized Hitler as a Dekorationsstück ("piece of scenery/decoration") of the new government. German newspapers wrote that, without doubt, the Hitler-led government would try to fight its political enemies (the left-wing parties), but that it would be impossible to establish a dictatorship in Germany because there was "a barrier, over which violence cannot proceed" and because of the German nation being proud of "the freedom of speech and thought". Benno Reifenberg of the Frankfurter Zeitung wrote:

It is a hopeless misjudgement to think that one could force a dictatorial regime upon the [German] nation. [...] The diversity of the German people calls for democracy.

— Benno Reifenberg

Even within the Jewish German community, in spite of Hitler not hiding his ardent antisemitism, the worries appear to have been limited. In a declaration of 30 January, the steering committee of the central Jewish German organization (Centralverein deutscher Staatsbürger jüdischen Glaubens) wrote that "as a matter of course" the Jewish community faces the new government "with the largest mistrust", but at the same they were convinced that "nobody would dare to touch [their] constitutional rights". The Jewish German newspaper Jüdische Rundschau wrote on 31 Jan:

... that also within the German nation still the forces are active that would turn against a barbarian anti-Jewish policy.

— Jüdische Rundschau, 31 January 1933

However, a growing number of keen observers, like Sir Horace Rumbold, British Ambassador in Berlin, began to revise their opinions. On 22 February 1933, he wrote, "Hitler may be no statesman but he is an uncommonly clever and audacious demagogue and fully alive to every popular instinct", and he informed the Foreign Office that he had no doubt that the Nazis had "come to stay". On receiving the dispatch Robert Vansittart, Permanent Under-Secretary of State for Foreign Affairs, concluded that if Hitler eventually gained the upper hand, "then another European war [was] within measurable distance".

With Germans who opposed Nazism failing to unite against it, Hitler soon moved to consolidate absolute power:

At the risk of appearing to talk nonsense I tell you that the National Socialist movement will go on for 1,000 years! ... Don't forget how people laughed at me 15 years ago when I declared that one day I would govern Germany. They laugh now, just as foolishly, when I declare that I shall remain in power!

— Adolf Hitler to a British correspondent in Berlin, June 1934

== Chancellor to dictator ==
The groundwork for Hitler's dictatorship was laid when the Reichstag was set on fire in February 1933. As Dutch communist Marinus van der Lubbe was found at the scene of the crime, the Nazis blamed the arson on communists and Hitler convinced Hindenburg to pass the Reichstag Fire Decree, which severely curtailed the liberties and rights of German citizens.

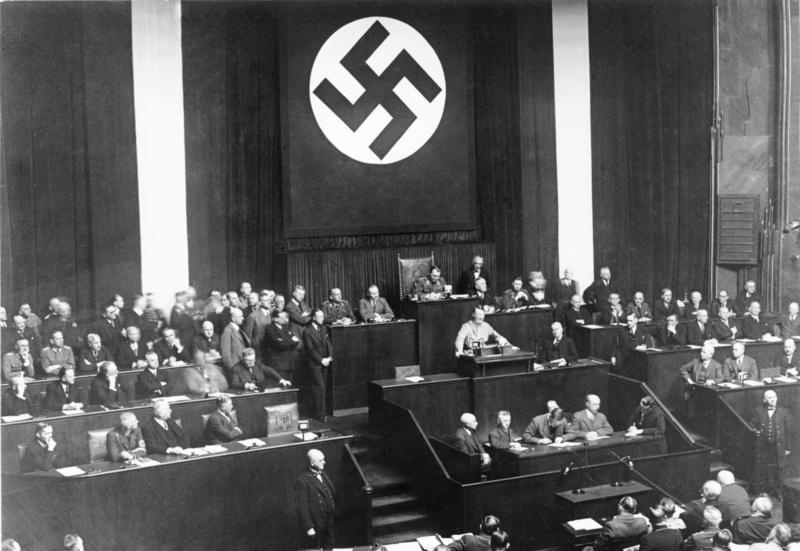
Seeking assent to the Enabling Act, Hitler addressed the Reichstag on 23 March 1933. He requested friendly cooperation, promising not to threaten the Reichstag, the president, the states or the churches if granted the emergency powers.

Chart: political system in Germany after two years of dictatorship

Following the Reichstag fire, the Nazis began to suspend civil liberties and eliminate political opposition. The Communists were excluded from the Reichstag. At the March 1933 elections, again no single party secured a majority. Hitler required the vote of the Centre Party and Conservatives in the Reichstag to obtain the powers he desired. He called on Reichstag members to vote for the Enabling Act on 23 March 1933. Hitler was granted plenary powers "temporarily" by the passage of the Act. The law gave him the freedom to act without parliamentary consent and even without constitutional limitations.

Employing his characteristic mix of negotiation and intimidation, Hitler offered the possibility of friendly co-operation, promising not to threaten the Reichstag, the President, the States or the Churches if granted the emergency powers. With Nazi paramilitary encircling the building, he said: "It is for you, gentlemen of the Reichstag to decide between war and peace". The Centre Party, having obtained promises of non-interference in religion, joined with conservatives in voting for the Act (only the Social Democrats voted against).

The Act allowed Hitler and his Cabinet to rule by emergency decree for four years, though Hindenburg remained President. Hitler immediately set about abolishing the powers of the states and the existence of other political parties and organisations. All other parties were formally outlawed on 14 July 1933, and the Reichstag abdicated its democratic responsibilities. Hindenburg remained commander-in-chief of the military and retained the power to negotiate foreign treaties.

The Act did not infringe upon the powers of the President, and Hitler would not fully achieve full dictatorial power until after the death of Hindenburg in August 1934. Journalists and diplomats wondered whether Hitler could appoint himself President, who might succeed him as Chancellor, and what the army would do. They did not know that the army supported Hitler after the Night of the Long Knives or expect that he would combine the two positions of President and Chancellor into one office with the "Law Concerning the Head of State of the German Reich". Only Hitler, as head of state, could dismiss Hitler as head of the government. All soldiers took the Hitler Oath on the day of Hindenburg's death, swearing unconditional obedience to Hitler personally, not to the office or nation. A large majority approved of combining the two roles in the person of Hitler through the 1934 German referendum.

== See also ==
- Day of Potsdam
- Early timeline of Nazism
- Gleichschaltung
- Poison Kitchen
- Political views of Adolf Hitler
- Weimar paramilitary groups
- Weimar political parties
