= Politischer Arbeiter-Zirkel =

Political activist group founded by Karl Harrer

Political Workers' Circle Politischer Arbeiter-Zirkel
- Leader: Karl Harrer
- Secretary: Michael Lotter
- Founded: March 1918; 108 years ago
- Dissolved: January 5, 1919; 107 years ago
- Merged into: Deutsche Arbeiterpartei
- Headquarters: Munich, Germany
- Ideology: German nationalism Antisemitism; Corporatism; Anti-Marxism
- Political position: Far-right

Politischer Arbeiter-Zirkel (Political Workers' Circle) was a political activist group founded by Karl Harrer, a known nationalist, in hopes of gathering intellectuals to discuss the political future of Germany in March 1918. The organization eventually merged with the Workers' Committee for a Good Peace formed by Anton Drexler to become the German Workers' Party in January 1919. Ultimately these principles would develop into the National Socialist German Workers' Party (Nationalsozialistische Deutsche Arbeiterpartei; NSDAP), also known as the Nazi Party.

== Background ==
Germany's defeat in World War I forced them to take complete responsibility for the war, completely humiliating the German people. Additionally, the stab-in-the-back myth or the idea that Germany was actually winning the war and was undermined by domestic revolutions, emerged and added anger to the equation. The Thule Society, an organization encompassing people from all classes centered around hopes for a counterrevolution, emerged as a result of German humiliation and anger and attempted to fill the gap felt by Germans that the Weimar Republic was “out of touch,” with lower classes.

The society approached Karl Harrer, a member and sports reporter for the right-wing publication Münchner-Augsburger Abendzeitung, to start a political activist group in Munich. The hope was to collect discuss critical German principles, namely nationalism and anti-Semitism.

== Ideology ==
Politischer Arbeiter-Zirkel met periodically for about a year, generally in a small group of three to seven consistent members. Members shared a similar and traditional outlook as highly nationalist, anti-Marxist and anti-Semitic. They also discussed emerging ideas of the time such as Jews as the enemy to Germany, various aspects of the defeat of World War I, and anti-English sentiment, generally thought to be brought on by the Treaty of Versailles. During the meetings Harrer lead the group in studying the Russian Revolution in hopes of finding an escape for Germany.

== Future of the Club ==
Anton Drexler met Karl Harrer at a Rightist rally in Wagner Hall in Munich in 1918. Harrer was impressed with Drexler's desire to have citizen representation in the political sphere and Drexler began attending meetings. Drexler was the leader of his own political group known as the Workers' Committee for a Good Peace, consisting mostly of Drexler's railway coworkers. The Workers' Committee was united under beliefs that international capitalists, considered to be Jews, and Marxists were the enemy.

While Harrer believed there was something to be said for keeping the Politischer Arbeiter-Zirkel small and secretive, Drexler wanted to have a bigger audience and work on the spread of his ideals. Drexler wanted to make it a political party. Ultimately, Drexler proposed the creation of the German Workers' Party. With the uniting of the Politischer Arbeiter-Zirkel with the Workers' Committee, the German Workers' Party (Deutsche Arbeiterpartei; DAP) was founded. Besides Drexler and Harrer, founding members included Gottfried Feder and Dietrich Eckart. It met for the first time on January 5, 1919, in the hotel Fürstenfelder Hof in Munich. Drexler's vision for the party increasingly came into conflict with Harrer's. Harrer wished to ensure that an elite 'inner circle' remained in control of the party, while Drexler wanted to expand it into a mass movement. When Adolf Hitler joined the party, Drexler's position was strengthened. Hitler and Drexler worked on a new constitution to marginalise the role of the Politischer Arbeiter-Zirkel. Harrer was outvoted, and resigned from the party. The DAP was renamed the National Socialist German Workers' Party (Nationalsozialistische Deutsche Arbeiterpartei; NSDAP) on February 24, 1920.
