= Sturmlied =

1920s de facto anthem of the Nazi SA

English: Storm Song
- Lyrics: Dietrich Eckart
- Music: Hans Gansser
- Published: 1921
- Succeeded by: Horst-Wessel-Lied

Audio sample
- file; help

The "Sturmlied" ("Storm Song" or "Assault Song") was the de-facto anthem of the SA until it was gradually supplanted by the "Horst-Wessel-Lied".

== History ==
The lyrics for this song were written by poet Dietrich Eckart, with the second stanza being written in 1919, the third in 1921 and the first in 1923. The stanzas were later rearranged into the now common order. The music was composed by Hans Gansser in 1921, as the poem was also published. The third stanza was usually excluded in the "Sturmlied" as it does not fit in the rhyme scheme of the first two stanzas.

The phrase Deutschland erwache! ("Germany, awake!") was taken from this poem and came to be one of the most influential slogans of the NSDAP.

== Text ==
Sturm! Sturm! Sturm! Sturm! Sturm! Sturm!
Läutet die Glocken von Turm zu Turm!
Läutet, daß Funken zu sprühen beginnen,
Judas erscheint, das Reich zu gewinnen,
Läutet, daß blutig die Seile sich röten,
Rings lauter Brennen und Martern und Töten,
Läutet Sturm, daß die Erde sich bäumt
Unter dem Donner der rettenden Rache!
Wehe dem Volk, das heute noch träumt!
Deutschland, erwache! Erwache!

Sturm! Sturm! Sturm! Sturm! Sturm! Sturm!
Läutet die Glocken von Turm zu Turm,
Läutet die Männer, die Greise, die Buben,
Läutet die Schläfer, aus ihren Stuben,
Läutet die Mädchen herunter die Stiegen,
Läutet die Mütter hinweg von den Wiegen.
Dröhnen soll sie und gellen die Luft,
Rasen, rasen im Donner der Rache,
Läutet die Toten aus ihrer Gruft!
Deutschland, erwache! Erwache!

Sturm! Sturm! Sturm! Sturm! Sturm! Sturm!
Läutet die Glocken von Turm zu Turm,
Los ist die Schlange, der Höllenwurm!
Torheit und Lüge zerbrach seine Kette,
Gier nach dem Gold im scheußlichen Bette!
Rot wie von Blut stehet der Himmel in Flammen,
Schauerlich krachen die Giebel zusammen.
Schlag auf Schlag, die Kapelle, auf sie!
Heulend peitscht sie in Trümmer der Drache!
Läutet zum Sturme jetzt oder nie!
Deutschland, erwache! Erwache!

Storm! Storm! Storm! Storm! Storm! Storm!
Ring the bells from tower to tower!
Ring until sparks begin to fly,
Judas appears to win the Reich,
Ring until the ropes turn red from blood,
With only burning, torture and murder around,
Ring the storm until the earth rises,
Under the thunder of liberating vengeance!
Woe to the people that is still dreaming today!
Germany, awake! Awake!

Storm! Storm! Storm! Storm! Storm! Storm!
Ring the bells from tower to tower!
Ring the men, the old and the young,
Ring the sleepers out of their parlours,
Ring the girls down the stairs,
Ring the mothers away from the cradles!
The air shall clang and cannonade,
Rushing forth in the thunder of vengeance!
Ring the dead out of their grave!
Germany, awake! Awake!

Storm! Storm! Storm! Storm! Storm! Storm!
Ring the bells from tower to tower!
The serpent is let loose, the worm of hell!
Folly and lie has broken its chain,
Greed for gold in the hideous bed!
Bloody red the sky stands in flames,
Gruesomely the gables crash together,
Blow for blow on the chapel they crash!
Blustering the dragon smashes it to pieces!
Call the storm, now or never!
Germany, awake! Awake!
