= Karl Harrer =

German journalist and politician

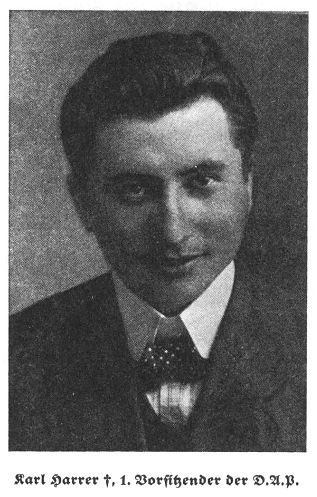

Reich Chairman of the DAP
- In office 5 January 1919 – 24 February 1920
- Leader: Anton Drexler

Personal details
- Born: 8 October 1890 Beilngries, Bavaria, German Empire
- Died: 5 September 1926 (aged 35) Munich, Bavaria, Weimar Republic
- Party: DAP
- Occupation: Journalist

Karl Harrer (8 October 1890 – 5 September 1926) was a German journalist and politician, one of the founding members of the German Workers' Party (DAP) in January 1919, the predecessor to the Nationalsozialistische Deutsche Arbeiterpartei ('National Socialist German Workers' Party', abbreviated to NSDAP), more commonly known as the Nazi Party.

== Biography ==
Harrer was commissioned by the Thule Society to try to politically influence German workers in Munich after the end of World War I. At the time, Harrer was a reporter with a right-wing newspaper. Harrer convinced Anton Drexler and several others to form the Politischer Arbeiterzirkel ('Political Workers' Circle') in 1918. The members met periodically for discussions with themes of nationalism and racism directed against the Jews. Although Harrer preferred that the small group remain a semi-secret nationalistic club, Drexler wanted to make it a political party. Thereafter, Drexler proposed the founding of the DAP in December 1918. On 5 January 1919, the DAP was formed in which not only Harrer and Drexler, but also Gottfried Feder and Dietrich Eckart were involved. With the DAP founding, Drexler was elected chairman and Harrer was made Reich Chairman, an honorary title.

Harrer became increasingly unhappy with the direction in which the party was going after Adolf Hitler became an influential member within it. Early in 1920, Hitler moved to sever the party's link with the Thule Society and to redefine the policies of the DAP. On 24 February 1920 in the Staatliches Hofbräuhaus in München, Hitler for the first time enunciated the twenty-five points of the German Worker's Party's manifesto that had been drawn up by Drexler, Feder and Hitler. In addition, to increase its appeal to larger segments of the population, the DAP changed its name to the Nationalsozialistische Deutsche Arbeiterpartei ('National Socialist German Workers' Party' or 'Nazi Party'). Such was the significance of the move in expanding the party's public profile that Harrer resigned from the party in disagreement as he had always believed that it should be a semi-secret elite group rather than a mass popular movement. The Thule Society subsequently fell into decline and was dissolved about five years later, well before Hitler came to power.

Harrer died in 1926 in Munich.

== See also ==
- Nazism
- Weimar Republic
