= National Socialist Program =

Party program of the Nazi Party

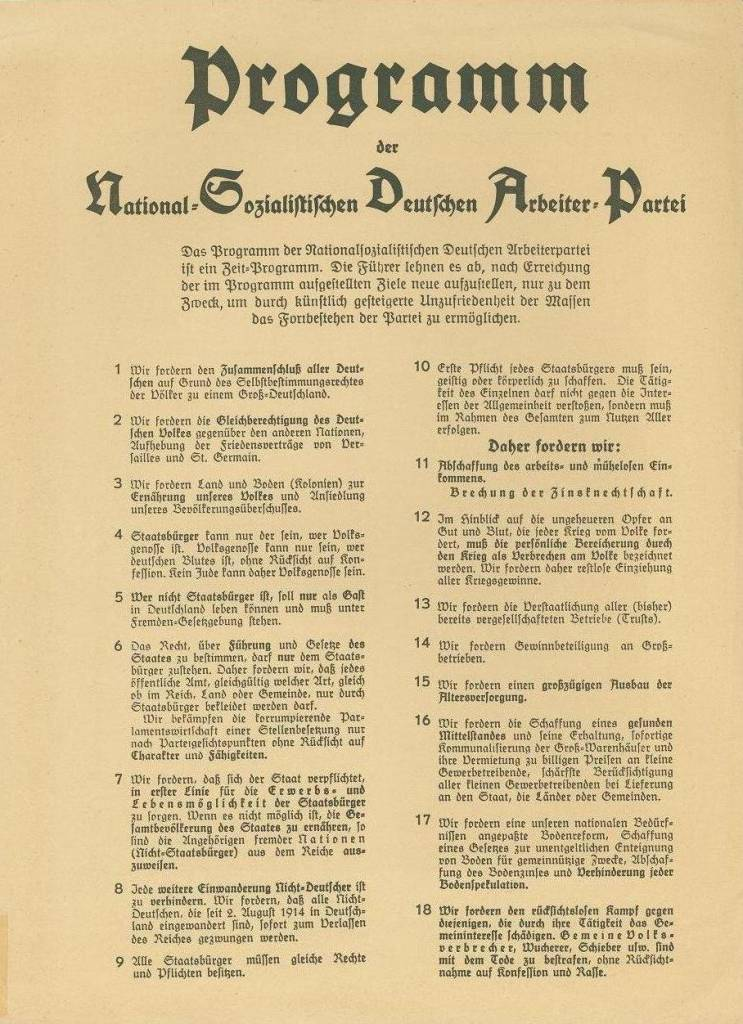
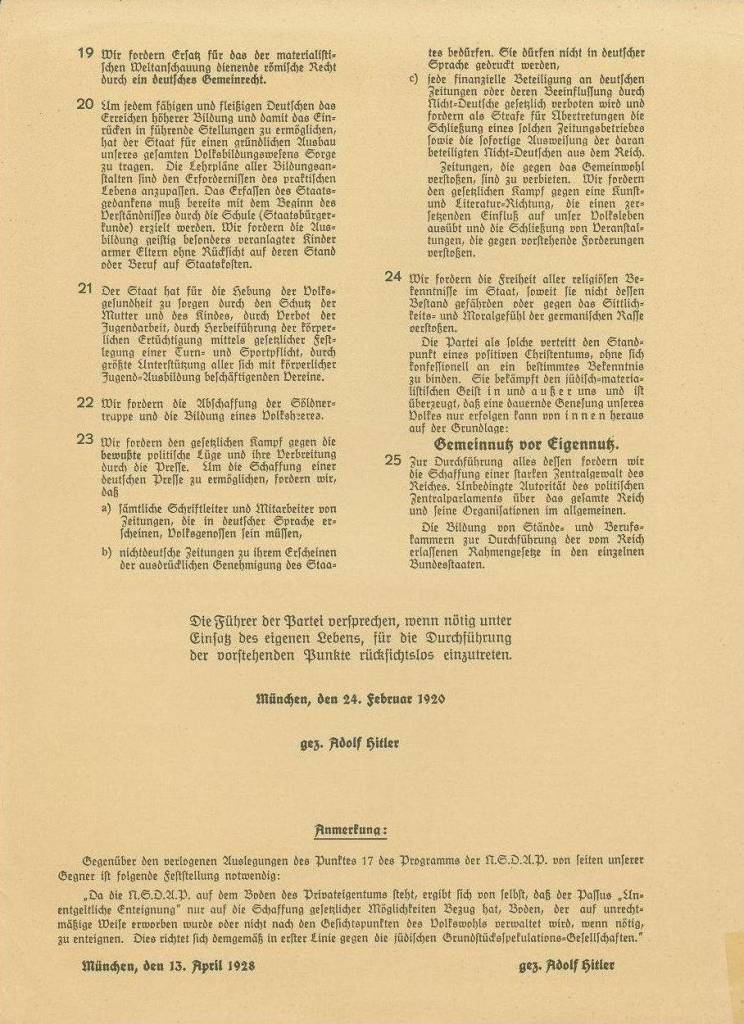
Complete Party Program

The National Socialist Program, also known as the Nazi Party Program, the 25-point Program or the 25-point Plan (German: 25-Punkte-Programm), was the party program of the National Socialist German Workers' Party (NSDAP). Adolf Hitler announced the party's program on 24 February 1920 before approximately 2,000 people in the Munich Festival of the Hofbräuhaus. The National Socialist Program originated at a DAP congress in Vienna, then was taken to Munich by the civil engineer and theorist Rudolf Jung, who having explicitly supported Hitler had been expelled from Czechoslovakia because of his political agitation.

According to the United States Holocaust Memorial Museum, the 25-point program "remained the party's official statement of goals, though in later years many points were ignored".

== History ==
In Munich, on 24 February 1920, Adolf Hitler publicly proclaimed the 25-point Program, when the party was still known as the DAP (German Workers' Party). They retained the National Socialist Program upon renaming themselves as the National Socialist German Workers Party (NSDAP) in February 1920 and it remained the Party's official program. The 25-point Program was a German adaptation — by Hitler, Anton Drexler, Gottfried Feder and Dietrich Eckart — of Rudolf Jung's Austro–Bohemian program. Unlike the Austrians, the Germans did not claim to be either liberal or democratic and opposed neither political reaction nor the aristocracy, yet advocated democratic institutions (i.e. the German central parliament) and voting rights solely for Germans — implying that a Nazi government would retain popular suffrage.

In the course of pursuing public office, the agrarian failures of the 1920s prompted Hitler to explain further the "true" meaning of Point 17 (land reform, legal land expropriation for public utility, abolishment of the land value tax and proscription of land speculation), in the hope of winning the farmers' votes in the May 1928 elections. Hitler disguised the implicit contradictions of Point 17 of the National Socialist Program by explaining that "gratuitous expropriation concerns only the creation of legal opportunities, to expropriate, if necessary, land which has been illegally acquired or is not administered from the viewpoint of the national welfare. This is directed primarily against the Jewish land-speculation companies".

Throughout the 1920s, other members of the NSDAP, seeking ideological consistency, sought either to change or to replace the National Socialist Program. In 1923, the economist Gottfried Feder proposed a 39-point program retaining some original policies and introducing new policies. Hitler suppressed every instance of programmatic change by refusing to broach the matters after 1925, because the National Socialist Program was "inviolable", hence immutable.

== Interpretation ==
The Austrian monarchist Erik von Kuehnelt-Leddihn proposed that the 25-point Program was pro-labour: "[T]he program championed the right to employment, and called for the institution of profit sharing, confiscation of war profits, prosecution of usurers and profiteers, nationalization of trusts, communalization of department stores, extension of the old-age pension system, creation of a national education program of all classes, prohibition of child labour, and an end to the dominance of investment capital". Whereas historian William Brustein proposes that said program points and party founder Drexler's statements indicate that the Nazi Party (NSDAP) originated as a working-class political party.

Historian Karl Dietrich Bracher writes that to Hitler, the program was "little more than an effective, persuasive propaganda weapon for mobilizing and manipulating the masses. Once it had brought him to power, it became pure decoration: 'unalterable,' yet unrealized in its demands for nationalization and expropriation, land reform and 'breaking the shackles of finance capital.' Yet it nonetheless fulfilled its role as backdrop and pseudo-theory, against which the future dictator could unfold his rhetorical and dramatic talents." He summarizes the program by saying that its components were "hardly new" and that "German, Austrian and Bohemian proponents of anti-capitalist, nationalist-imperialist, anti-Semitic movements were resorted to in its compilation"; that a call to "breaking the shackles of finance capital" was added in deference to the idee fixe of Gottfried Feder, one of the party's founding members; and that Hitler provided the militancy of the stance against the Treaty of Versailles and the insistence that the points could not be changed and were to be the permanent foundation of the party. Bracher characterizes the points as being "phrased like slogans; they lent themselves to the concise sensational dissemination of the 'anti' position on which the party thrived. ... Ideologically speaking, [the program] was a wooly, eclectic mixture of political, social, racist, national-imperialist wishful thinking..."

== English translation ==
The program of the National‑Socialist German Workers’ Party is a schedule. The leaders refuse to draft new goals after the ones listed in the program are achieved, solely for the purpose of enabling the party to continue to exist by artificially increasing the dissatisfaction of the masses.

1. We demand the union of all Germans to form a Greater Germany on the basis of the people’s right to self-determination.
2. We demand equality of rights for the German people with other nations; and abolition of the peace treaties of Versailles and St. Germain.
3. We demand land and soil (colonies) for the sustenance of our people and settlement of our surplus population.
4. None but members of the Volk (a people; large tribe) may be citizens of the state. None but those of German blood, whatever their creed, may be members of the Volk. No Jew, therefore, may be a member of the Volk.
5. Whoever has no citizenship is to be able to live in Germany only as a guest and must be regarded as being subject to laws on aliens.
6. The right of voting on the state's government and legislation is to be enjoyed by the citizen of the state alone. We demand therefore that all official appointments, of whatever kind, shall be granted to citizens of the state alone. We oppose the corrupting custom of parliament of filling posts merely with a view to party considerations, and without reference to character or capability.
7. We demand that the state commit itself to providing, first and foremost, opportunities for its citizens to earn a living and make a life for themselves. If it is not possible to feed the entire population of the state, then members of foreign nations (non-citizens) must be expelled from the Reich.
8. All further immigration of non-Germans must be prevented. We demand that all non-Germans, who have immigrated to Germany since 2 August 1914, be forced immediately to leave the Reich.
9. All citizens must have equal rights and obligations.
10. The first obligation of every citizen must be to work, either mentally or physically. The activities of the individual must not conflict with the interests of the general public, but must be carried out within the framework of the whole and for the benefit of all. We therefore demand:
11. Abolition of work-free and effortless income. Breaking of interest-slavery.
12. In consideration of the monstrous sacrifice of life and property that each war demands of the people, personal enrichment due to a war must be regarded as a crime against the people. Therefore, we demand ruthless confiscation of all war profits.
13. We demand nationalization of all businesses which have been up to the present formed into companies (trusts).
14. We demand that the profits of large companies shall be shared out.
15. We demand an expansion on a large scale of old age welfare.
16. We demand the creation of a healthy middle class and its conservation, immediate communalization of the great warehouses and their being leased at low cost to small firms, the utmost consideration of all small firms in contracts with the state, county or municipality.
17. We demand land reform adapted to our national needs, the creation of a law for the expropriation of land for public purposes without compensation. Abolition of land tax and prevention of all land speculation.
18. We demand struggle without consideration against those whose activity is injurious to the general interest. Common national criminals, usurers, profiteers and so forth are to be punished with death, without consideration of confession or race.
19. We demand the replacement of Roman Law, which serves the materialistic world order, with a German common law.
20. In order to enable every capable and hard-working German to attain higher education and thus enter into leading positions, the state must ensure the thorough expansion of our entire public education system. The curricula of all educational institutions must be adapted to the requirements of practical life. An understanding of the concept of the state must be achieved from the very beginning of schooling (civics). We demand that children of poor parents who are particularly gifted intellectually be educated at the expense of the state, regardless of their parents' social status or occupation.
21. The state must ensure the improvement of public health by protecting mothers and children, by prohibiting juvenile labor, by promoting physical fitness through the legal establishment of compulsory gymnastics and sports, and by providing the greatest possible support to all associations involved in physical education for young people.
22. We demand abolition of the mercenary troops and formation of a national army.
23. We demand legal action against deliberate political lies and their dissemination by the press. In order to enable the creation of a German press, we demand that:
  a. All editors and employees of newspapers published in the German language must be members of the race;
  b. Non-German newspapers be required to have the express permission of the state to be published. They may not be printed in the German language;
  c. Non-Germans are forbidden by law any financial interest in German publications or any influence on them and as punishment for violations the closing of such a publication as well as the immediate expulsion from the Reich of the non-German concerned. Publications which are counter to the common good are to be forbidden. We demand legal prosecution of artistic and literary forms which exert a destructive influence on our national life and the closure of events that violate the above demands.
24. We demand freedom of religion for all religious denominations within the state so long as they do not endanger its existence or oppose the moral senses of the Germanic race. The party as such advocates the standpoint of a positive Christianity without binding itself confessionally to any particular denomination. It combats the Jewish-materialistic spirit within and outside us and is convinced that a lasting recovery of our people can only come about from within, on the basis of:
  Public Interest Over Self-Interest
25. For the execution of all of this we demand the formation of a strong central power in the Reich. Unconditional authority of the central parliament over the whole Reich and its organizations in general. The formation of corporative chambers and professional chambers for the execution of the laws made by the Reich within the various states of the confederation.

The leaders of the party promise to stand up for the execution of the above points ruthlessly, if necessary at the cost of their own lives.

Munich, February 24, 1920 — signed Adolf Hitler.

Note:

In response to the mendacious interpretations of point 17 of the NSDAP program by our opponents, the following statement is necessary:

“Since the NSDAP stands on the principle of private property, it goes without saying that the passage ‘expropriation without compensation’ refers only to the creation of legal possibilities to expropriate land that has been acquired unlawfully or is not managed in accordance with the interests of the people, if necessary. This is therefore directed primarily against Jewish real estate speculation companies.”

Munich, April 13, 1928 — signed Adolf Hitler.

== See also ==
- Fascist Manifesto
- Manifesto of the Fascist Intellectuals
- Nazism
- Strasserism
- Twelve Theses
