= Anton Drexler =

German far-right politician (1884–1942)

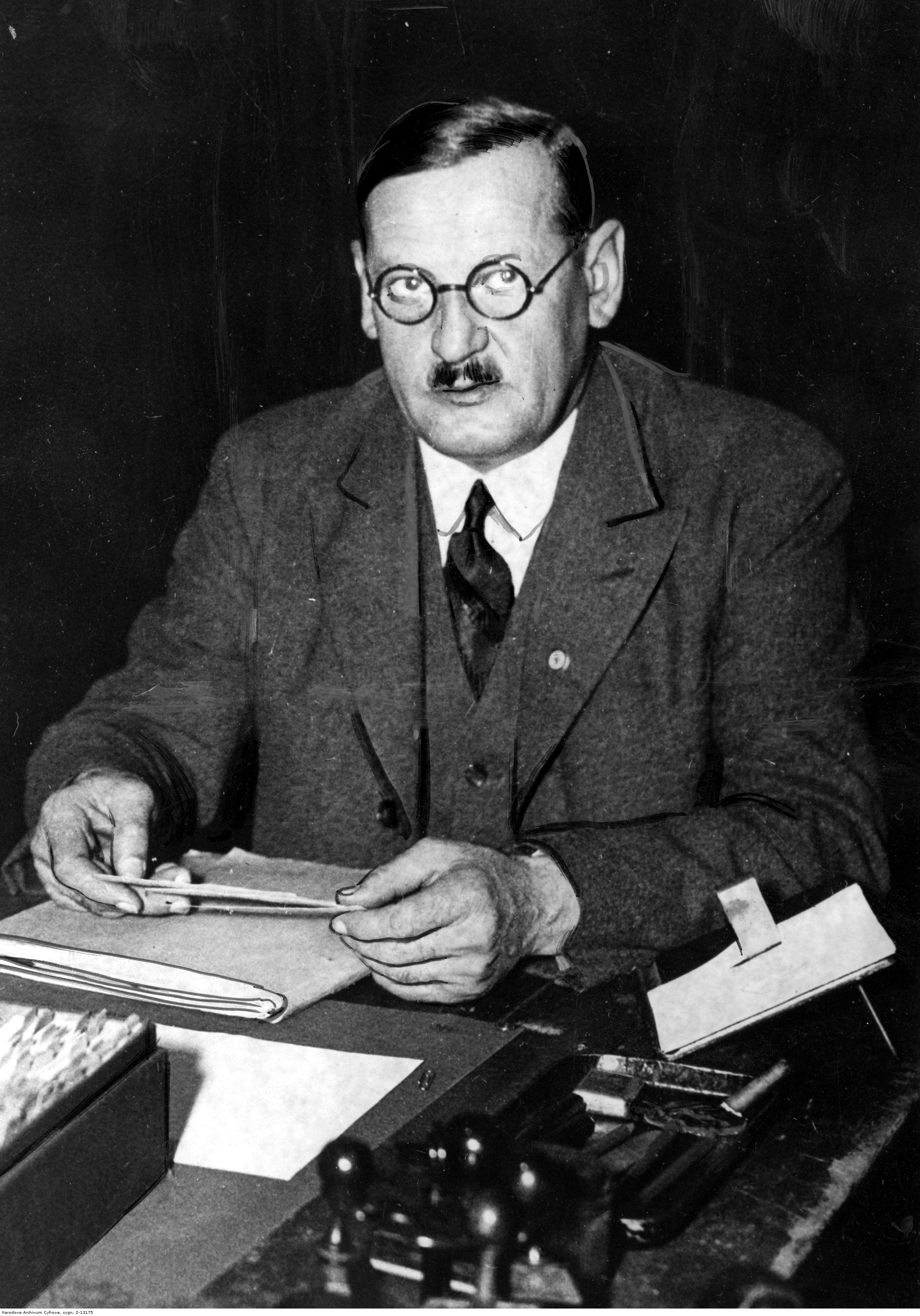
- Drexler in 1920

Chairman of the Nazi Party
- In office 24 February 1920 – 29 July 1921
- Preceded by: Position established
- Succeeded by: Adolf Hitler (as dictatorial Führer of the party)

Chairman of the German Workers' Party
- In office 5 January 1919 – 24 February 1920
- Deputy: Karl Harrer
- Preceded by: Position established
- Succeeded by: Position abolished

Personal details
- Born: 13 June 1884 Munich, German Empire
- Died: 24 February 1942 (aged 57) Munich, Germany
- Party: Nazi Party (1920–1923, 1933–1942)
- Other political affiliations: DVLP (1917–1918); DAP (1919–1920); VSB (1924–1928)
- Occupation: Locksmith; Tool and die maker
- Awards: Blood Order; Golden Party Badge

Anton Drexler (13 June 1884 – 24 February 1942) was a German political agitator for the Völkisch movement in the 1920s. He founded the German Workers' Party (DAP), the pan-German and antisemitic antecedent of the Nazi Party (NSDAP). Drexler mentored his successor in the NSDAP, Adolf Hitler, during his early years in politics. Hitler ousted him as party chair during a power dispute in 1921, ending Drexler's tenure as a Nazi insider and paving the way for Hitler's domination of the party.

== Early life ==
Born in Munich, Drexler was a machine-fitter before becoming a railway toolmaker and locksmith in Berlin. He is believed to have been disappointed with his income, and to have played the zither in restaurants to supplement his earnings. Drexler did not serve in the armed forces during World War I because he was deemed physically unfit for service.

== Politics ==
During World War I, Drexler joined the German Fatherland Party, a short-lived far-right party active during the last phase of the war, which played a significant role in the emergence of the stab-in-the-back myth and the defamation of certain politicians as the "November Criminals".

In March 1918, Drexler founded a branch of the Free Workers' Committee for a Good Peace (Der Freie Arbeiterausschuss für einen guten Frieden) league. Karl Harrer, a journalist and member of the Thule Society, convinced Drexler and several others to form the Political Workers' Circle (Politischer Arbeiter-Zirkel) in 1918. The members met periodically for discussions about nationalism and antisemitism.

=== German Workers' Party ===
Together with Harrer, Drexler founded the German Workers' Party (DAP) in Munich on 5 January 1919. At a DAP meeting in Munich on 12 September 1919, the main speaker was Gottfried Feder, who held a lecture on the subject of 'the breaking of interest slavery'. When Feder's lecture concluded, Adolf Hitler – who attended the meeting as part of his assignment from the German Army to watch political agitators – got involved in a heated political argument with a visitor, Professor Adalbert Baumann, who questioned the soundness of Feder's arguments and in turn spoke in favour of Bavarian separatism. In vehemently attacking the man's arguments, Hitler made an impression on the other party members with his oratorical abilities, and according to him, the professor left the hall defeated. Drexler approached Hitler and gave him a copy of his pamphlet My Political Awakening. Hitler later said the literature reflected the ideals he already held since his own "political awakening". Impressed with Hitler, Drexler encouraged him to join the DAP. On the orders of his army superiors, Hitler applied to join the party.

Once accepted, Hitler began to make the party more public by drawing people in with his speaking abilities, leading up to his organizing the party's biggest meeting yet, which attracted 2,000 people to the Hofbräuhaus in Munich on 24 February 1920. It was in this speech that Hitler, for the first time, enunciated the twenty-five points of the German Worker's Party's manifesto that he had authored with Drexler and Feder. Through these points, he gave the organisation a foreign policy, including the abrogation of the Treaty of Versailles, a Greater Germany, Eastern expansion, and exclusion of Jews from citizenship. On the same day the party was renamed the National Socialist German Workers' Party (Nationalsozialistische Deutsche Arbeiterpartei, NSDAP).

Following an intraparty dispute, Hitler angrily tendered his resignation on 11 July 1921. However, Drexler and the party's governing committee members realised that the resignation of their leading public figure and speaker would mean the end of the party. So Dietrich Eckart was asked by the Party leadership to speak with Hitler and relay the conditions in which he would agree to return. Hitler announced he would rejoin the party on the condition that he would replace Drexler as party chairman, with dictatorial powers and the title of Führer, and that the party headquarters would remain in Munich. The committee agreed and he rejoined the party as member 3,680. Drexler was thereafter moved to the purely symbolic position of honorary president.

Drexler was also a member of a völkisch political club for affluent members of Munich society known as the Thule Society. His membership in the Nazi Party ended when it was temporarily outlawed in 1923 following the Beer Hall Putsch, although Drexler had not taken part in the coup attempt. In 1924, he was elected to the Bavarian state parliament for the Völkisch-Social Bloc party (VSB), in which he served as vice president until 1928. He played no role in the Nazi Party's re-founding in February 1925 and rejoined only after Hitler ascended to national power in 1933. In May 1925, he founded a group with other VSB deputies, the Nationalsozialer Volksbund ('National Social People's League'), but it was dissolved in 1927–1928. Drexler received the Nazi Party's Blood Order in 1934, and was still occasionally used as a propaganda tool until about 1937, but was never allowed any power within the party.

== Death ==
Drexler died in Munich in February 1942 after a lengthy illness due to alcoholism.

== Bibliography ==
- Evans, Richard J. (2003). The Coming of the Third Reich. New York: Penguin Group. ISBN 978-0-14-303469-8.
- Hamilton, Charles (1984). Leaders & Personalities of the Third Reich. Vol. I. R. James Bender Publishing. ISBN 0-912138-27-0.
- Kershaw, Ian (2008). Hitler: A Biography. New York: W. W. Norton & Company. ISBN 978-0-393-06757-6.
- Shirer, William Lawrence (1960), The Rise and Fall of the Third Reich: A History of Nazi Germany, New York City: Simon & Schuster, ASIN B0766DKDLR, LCCN 60006729, OCLC 1286630, OL 5794925M, Wikidata Q138029595
- Wistrich, Robert S. (2002). Who's Who in Nazi Germany. New York, NY: Routledge. ISBN 978-0-4152-6038-1 – via Google Books.
- Zentner, Christian; Bedürftig, Friedemann (1991). The Encyclopedia of the Third Reich. New York: Macmillan. ISBN 0-02-897500-6.

Party political offices
| Preceded by none | Chairman of the DAP; 1919–1921 | Succeeded by Adolf Hitler |
