= Gottfried Feder =

German economist and politician (1883–1941)

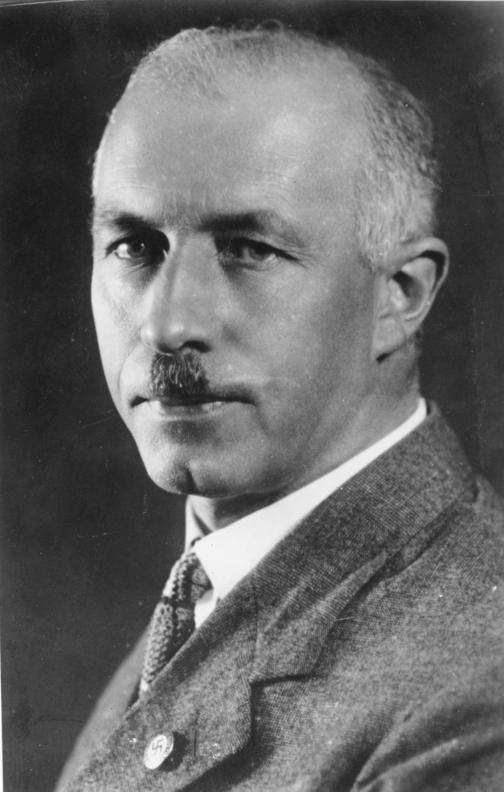
- Feder in 1930
- Born: 27 January 1883; Würzburg, Bavaria, German Empire
- Died: 24 September 1941 (aged 58); Murnau am Staffelsee, Gau Munich-Upper Bavaria, Nazi Germany

Academic background
- Education: Humboldt University of Berlin
- Influences: Silvio Gesell; Rudolf Jung; Othmar Spann; Houston Stewart Chamberlain

Academic work
- Discipline: Urbanism
- School or tradition: Nazism
- Institutions: Technische Universität Berlin
- Notable ideas: Planned community Deep foundation

Gottfried Feder (27 January 1883 – 24 September 1941) was a German civil engineer, a self-taught economist, and one of the early key members of the Nazi Party and its economic theoretician. One of his lectures, delivered on 12 September 1919, drew Adolf Hitler into the party.

== Early life and education ==
Feder was born in Würzburg on 27 January 1883, the son of civil servant Hans Feder and Mathilde Feder (née Luz). After being taught in a humanistic gymnasium in Würzburg, he studied engineering in Berlin and Zürich. He founded a construction company in 1908 that became particularly active in Bulgaria where it built a number of official buildings.

Feder claimed that he studied financial politics and economics on his own from 1917 onward, but there is no evidence to back up this claim. He developed a hostility towards wealthy bankers during World War I and wrote a "manifesto on breaking the shackles of interest", Brechung der Zinsknechtschaft, in 1919. He called for the 1932 NSDAP programme that demanded a nationalisation of all banks and an abolition of interest.

In 1919, Feder, together with Anton Drexler, Dietrich Eckart and Karl Harrer, were involved in the founding of the Deutsche Arbeiterpartei (German Workers' Party-DAP). Adolf Hitler met him in the summer of 1919 while he was in an anti-Bolshevik training course at the Ludwig-Maximilians-Universität München—funded by the army and organized by Major Karl Mayr—and Feder became his mentor in finance and economics. He helped to inspire Hitler's opposition to "Jewish finance capitalism." Delivering political courses alongside Feder was Karl Alexander von Müller (son of Bavaria's Culture Minister) who spotted Hitler's oratorical ability and forwarded his name as a political instructor for the army—an important step in Hitler's career.

Feder agreed with Houston Stewart Chamberlain, claiming that World War I had been long planned by Jews to overthrow Germany's Hohenzollern dynasty and grab power for themselves.

== 1920s politics ==
In February 1920, together with Adolf Hitler and Anton Drexler, Feder drafted the "25 points" which summed up the party's views and introduced his own anti-capitalist views into the program. When the paper was announced on 24 February 1920, more than 2,000 people attended the rally. In an attempt to make the party more broadly appealing to larger segments of the population, the DAP was renamed in February 1920 to the Nationalsozialistische Deutsche Arbeiterpartei (National Socialist German Workers' Party, NSDAP), more commonly known as the Nazi Party.

Feder took part in the party's failed Beer Hall Putsch in November 1923 and survived unhurt. Coincidentally, he already had a visa for a planned visit to the Sudeten German National Socialists, so he fled to Czechoslovakia. A few months later, he was able to safely return to Germany. During Hitler's imprisonment, he remained one of the leaders of the now outlawed NSDAP and was elected to the Reichstag in May 1924 under the banner of the Nazi front organization, the National Socialist Freedom Movement. In May 1928, after the ban on the Nazi Party was lifted, he was elected as one of the first 12 Nazi deputies. He served until March 1936, representing the electoral constituencies of Chemnitz-Zwickau (1924–1932), Leipzig (1932–1933) and East Prussia (1933–1936). As a Reichstag deputy, he demanded the freezing of interest rates and dispossession of Jewish citizens. He remained one of the leaders of the anti-capitalistic wing of the NSDAP, and published several papers, including "National and social bases of the German state" (1920), "Das Programm der NSDAP und seine weltanschaulichen Grundlagen" ("The programme of the NSDAP and its ideological foundations" 1927) and "Was will Adolf Hitler?" ("What does Adolf Hitler want?", 1931).

In early 1926, Feder played a key role in assisting Hitler to overcome the challenge to his authority presented by the National Socialist Working Association. This was a short-lived group of northern and western German Gauleiter, organized in September 1925 and led by Gregor Strasser, which unsuccessfully sought to amend the "25 Points." Around Christmas 1925, Feder obtained a copy of the proposed revision and informed Hitler of it. As a coauthor of the original 1920 program, Feder felt protective of it and was furious that an attempt to amend it was underway without his or Hitler's knowledge. At a meeting of the Working Association in Hanover on 24 January 1926, Feder attended, uninvited but as Hitler's representative. The meeting became contentious with Joseph Goebbels, one of the Working Association leaders, demanding that Feder be ejected, shouting: "We don't want any stool pigeons!" However, a vote was taken and Feder was allowed to participate. The draft program was vigorously debated with Feder raising objections on various points. In the end, the Strasser draft was not approved. Shortly afterward, on 14 February, Hitler called a leadership meeting known as the Bamberg Conference where he forcefully opposed the positions advocated by the Working Association and insisted that the original program be retained intact. Strasser was made to retrieve all copies of the draft program that had been distributed. Hitler reasserted his authority as supreme Party leader and stamped out any potential threat from the Working Association, which faded into irrelevance and was formally dissolved later in the year.

Feder briefly dominated the Nazi Party's official views on financial politics, but after he became chairman of the party's economic council in 1931, his anti-capitalist views led to a great decline in financial support from Germany's major industrialists. Following pressure from Albert Vögler, Gustav Krupp, Friedrich Flick, Fritz Thyssen, Emil Kirdorf and especially Hjalmar Schacht, Hitler decided to move the party away from Feder's economic views. Schacht wrote in the 'Magic of Money' that "National Socialist agitiation under the leadership of Gottfried Feder" aimed to curtail "private banking" and "the entire currency system." He further explained that the goal of Feder and his pupils was to destroy their entire "banking and monetary economy" and concludes that he "had to try to steer Hitler away from these destruction conceptions." (p. 154) When Hitler became Reichskanzler in 1933, he appointed Feder as State Secretary at the Reich Ministry of Economics in July, an appointment that disappointed Feder, who had hoped for a much higher position.

== Nazi Germany ==
Feder continued to write papers, putting out "Kampf gegen die Hochfinanz" ("The Fight against high finance", 1933) and the antisemitic "Die Juden" ("The Jews," 1933). In 1939 he wrote Die Neue Stadt (the New City). This can be considered an attempt at Garden City building through the use of Nazi architecture. Here he proposed creating agricultural cities of 20,000 people divided into nine autonomous units and surrounded by agricultural areas. Each city was to be fully autonomous and self-sufficient, with detailed plans for daily living and urban amenities provided. Unlike other garden city theorists, he believed that urban areas could be reformed by subdividing the existing built environment into self-sufficient neighborhoods. This idea of creating clusters of self-contained neighbourhoods forming a mid-sized city was popularised by Uzō Nishiyama in Japan. It would later be applied in the era of Japanese New Town construction.

However, despite its consistency with the blood and soil ideology of the Nazis, his concept of decentralized factories was successfully opposed by both generals and Junkers. Generals objected because it interfered with rearmament, and Junkers because it would prevent their exploiting their estates for the international market.

When Hjalmar Schacht took office as Minister of Economics on 2 August 1934, one of his first actions was to fire Feder from his State Secretary post. Feder then served as Reichskommissar for Settlement until December 1934. He also was a member of Hans Frank's Academy for German Law. Feder ended up becoming Professor for Settlement Policy at the Technische Hochschule Berlin in December 1936, where he stayed until his death in Murnau, Bavaria, on 24 September 1941.

== Publications by Feder ==
- "Das Manifest zur Brechung der Zinsknechtschaft des Geldes" in Kritische Rundschau (1919) (The Manifesto for Breaking the Interest Bondage of Money in Critical Review).
  - Expanded New Edition in An Alle, Alle! Number 1 (1919).
- "Der Staatsbankrott die Rettung" in An Alle, Alle! Number 2 (1919) ("The State Bankruptcy the Rescue").
- Das Programm der N.S.D.A.P. und seine weltanschaulichen Grundgedanken (The program of the NSDAP and its ideological principles).
- Die Wohnungsnot und die soziale Bau- und Wirtschaftsbank als Retterin aus Wohnungselend, Wirtschaftskrise und Erwerbselend (The housing shortage and the social construction and business bank as a rescuer from the misery of the home, the economic crisis and the economic crisis).
- Der Deutsche Staat auf nationaler und sozialer Grundlage (1923) (The German state on a national and social basis).
- Was will Adolf Hitler? (1931) (What does Adolf Hitler want?).
- Kampf gegen die Hochfinanz (1933) (Fight against high finance).
- Die organische Volkswirtschaft (1934) (The organic economy).[17]
- Der ständische Gedanke im Nationalsozialismus (The concept of class in National Socialism).
- Grundriß einer nationalsozialistischen Volkswirtschaftstheorie (Floor plan of a National Socialist economic theory).
- with Ferdinand Werner, Ernst Graf zu Reventlow and others: Das neue Deutschland und die Judenfrage. Diskussionsbeitrag (The new Germany and the Jewish question. Discussion contribution). Rüdiger (C. E. Krug), Leipzig 1933 (original title: Der Jud ist schuld (The Jew is to blame)).
- Die Juden (The Jews). Central Publisher of the NSDAP, Frz. Rather Nachf., Munich 1933.
- Gewerkschaften, DAF und der Wert des Arbeit (Trade unions, DAF and the value of labor), 1934.
- Die neue Stadt. Versuch der Begründung einer neuen Stadtplanungskunst aus der sozialen Struktur der Bevölkerung (The new city. Attempt to establish a new urban planning art from the social structure of the population). Published by Julius Springer, Berlin 1939.

== See also ==
- Social credit
