= German Workers' Party =

Predecessor of the Nazi Party (1919–1920)

German Workers' Party Deutsche Arbeiterpartei
- Abbreviation: DAP
- Chairman: Anton Drexler
- Deputy Chairman: Karl Harrer
- Founders: Anton Drexler (Note: Served as Chairman of the German Workers' Party from 5 January 1919 to 24 February 1920.); Dietrich Eckart; Gottfried Feder; Karl Harrer (Note: Served as Deputy Chairman of the German Workers' Party from 5 January 1919 to 24 February 1920.)
- Founded: 5 January 1919
- Dissolved: 24 February 1920
- Merger of: Political Workers' Circle; Free Workers' Committee for a Good Peace
- Succeeded by: National Socialist German Workers' Party (NSDAP)
- Headquarters: Fürstenfelder Straße 14, Munich, Germany
- Membership: 555 (claimed); 55 (actual) January 1920
- Ideology: Pan-Germanism; Anti-Marxism; Anti-capitalism; Antisemitism; Völkisch nationalism
- Political position: Far-right

The German Workers' Party (German: Deutsche Arbeiterpartei, DAP) was an obscure far-right political party established in the Weimar Republic after World War I. It lasted from 5 January 1919 until 24 February 1920. The DAP was the precursor of the National Socialist German Workers' Party (German: Nationalsozialistische Deutsche Arbeiterpartei, NSDAP), commonly known as the Nazi Party.

== History ==
=== Origins ===
On 5 January 1919, the German Workers' Party (DAP) was founded in Munich in the hotel Fürstenfelder Hof by Anton Drexler, along with Dietrich Eckart, Gottfried Feder and Karl Harrer. It developed out of the Freien Arbeiterausschuss für einen guten Frieden ('Free Workers' Committee for a Good Peace') league, a branch of which Drexler had founded in 1918. Thereafter in 1918, Harrer (a journalist and member of the Thule Society), convinced Drexler and several others to form the Politischer Arbeiterzirkel ('Political Workers' Circle'). The members met periodically for discussions with themes of nationalism and antisemitism. Drexler was encouraged to form the DAP in December 1918 by his mentor, Paul Tafel. Tafel was a leader of the Alldeutscher Verband (Pan-Germanist Union), a director of the Maschinenfabrik Augsburg-Nürnberg and a member of the Thule Society. Drexler wanted a political party which was both in touch with the masses and nationalist. When the DAP was founded in January 1919, Drexler was elected chairman and Harrer was made Reich Chairman, an honorary title. On 17 May, only ten members were present at the meeting, and a later meeting in August only noted 38 members attending. The members were mainly Drexler's colleagues from the Munich railway yards.

=== Adolf Hitler's membership ===
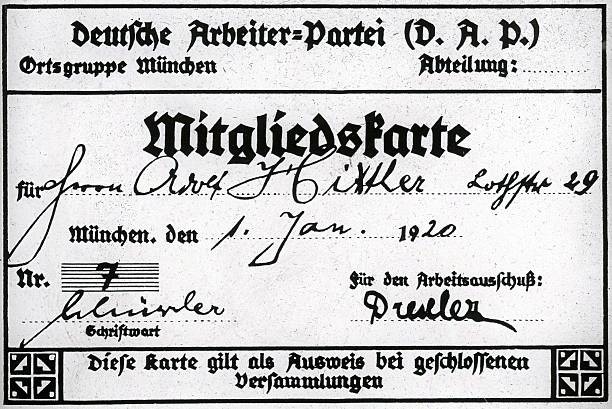
Adolf Hitler's DAP card with the membership number 7 (altered from the original)

After World War I ended, Adolf Hitler returned to Munich. Having no formal education or career prospects, he tried to remain in the army for as long as possible. In July 1919, he was appointed Verbindungsmann ('intelligence agent') of an Aufklärungskommando ('reconnaissance commando') of the Reichswehr to influence other soldiers and to investigate the DAP. While Hitler was initially unimpressed by the meetings and found them disorganised, he enjoyed the discussion that took place. During these investigations, Hitler became attracted to founder Anton Drexler's antisemitic, nationalist, anti-capitalist, and anti-Marxist ideas. While attending a party meeting at the Sterneckerbräu beer hall on 12 September 1919, Hitler became involved in a heated political argument with a visitor, Professor Adalbert Baumann, who questioned the soundness of Gottfried Feder's arguments in support of Bavarian separatism and against capitalism. In vehemently attacking the man's arguments, he made an impression on the other party members with his oratory skills and, according to Hitler, Baumann left the hall acknowledging unequivocal defeat. Impressed with Hitler's oratory skills, Drexler encouraged him to join. On the orders of his army superiors, Hitler applied to join the party. Although Hitler initially wanted to form his own party, he claimed to have been convinced to join the DAP because it was small and he could eventually become its leader. He consequently encouraged the organisation to become less of a debating society, which it had been previously, and more of an active political party.

In less than a week, Hitler received a postcard stating he had officially been accepted as a member and he should come to a committee meeting to discuss it. Hitler attended the committee meeting held at the run-down Altes Rosenbad beer-house. Normally, enlisted army personnel were not allowed to join political parties. In this case, Hitler had Captain Karl Mayr's permission to join the DAP. Further, Hitler was allowed to stay in the army and receive his weekly pay of 20 gold marks. Unlike many other members of the organisation, this continued employment provided him with enough money to dedicate himself more fully to the DAP. At the time when Hitler joined the party, there were no membership numbers or cards. It was in January 1920 when a numeration was issued for the first time and listed in alphabetical order that Hitler received the number 555. In reality, he had been the 55th member, but the counting started at the number 501 in order to make the party appear larger. In his work Mein Kampf, Hitler later claimed to be the seventh party member, but he was in fact the seventh executive member of the party's central committee.

During 1919, the DAP set out an explicit program of being nationalistic, antisemitic, and anti-Marxist. Unlike other similar nationalist parties at the time, the DAP aimed its rhetoric towards working class Germans, hoping to cross class boundaries and recruit them. However, Hitler explicitly rejected the Marxist idea of dictatorship of the proletariat, and instead attempted to appeal to the working class to create a Volksgemeinschaft, where German identity took precedence over class, religion, or other ideas.

After giving his first speech for the DAP on 16 October at the Hofbräukeller, Hitler quickly became the party's most active orator. Hitler's considerable oratory and propaganda skills were appreciated by the party leadership as crowds began to flock to hear his speeches during 1919–1920. Such was the popularity of Hitler's speaking skills, the party began charging an entry fee for visitors to hear his speeches. With the support of Drexler, Hitler became chief of propaganda for the party in early 1920. Hitler preferred that role as he saw himself as the drummer for a national cause. He saw propaganda as the way to bring nationalism to the public.

=== From DAP to NSDAP ===
The small number of party members were quickly won over to Hitler's political beliefs. He organized their biggest meeting yet of 2,000 people on 24 February 1920 in the Staatliches Hofbräuhaus in München (a beer hall in Munich). Further in an attempt to make the party more broadly appealing to larger segments of the population, the DAP was renamed the National Socialist German Workers' Party (NSDAP) on 24 February. Such was the significance of Hitler's particular move in publicity that Harrer resigned from the party in disagreement. The new name was borrowed from a different Austrian party active at the time (the Deutsche Nationalsozialistische Arbeiterpartei; the German National Socialist Workers' Party), although Hitler earlier suggested the party to be renamed the Social Revolutionary Party in order to distance the party from association with socialism. It was Rudolf Jung who persuaded Hitler to adopt the NSDAP name. The name was intended to draw upon both left-wing and right-wing ideals, with "Socialist" and "Workers'" appealing to the left, and "National" and "German" appealing to the right.

Although the German Folkish Party (Deutschvölkische Partei), an ideological precursor of the Nazi party, started using the swastika for its party publication in January 1917, only after renaming the DAP was the swastika adopted as the symbol of the Nazi party in August 1920.

== Membership ==
Early members of the party included:

- Anton Drexler
- Dietrich Eckart
- Gottfried Feder
- Karl Harrer
- Hermann Esser
- Ernst Boepple
- Hans Frank
- Adolf Hitler
- Rudolf Hess
- Ernst Röhm
- Alfred Rosenberg
- Rudolf Jung
