= Dietrich Eckart =

German writer (1868–1923)

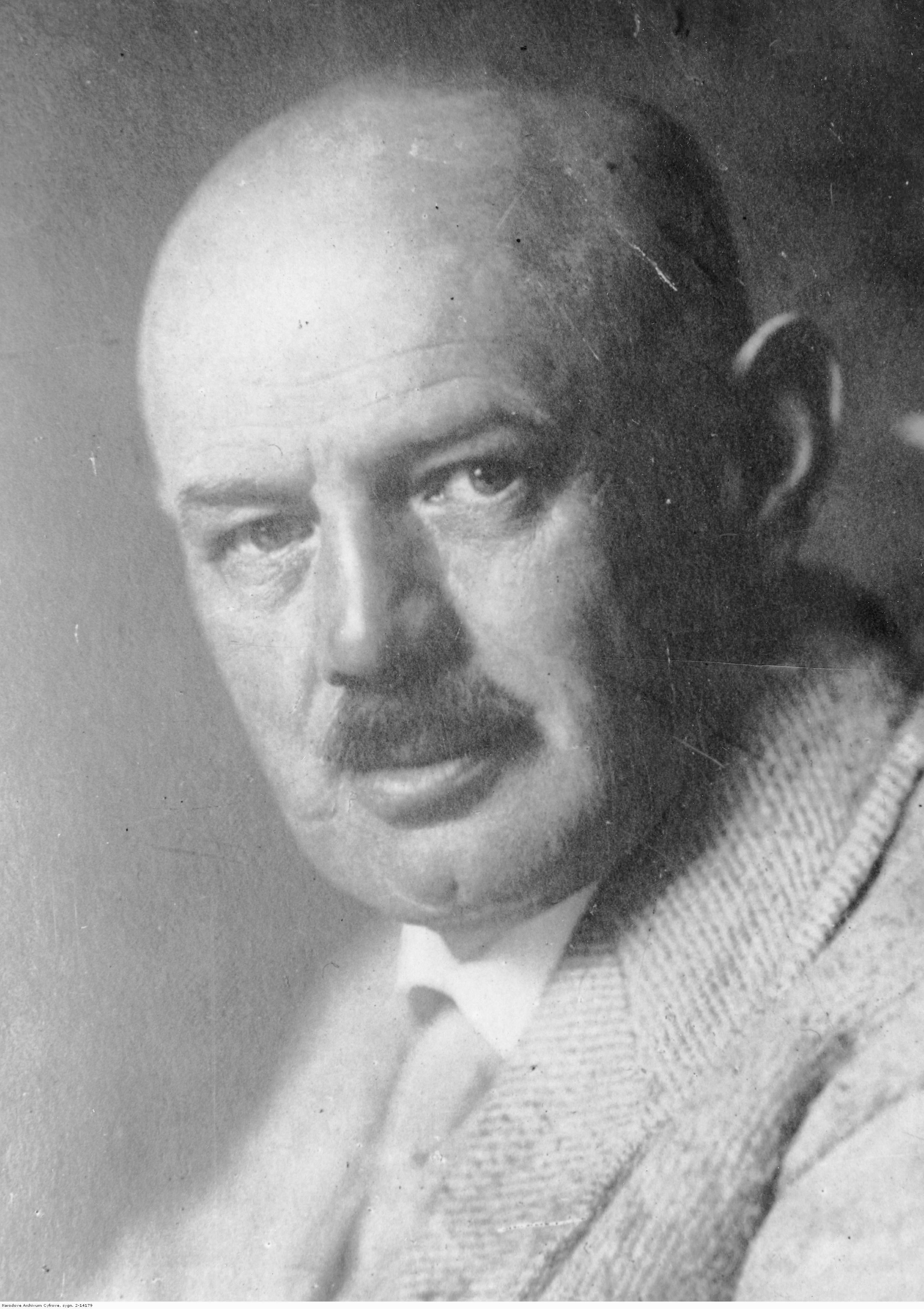
- Born: 23 March 1868; Neumarkt, Kingdom of Bavaria
- Died: 26 December 1923 (aged 55); Berchtesgaden, Bavaria, Weimar Germany
- Spouse: Rose Marx (née Wiedeburg) (m. 1913; div. 1921)

Dietrich Eckart (German: [ˈɛkaʁt]; 23 March 1868 – 26 December 1923) was a German völkisch poet, playwright, journalist, publicist, and political activist who was one of the founders of the German Workers' Party (DAP), the precursor of the Nazi Party (National Socialist German Workers' Party or NSDAP). Eckart was a key influence on Adolf Hitler in the early years of the Party, the original publisher of the party newspaper, the Völkischer Beobachter ("Folkist Observer"), and the lyricist of the first party anthem, "Sturmlied" ("Storming Song"). He was a participant in the failed Beer Hall Putsch in 1923 and died on 26 December of that year, shortly after his release from Landsberg Prison, of a heart attack.

Eckart was elevated to the status of a major thinker upon the establishment of Nazi Germany in 1933. He was acknowledged by Hitler to be the spiritual co-founder of Nazism and "a guiding light of the early National Socialist movement."

== Early life ==
Eckart was born on 23 March 1868 in Neumarkt, about 32 kilometres (20 mi) southeast of Nuremberg in the Kingdom of Bavaria, the son of Christian Eckart, a royal notary and lawyer, and his wife Anna, a devout Catholic. Eckart's mother died when he was ten years old and he was expelled from several schools. In 1895, his father died, leaving him a considerable amount of money that Eckart soon spent.

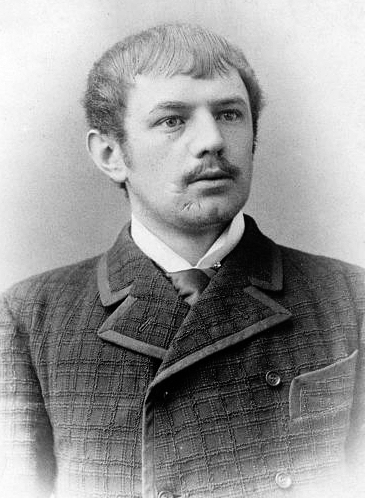
Eckart as a young man

Eckart initially studied law at Erlangen, later medicine at the Ludwig-Maximilians-Universität München, and was an eager member of the fencing and drinking Student Korps. He decided in 1891 to become a poet, playwright, and journalist. Diagnosed with morphine addiction and nearly stranded, he moved to Berlin in 1899. There he wrote a number of plays, often autobiographical, and became the protégé of Count Georg von Hülsen-Haeseler (1858–1922), the artistic director of the Prussian Royal Theatre. After a duel, Eckart was incarcerated at the Passau Oberhaus.

As a playwright Eckart had success with his 1912 adaptation of Henrik Ibsen's Peer Gynt, which played for more than 600 performances in Berlin alone. Although Eckart never had another theatrical success like Peer Gynt, and blamed his numerous failures on the influence of Jews in German culture, that one play not only made him wealthy, it gave him the social contacts that he later used to introduce Hitler to dozens of important German citizens. These introductions proved to be pivotal in Hitler's rise to power. Later on, Eckart developed an ideology of a "genius superman", based on writings by the Völkisch author Jörg Lanz von Liebenfels and by philosopher Otto Weininger. Eckart saw himself following the tradition of Heinrich Heine, Arthur Schopenhauer and Angelus Silesius. He also became fascinated by the Buddhist doctrine of Maya, or illusion.

From 1907, Eckart lived with his brother Wilhelm in the Döberitz mansion colony west of the Berlin city limits. In 1913 he married Rose Marx, an affluent widow from Bad Blankenburg, and returned to Munich.

== Eckart's adaptation of Peer Gynt ==
In Eckart's five-act version of Ibsen's piece, the play became "a powerful dramatisation of nationalist and antisemitic ideas", in which Gynt represents the superior Germanic hero, struggling against implicitly Jewish "trolls". In Ibsen's original play, Peer Gynt leaves Norway to become the "king of the world", but through his selfish and deceptive actions his body and soul are ruined, and he returns to his native village in shame. Eckart, however, sees Gynt as a hero who challenges the trollish, i.e. Jewish, world. His transgressions are therefore noble, and Gynt returns to reclaim the innocence of his youth. This conception of the character was influenced by Eckart's hero, Otto Weininger, who led him to see Gynt as an antisemitic genius. In this racial allegory, the trolls and Dovregubben ("Dovre Giant") represent Weininger's concept of "Jewishness".

Eckart later wrote to Hitler—in a copy of the play he presented to him shortly after Hitler became the Nazi Party Fuhrer—that "[Gynt's] idea of becoming the king of the world should not be taken literally as the 'Will to Power'. Hidden behind this is a spiritual belief that he will ultimately be pardoned for all his sins." He counseled Hitler that in his quest to be the "German Messiah" his ends justified the means he used, so he need not be concerned about employing violence or other transgressions of societal norms because, like Gynt, he would be forgiven for his sins. In his introduction to the play, Eckart wrote "[It is by] German nature, which means, in the broader sense, the capability of self-sacrifice itself, that the world will heal, and find its way back to the pure divine, but only after a bloody war of annihilation against the united army of the 'trolls'; in other words, against the Midgard Serpent encircling the earth, the reptilian incarnation of the lie."

== Antisemitism and foundation of the German Workers' Party (DAP) ==
Eckart was not always an antisemite. In 1898, for instance, Eckart wrote and had published a poem extolling the virtues and beauty of a Jewish girl. Before his conversion to antisemitism, the two people he admired most were the poet Heinrich Heine and Otto Weininger, who were both Jews. Weininger, however, had converted to Protestantism, and has been described as a "self-hating Jew" eventually espousing antisemitic views. Eckart's admiration for Weininger may have played a part in his conversion.

In December 1918, Eckart founded, published and edited the antisemitic weekly Auf gut Deutsch (English: In plain German) – with financial support from the Thule Society – working with Alfred Rosenberg, whom he called his "co-warrior against Jerusalem", and Gottfried Feder. A fierce critic of the German Revolution and the Weimar Republic, he vehemently opposed the Treaty of Versailles, which he viewed as treason, and was a proponent of the so-called stab-in-the-back legend (Dolchstoßlegende), according to which the Social Democrats and Jews were to blame for Germany's defeat in the war.

In 1919, Eckart became a member of the Deutschvölkischer Schutz- und Trutzbund, the largest and most active antisemitic organization in Germany. Eckart's antisemitism was influenced by the publication The Protocols of the Elders of Zion, which had been brought to Germany by "white Russian" emigrés fleeing the October Revolution. The book purported to outline the international Jewish conspiracy for control of the world, and many right-wing and völkisch political figures believed it to be a true account.

After living in Berlin for many years, Eckart moved to Munich in 1913, the same year that Hitler moved there from Vienna. In January 1919, he, Feder, Anton Drexler and Karl Harrer founded the Deutsche Arbeiterpartei (German Workers' Party, or DAP). In order to increase its appeal to larger segments of the population, in February 1920 it changed its name to the Nationalsozialistische Deutsche Arbeiterpartei (National Socialist German Workers' Party, or NSDAP); more commonly known as the Nazi Party. Eckart was largely responsible for the party buying the Münchener Beobachter in December 1920, when he arranged for the loan which paid for it. The 60,000 Marks came from German Army funds available to General Franz Ritter von Epp, and the loan was secured with Eckart's house and possessions as collateral, with Dr. Gottfried Grandel, an Augsburg chemist and factory owner who was Eckart's friend and a funder of the Party, as guarantor. The newspaper was renamed the Völkischer Beobachter and became the party's official organ, with Eckart as its first editor and publisher. He also created the Nazi slogan Deutschland erwache ("Germany awake"), and wrote the lyrics for the anthem based on it, the "Sturm-Lied".

In 1921 Eckart promised 1,000 Marks to everyone who could cite one Jewish family whose sons had served longer than three weeks at the front during the First World War. The Hannover rabbi Samuel Freund named 20 Jewish families who met this condition and sued Eckart when he refused to pay the reward. During the trial, Freund named 50 more Jewish families with up to seven veterans, among whom were several which lost up to three sons in the war. Eckart lost the case and had to pay.

== Eckart and Hitler ==
Eckart was instrumental in creating the persona of Adolf Hitler as one of the future dictator's most important early mentors, and was one of the first propagators of the "Hitler Myth". Their relationship was not simply a political one, as there was a strong emotional and intellectual bond between the two men, described by some as an almost symbiotic relationship. It was Eckart who gave to Hitler his philosophy of the necessity of overcoming "soulless Jewishness" as the basis for a true German revolution, unlike the false revolution of 1918. Although the need to present himself as a self-made man prevented him from publicly writing or speaking about the debt he owed to Eckart, in private Hitler acknowledged Eckart as having been his teacher and mentor, and the spiritual co-founder of Nazism.

The two first met when Hitler gave a speech before the DAP membership in the winter of 1919. Hitler immediately impressed Eckart, who said of him "I felt myself attracted by his whole way of being, and very soon I realized that he was exactly the right man for our young movement." It is probably Nazi legend that Eckart said about Hitler on their first meeting "That's Germany's next great man–one day the whole world will talk about him." He was not a member of the Thule Society. (Note: Not only was Eckart not a member of the Thule Society, he also never formally joined either the German Workers Party (DAP) or the Nazi Party (NSDAP). Ullrich (2017), pp.105-107)

Eckart, who was 21 years older than Hitler, became the father-figure to a group of younger volkisch men, including Hitler and Hermann Esser, and acted as mediator between the two when they clashed, telling Esser that Hitler, whom he esteemed as the DAP's best speaker, was the far superior man. He became Hitler's mentor, exchanging ideas with him and helping to establish theories and beliefs of the Party. He lent Hitler books to read, gave him a trench coat to wear, and made corrections to Hitler's style of speaking and writing. Hitler was to say later "Stylistically I was still an infant." Eckart also schooled the provincial Hitler in proper manners, and regarded Hitler as his protégé.

Hitler and Eckart had many things in common, including their interest in art and politics, that both thought of themselves primarily as artists, and both were prone to depression. They also shared that their early influences were Jewish, a fact which both preferred not to speak about. Although, unlike Hitler, Eckart did not believe that Jews were a race apart, by the time the two met, Hitler's goal was "the total removal of the Jews", and Eckart had expressed the opinion that all Jews should be put on a train and driven into the Red Sea. He also espoused that any Jew who married a German woman should be jailed for three years, and executed if he repeated the crime. Paradoxically, Eckart also believed that the existence of humanity depended on the antithesis between Aryans and Jews, that one could not exist without the other. In 1919, Eckart had written that it would be "the end of all times ... if the Jewish people perished."

Eckart provided Hitler with entré into the Munich arts scene. He introduced Hitler to the painter Max Zaeper and his salon of like-minded antisemitic artists, and to the photographer Heinrich Hoffmann. It was Eckart who introduced Alfred Rosenberg to Hitler. Between 1920 and 1923, Eckart and Rosenberg labored tirelessly in the service of Hitler and the party. Through Rosenberg, Hitler was introduced to the writings of Houston Stewart Chamberlain, Rosenberg's inspiration. Both Rosenberg and Eckart were influential with Hitler on the subject of Russia. Eckart saw Russia as Germany's natural ally, writing in 1919 that "German politics hardly has another choice than to enter an alliance with a new Russia after the elimination of the Bolshevik regime." He felt strongly that Germany should support the Russian people in their struggle against the "current Jewish regime", by which he meant the Bolsheviks. Rosenberg also counseled Hitler along these lines, with the two men providing Hitler with the intellectual basis for his Eastern policy, which was then made practical by Max Erwin von Scheubner-Richter.

In March 1920, at the behest of Karl Mayr –the German General Staff officer who had first introduced Hitler to politics– Hitler and Eckart flew to Berlin to meet Wolfgang Kapp and take part in the Kapp Putsch, as well as to forge a connection between Kapp's forces and Mayr. Kapp and Eckart knew each other - Kapp had donated 1,000 Marks in support of Eckart's weekly magazine. However, the trip was not a success: Hitler, who wore a false beard, was afraid of heights and got airsick on the way –it was his first airplane flight– and when they arrived in Berlin, the putsch was already collapsing. Nor did they create a positive impression with the Berliners: Captain Waldemar Pabst is said to have told them "The way you look and talk –people are going to laugh at you."

Eckart introduced Hitler to wealthy potential donors connected to the völkisch movement. They worked together to raise money for the DAP in Munich, using Eckart's contacts, but did not have great success. In Berlin, however, where Eckart was better connected with the rich and powerful, they raised considerable funds, including from senior officials of the Pan-German League. Together, they made frequent trips to the capital. During one of them, Eckart introduced Hitler to his future etiquette tutor, socialite Helene Bechstein, and it was through her that Hitler began to move among the upper class of Berlin.

In June 1921, while Hitler and Eckart were on a fundraising trip to Berlin, a mutiny broke out within the Nazi Party in Munich. Members of its executive committee wanted to merge with the rival German Socialist Party (DSP). Hitler returned to Munich on 11 July and angrily tendered his resignation. The committee members realised that the resignation of their leading public figure and speaker would mean the end of the party, so Eckart –who had lobbied the committee not to lose Hitler– was asked by the Party leadership to talk with Hitler and relay the conditions in which Hitler would agree to return to the Party. Hitler announced he would rejoin on the conditions that the party headquarters would remain in Munich, and that he would replace Anton Drexler as party chairman and become the party's dictator, its "Fuhrer". The committee agreed, and he rejoined the party on 26 July 1921.

Eckart would also advise Hitler about the people who had gathered around him and the Party, such as the virulently antisemitic Julius Streicher, the publisher of the quasi-pornographic Der Stürmer. Hitler was repelled by pornography and disapproved of Streicher's sexual activities; he also was distressed by the many intra-party fights that Streicher managed to start. According to Hitler, Eckart told him on multiple occasions "that Streicher was a schoolteacher, and a lunatic to boot, from many points of view. He always added that one could not hope for a triumph of National Socialism without giving one's support to a man like Streicher."

For a time, before Alfred Rosenberg took over the role, Eckart –along with Gottfried Feder– was considered to be the Nazi Party's "philosopher."

=== Growing apart ===
The more confidence that Hitler felt in himself, to a large extent due to Eckart's mentoring, the less that he needed Eckart as a mentor, which resulted in the relationship cooling off.

In November 1922, Eckart and the party's chief fund-raiser outside of Germany, Emil Gansser, made a trip to Zurich, Switzerland to see Alfred Schwarzenbach, a rich entrepreneur in the silk industry. The trip was arranged by Hitler's deputy, Rudolf Hess, who used family connections. While no detailed records of the meeting survive, a repeat visit –with Hitler along as well– was made the following year. This trip was not successful. Hitler made a speech to German expatriates, right-wing Swiss officers, and several dozen Swiss businessmen, but it, and the next day's private meeting, was a fiasco. Hitler blamed Eckart's lack of social graces for the failure of the trip.

After publishing a slanderous poem about Friedrich Ebert, the President of Germany at the time, Eckart ducked an arrest warrant by escaping in early 1923 to the Bavarian Alps near Berchtesgaden, close to the German-Austrian border, under the name "Dr. Hoffman". In April, Hitler visited him there at the Pension Moritz in Obersalzberg, and stayed with him for a few days as "Herr Wolf". It was Hitler's introduction to the area where he would later build his mountain retreat, the Berghof.

Hitler had recently replaced Eckart as the publisher of Völkischer Beobachter with Alfred Rosenberg, although he softened the blow by making it clear that he still regarded Eckart highly. "His accomplishments are everlasting!" Hitler said, he just was not constitutionally able to run a big business like a daily newspaper. "I would not be able to do it, either," according to Hitler, "I have been fortunate that I got a few people who know how to do it. ... It would be as if I tried to run a farm! I wouldn't be able to do it." Nevertheless, tensions between Hitler and Eckart began to appear. Not only were there personal disagreements about the behavior of each towards a woman, but Hitler was annoyed that Eckart didn't believe that a putsch launched in Munich could turn into a successful national revolution. "Munich is not Berlin," Eckart said, "It would lead to nothing but ultimate failure."

Despite his own role in promoting Hitler as a genius and messiah, in May 1923 he complained to Ernst "Putzi" Hanfstaengl, another of Hitler's mentors, that Hitler had "megalomania halfway between a Messiah complex and Neroism" after Hitler had compared himself to Jesus throwing the money-changers out of the temple.

Motivated by his temporary annoyance at Eckart, and by Eckart's impracticality in operational matters, Hitler began attempting to run the party without Eckart's assistance, and when forced to use Eckart again as a political operative, the results were disappointing. Hitler began to see Eckart as a political liability due to his disorganization and his increased drinking. Hitler, however, did not discard or sideline him, as he had with other early comrades who had stood in his way. He stayed close to Eckart intellectually and emotionally, and continued to visit him in the mountains. The relationship between the two men was not simply a political one.

On 9 November 1923, Eckart participated in the failed Beer Hall Putsch. He was arrested and placed in Landsberg Prison along with Hitler and other party officials, but was released shortly thereafter due to illness. He then went to Berchtesgaden to recuperate but died a month later.

=== Hitler as genius and messiah ===
Eckart promoted Hitler as Germany's coming savior. Eckart's hero, Otto Weininger, had formulated a dichotomy in which genius and Jews were opposed. Genius, in Weininger's view, was the epitome of masculinity and non-materialism, while Jews were femininity in its purest form. Eckart took upon himself this philosophy, and considered that the role of genius was to rid the world of the baleful influence of Jews. Many parts of German society held similar views, and were looking for a savior, a "German Messiah", a genius to lead them out of the economic and political morass the country had fallen into as a result of the Treaty of Versailles and the economic effects of the Great Depression.

Under Eckart's tutelage Hitler first began to think of himself as that person, a superior being. Because it was generally believed that geniuses were born and not made, he could not present himself as having been mentored by Eckart and others. Thus in Mein Kampf, Hitler did not mention Eckart or Karl Mayr, or the others who had been instrumental in creating what the world was now meant to see as the natural genius, Adolf Hitler, the German Messiah.

Shortly after the Party purchase of the Völkischer Beobachter in December 1920, and Eckart's installation as editor, with Rosenberg as his assistant, the two men had begun to use the newspaper as a vehicle to disseminate this "Hitler Myth", the notion that Hitler was a superior being, a genius who would be the divine German Messiah – the chosen one. The paper did not refer to Hitler as merely the leader of the Nazi Party; instead, he was "Germany's leader". Other newspapers in Bavaria began to call Hitler "the Bavarian Mussolini." This idea of Hitler's specialness began to spread, so that two years later, in November 1922, the Traunsteiner Wochenblatt newspaper would look ahead to when "the masses of the people will raise [Hitler] up as their leader, and give him their allegiance through thick and thin."

== Death ==
Eckart died in Berchtesgaden on 26 December 1923, shortly after his release from Landsberg Prison from a heart attack compounded by alcoholism and morphine addiction. He was buried in Berchtesgaden's old cemetery, not far from the eventual graves of Nazi Party official Hans Lammers and his wife and daughter.

Although Hitler did not mention Eckart in the first volume of Mein Kampf, after Eckart's death he dedicated the second volume to him, writing that Eckart was "one of the best, who devoted his life to the awakening of our people, in his writings and his thoughts and finally in his deeds." In private, he would admit Eckart's role as his mentor and teacher, and said of him in 1942: "We have all moved forward since then, that's why we don't see what [Eckart] used to be back then: a polar star. The writings of all others were filled with platitudes, but if he told you off: such wit! I was a mere infant then in terms of style." Hitler later told one of his secretaries that his friendship with Eckart was "one of the best things he experienced in the 1920s" and that he never again had a friend with whom he felt such "a harmony of thinking and feeling."

== Memorials ==
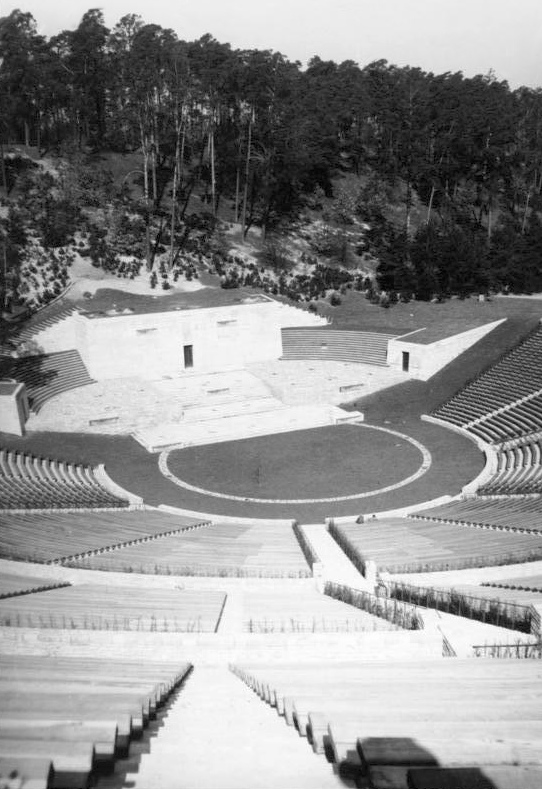
Dietrich-Eckart-Bühne (Dietrich Eckart theatre), 1939

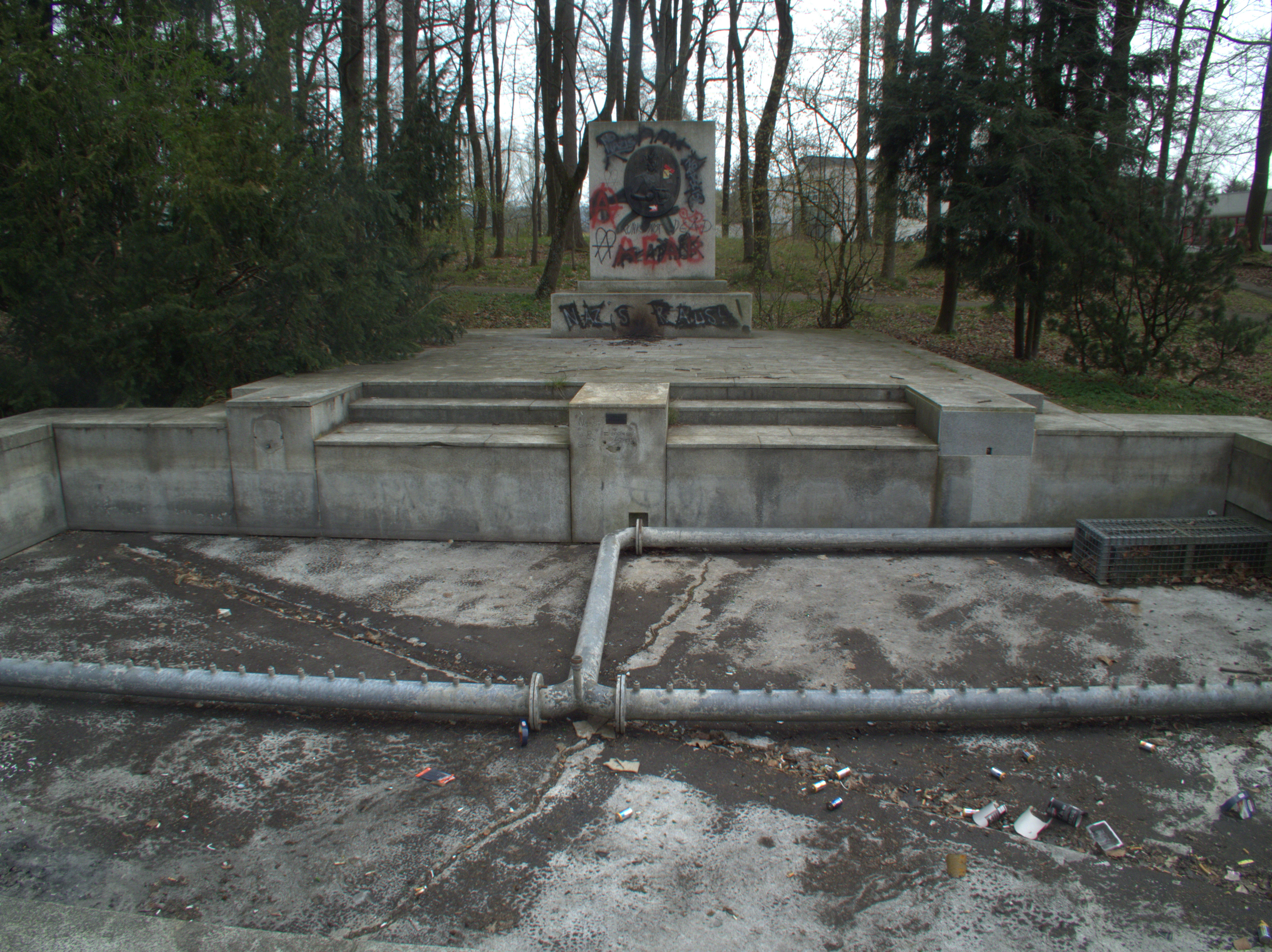
The remains of the former Dietrich Eckart memorial in Neumarkt, covered in anti-Nazi and neo-Nazi graffiti

During the Nazi period, several monuments and memorials were created to Eckart. Hitler named the arena near the Olympic Stadium in Berlin, now known as the Waldbühne (Forest Stage), the "Dietrich-Eckart-Bühne" when it was opened for the 1936 Summer Olympics. The 5th Standarte (regiment) of the SS-Totenkopfverbände was given the honour-title Dietrich Eckart. In 1937 the Realprogymnasium in Emmendingen was expanded and renamed the "Dietrich-Eckart secondary school for boys". Several new roads were named after Eckart. All of these have since been renamed.

Eckart's birthplace in Neumarkt in der Oberpfalz was officially renamed with the added suffix "Dietrich-Eckart-Stadt". In 1934, Adolf Hitler inaugurated a monument in his honour in the city park. It has since been rededicated to Christopher of Bavaria (1416–1448), King of Denmark, who was probably born in the town.

In March 1938, when Passau commemorated Eckart's 70th birthday at Oberhaus Castle, the Lord Mayor announced not only the creation of a Dietrich-Eckart-Foundation but also the restoration of the room where Eckart had been imprisoned. In addition, a street was dedicated to Eckart.

== Ideas and assessments ==
Eckart has been called the spiritual father of Nazism, and indeed Hitler acknowledged him as being its spiritual co-founder.

Eckart viewed World War I not as a holy war between Germans and non-Germans, as it was sometime interpreted toward the end of the conflict, but as a holy war between Aryans and Jews, who, according to him, plotted the fall of the Russian and German empires. To describe this apocalyptic struggle, Eckart adopted extensive imagery from the legends of Ragnarok and from the Book of Revelation.

In 1925, Eckart's unfinished essay Der Bolschewismus von Moses bis Lenin: Zwiegespräch zwischen Hitler und mir ("Bolshevism from Moses to Lenin: Dialogue Between Hitler and Me") was published posthumously. Margarete Plewnia considered the dialogue between Eckart and Hitler to be an invention by Eckart himself, but Ernst Nolte, Friedrich Heer and Klaus Scholder think that the book – which was completed and published posthumously by Rosenberg, allegedly using Eckart's notes – reflects Hitler's own words. Thus historian Richard Steigmann-Gall believed that "[the] book still remains a reliable indicator of [Eckart's] own views."

Steigmann-Gall quotes from the book:

In Christ, the embodiment of all manliness, we find all that we need. And if we occasionally speak of Baldur (a god in Norse mythology), our words always contain some joy, some satisfaction, that our pagan ancestors were already so Christian as to have an indication of Christ in this ideal figure.

Steigmann-Gall concluded that, "far from advocating a paganism or anti-Christian religion, Eckart held that, in Germany's postwar tailspin, Christ was a leader to be emulated." But historian Ernst Piper dismissed Steigmann-Gall's views about a relationship between the admiration of Christ by early members of the NSDAP and a positive relationship with Christianity; Eckart fervently opposed the political Catholicism of the Bavarian People's Party and its national ally the Centre Party, supporting instead a vaguely defined "positive Christianity". From the pages of Vőlkischer Beobachter, Eckart tried to win over Bavarian Catholics to the Nazi's cause, but that attempt ended with the Beer Hall Putsch, which put Nazis at odds with Bavarian Catholics.

Joseph Howard Tyson writes that Eckart's anti-Old Testament views show a strong resemblance to the early Christian heresy Marcionism.

In 1935 Alfred Rosenberg published the book Dietrich Eckart. Ein Vermächtnis ("Dietrich Eckart. A Legacy") with collected writings by Eckart, including this passage:

To be a genius means to use the soul, to strive for the divine, to escape from the mean; and even if this cannot be totally achieved, there will be no space for the opposite of good. It does not prevent the genius to portray also the wretchedness of being in all shapes and colors, being the great artist that he is; but he does this as an observer, not taking part, sine ira et studio, his heart remains pure. ... The ideal in this, just like in every respect whatsoever is Christ; his words "You judge by human standards; I pass judgment on no one" show the completely divine freedom from the influence of the senses, the overcoming of the earthly world even without art as an intermediary. At the other end you find Heine and his race ... all they do culminates in ... the motive, in subjugating the world, and the less this works, the more hate-filled their work becomes that is to satisfy their motive, the more deceitful and fallacious every try to reach the goal. No trace of true genius, the very opposite of the manliness of genius ... (Note: Rosenberg's original German text: "Genie sein heißt Seele betätigen, heißt zum Göttlichen streben, heißt dem Gemeinen entrinnen; und wenn das auch nie ganz gelingt, für das gerade Gegenteil des Guten bleibt doch kein Spielraum mehr. Das hindert nicht, dass der geniale Mensch die Erbärmlichkeiten des Daseins in allen Formen und Farben zeigt, als großer Künstler, der er dann ist; aber das tut er betrachtend, nicht selbst mitgehend, sine ira et studio, unbeteiligten Herzens. ... Das Ideal aber in dieser, wie überhaupt in jeder Beziehung ist Christus; das eine Wort "Ihr richtet nach dem Fleisch, ich richte niemand" offenbart die göttlichste Freiheit vom Einfluss des Sinnlichen, die Überwindung der irdischen Welt sogar ohne das Medium der Kunst. Am entgegengesetzten Ende aber steht Heine mitsamt seiner Rasse, ... gipfelt alles ... im Zweck, die Welt sich gefügig zu machen; und je mehr dies misslingt, desto hasserfüllter das Werk, mit dem das Ziel erreicht werden soll, desto listiger und verlogener aber auch jeder neue Versuch, ans Ziel zu gelangen. Vom wahren Genie keine Spur, gerade das Gegenteil seiner Männlichkeit ... .")

=== Personality ===
Early Nazi adherent Ernst Hanfstaengl remembered Eckart as "a perfect example of an old-fashioned Bavarian with the appearance of a walrus." Eckart was described by journalist Edgar Ansel Mowrer as "a strange drunken genius". His antisemitism supposedly arose from various esoteric schools of mysticism, and he spent hours with Hitler discussing art and the place of the Jews in world history. Samuel W. Mitcham calls Eckart an "eccentric intellectual" and "extreme antisemite" who was also a "man of the world" who liked "wine, women, and pleasures of the flesh." Alan Bullock describes Eckart as having "violent nationalist, anti-democratic, and anti-clerical opinions, a racist with an enthusiasm for Nordic folklore and a taste for Jew-baiting" who "talked well even when he was drunk" and "knew everyone in Munich." According to Richard J. Evans, Eckart, the "failed racist poet and dramatist" blamed his career's failure on Jewish domination of German culture, and defined as "Jewish" anything that was subversive or materialistic. Joachim C. Fest describes Eckart as a "roughhewn and comical figure, with [a] thick round head, [and a] partiality for good wine and crude talk" with a "bluff and uncomplicated manner". His revolutionary goals were to promote "true socialism" and rid the country of "interest slavery". According to Thomas Weber, Eckart had a "jovial but moody nature", while John Toland describes him as "an original raffish man with a touch of genius", and "a tall, bald, burly eccentric who spent much of his time in cafes and beer halls giving equal attention to drink and talk." He was "a born romantic revolutionary ... a master of coffeehouse polemics. A sentimental cynic, a sincere charlatan, constantly on stage, lecturing brilliantly if given the slightest opportunity be it at his own apartment, on the street or in a café."

== Works ==
- "Bolshevism from Moses to Lenin: A Dialogue Between Adolf Hitler and Me" English translation (PDF)
