= Armanen-Orden =

Neopagan esoteric society

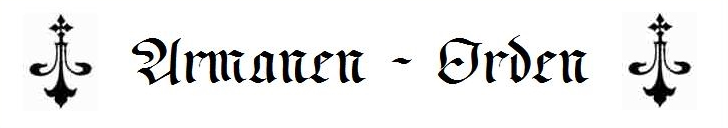
- Formation: 1976
- Type: occult, neo-pagan/religious organization
- Official language: German
- Founder: Adolf Schleipfer, Sigrun von Schlichting
- Website: armanen-orden.blogspot.com

The Armanen-Orden (AO; German for "Armanen Order", "Order of the Armanen") was founded as a revival of the Ariosophical Guido von List Society by German occultist Adolf Schleipfer (b. 1947) and his then-wife Sigrun von Schlichting.

The Armanen-Orden is a neopagan esoteric society and religious order reviving the occult teachings of Guido von List. Its internal structure is organized in nine grades, inspired by Freemasonry. The Order is openly ethnonationalist and racialist, and rejects race-mixing as a modern degeneration.

== History ==
Schleipfer had discovered some of List's works in an antique bookstore in the mid-1960s, and was inspired to found the runic and Armanist magazine Irminsul in hopes of attracting suitable people for a revived Listian order. He was appointed the new president and continued to publish Irminsul as the "Voice of the Guido von List Society."

Schleipfer also attended meetings of a related organisation, the Gode-Orden (Gothi-Order), which propagated a similar mixture of occult völkisch thinking. There he met his wife Sigrun Schleipfer, née Hammerbacher (1940–2009), daughter of the völkisch writer and former NSDAP district leader, Dr. Hans Wilhelm Hammerbacher. In 1976 the Schleipfers founded the Armanen-Orden (Armanen Order) as the reorganised Guido von List Society. Since then, Adolf and Sigrun have served as the Grandmasters of the Order, although they have divorced and Sigrun now refers to herself as "Sigrun von Schlichting" or "Sigrun Freifrau von Schlichting". They also revived the High Armanen Order (HAO) and brought it to "an unprecedented level of activity".

The Armanen-Orden celebrates seasonal festivities in a similar fashion as Odinist groups do and invites interested people to these events. The highlights are three 'Things' at Ostara (Easter), Midsummer and Fall (Wotan's sacrificial death), which are mostly celebrated at castles close to sacred places, such as the Externsteine. The author Stefanie von Schnurbein attended a Fall Thing in 1990 and gives the following report in Religion als Kulturkritik (Religion and Cultural Criticism):

…the participants meet in a room decorated with hand-woven wall hangings and pictures of Germanic gods, Odin and Frigga in this case… At one end of the room is a table covered with black cloth. On this a 4 ft. high wooden Irminsul, a spear, a sword, a replica of a sun disc chariot, a leather-bound copy of The Edda as well as ritual bowls and candles are placed. The participants are seated in a semi-circle in front of the table, the front row being occupied by Order members clothed in their ritual garb (black shirts for the men and long white dresses for the women; both have the AO emblem sewn on them)… after several invocations the 'spirit flame', symbolising Odin in the spirit world, is lit in a bowl filled with lamp oil. The purpose of this cultic celebration is the portrayal of Odin's concentration from spirit into matter. After a recital of the first part of Odin's rune poem () from The Edda, the "blood sacrifice" commences, in which a bowl with animal blood is raised to the beat of a gong and an invocation of sacrifice. Then Odin is called into the realm by the participants who assume the Odal rune stance, whisper 'W-O-D-A-N' nine times and finally sing an ode to Odin with the following words: 'Odin-Wodan come to us, od-uod, uod'. Wodan's sacrifice to himself is symbolised by extinguishing the flame.

In 1977 Sigrun Schleipfer founded the Gemeinschaft zur Erhaltung der Burgen (Society for the Conservation of Castles), which proclaims castles to be among the "last paradises of the romantic era" in this cold modern age and had as its primary aim the purchase and restoration of a castle for the Order. In 1995, the society finally acquired the castle of Rothenhorn in Szlichtyngowa (Poland), a run-down structure dating back to the 12th century, though most of the complex dates from the 16th century.

Over many years, Adolf and Sigrun have republished all of List's works (and many others relating to the Armanen runes) in their original German. Adolf Schleipfer has also contributed an article to The Secret King, a study of Karl Maria Wiligut by Stephen Flowers and Michael Moynihan, in which he points out the differences between Wiligut's beliefs and those which are accepted within Odinism or Armanism.

== Adolf Schleipfer ==
Adolf Schleipfer is a German/Austrian occultist and Armanist who re-established the Guido von List Society and Armanen-Orden in 1967 and 1976, respectively.

Schleipfer re-published all of Guido von Lists works (and many other Armanen runes related works) in their original German.

Schleipfer contributed an article to the book The Secret King entitled "The Wiligut Saga" pointing out the differences between Wiligut's beliefs and those of Odinism or Armanism.

Adolf re-established the Guido-von-List-Society in 1967. In 1976 with his then wife, Sigrun Schleipfer they founded the Armanen-Orden

Schleipfer published the runic magazine Irminsul (magazine) in hopes of attracting suitable people for a revived Listian order.

Sigrun Schleipfer (née Hammerbacher), now referring to herself as "Sigrun Freifrau von Schlichting" or "Sigrun von Schlichting") (daughter of Völkisch writer Hans Wilhelm Hammerbacher). He is thought to be a former Nazi district leader

Adolf met Sigrun at meetings of a related organisation, the Gode-Orden (Gothi-Order), which propagated a similar mixture of occult "Völkisch" thinking.

In 1977 she founded the 'Gemeinschaft zur Erhaltung der Burgen' (Society for the Conservation of Castles), which proclaims castles to be among the "last paradises of the romantic era" in this cold modern age and had as its primary aim the purchase and restoration of a castle for the Order. In Yule 1995, the society finally acquired the castle of Rothenhorn in Szlichtyngowa in Poland, a run-down structure dating back to the 12th century, though most of the complex dates from the 16th century.

== See also ==
- Armanism
- Ariosophy
- Neopaganism in German-speaking Europe

== Bibliography ==
- Sünner, Rüdiger (1997). Schwarze Sonne: Entfesselung und Missbrauch der Mythen in Nationalsozialismus und rechter Esoterik.
- Balzli, Johannes – ‘Guido v. List – Der Wiederentdecker uralter arischer Weisheit (Leipzig and Vienna, 1917)’
- Goodrick-Clarke, Nicholas (2003). The Occult Roots of Nazism: Secret Aryan Cults and Their Influence on Nazi Ideology. Gardners Books. ISBN 1-86064-973-4.; originally published as Goodrick-Clarke, Nicholas (1992). The Occult Roots of Nazism: Secret Aryan Cults and Their Influence on Nazi Ideology; The Ariosophists of Austria and Germany, 1890-1935. New York University Press. ISBN 0-8147-3060-4.
- Goodrick-Clarke, Nicholas (2003). Black Sun: Aryan Cults, Esoteric Nazism and the Politics of Identity. New York University Press. ISBN 0-8147-3155-4.
- Flowers Ph.D., Stephen (aka Edred Thorsson) (1988). The Secret of the Runes. Destiny Books. ISBN 0-89281-207-9.
- Franziska Hundseder: Wotans Jünger. Neuheidnische Gruppen zwischen Esoterik und Rechtsradikalismus. Heyne, München 1998, ISBN 3-453-13191-6, (Heyne Sachbuch), S. 126–132.
