= Ariosophy =

Esoteric philosophy

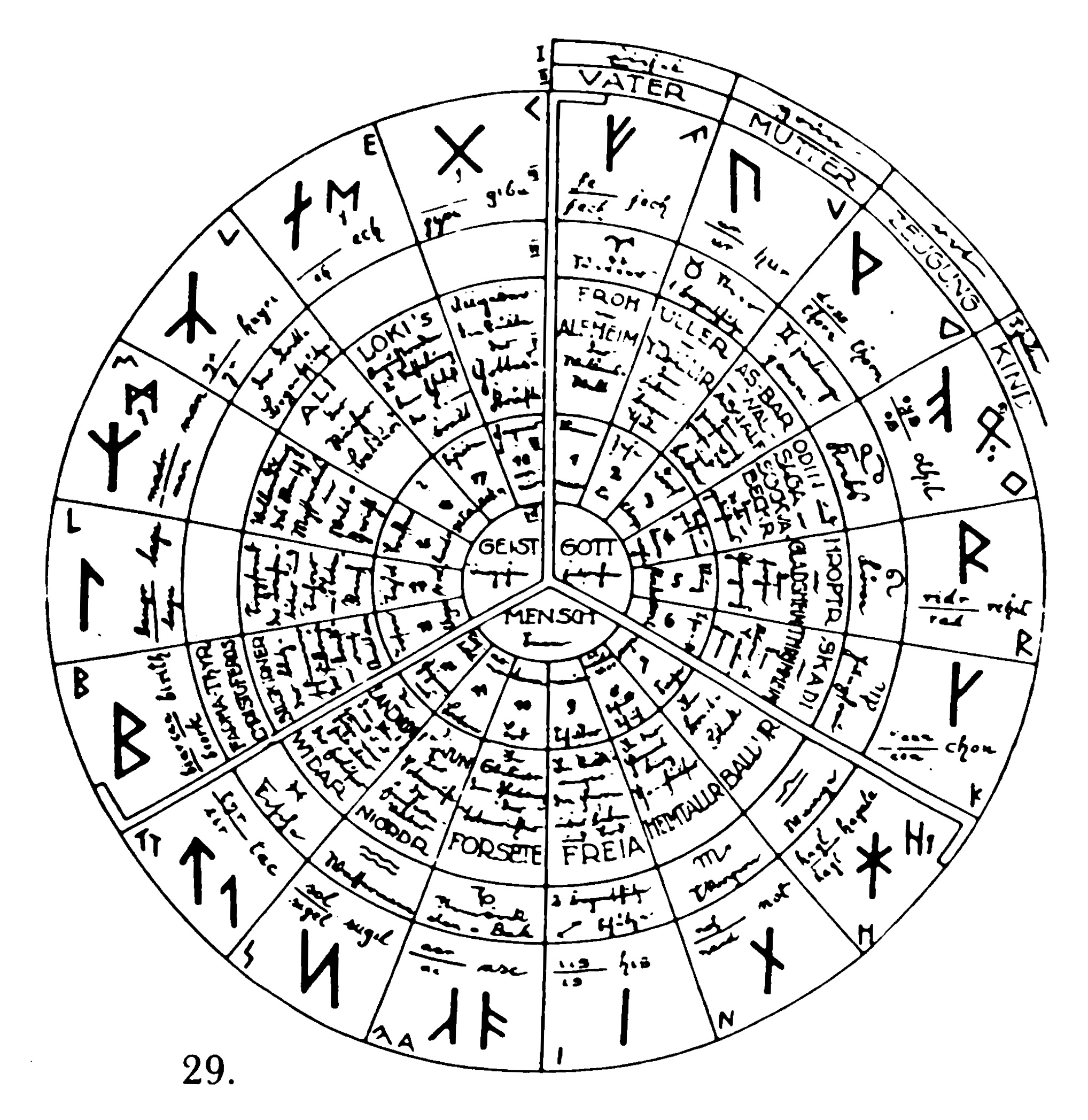
Werner von Bülow's World-Rune-Clock, illustrating the correspondences between List's Armanen runes, the signs of the zodiac and the gods of the months

Ariosophy and Armanism are esoteric ideological systems that were largely developed by Jörg Lanz von Liebenfels and Guido von List, respectively, in Austria between 1890 and 1930. The term 'Ariosophy', which translates to wisdom of the Aryans, was invented by Lanz von Liebenfels in 1915, and during the 1920s, it became the name of his doctrine. For research on the topic, such as Nicholas Goodrick-Clarke's book The Occult Roots of Nazism, the term 'Ariosophy' is generically used to describe the Aryan/esoteric theories which constituted a subset of the 'Völkische Bewegung'. This broader use of the word is retrospective and it was not generally current among the esotericists themselves. List actually called his doctrine 'Armanism', while Lanz used the terms 'Theozoology' and 'Ario-Christianity' before the First World War.

The ideas of Von List and Lanz von Liebenfels were part of a general occult revival that occurred in Austria and Germany during the late 19th and early 20th centuries; a revival that was loosely inspired by historical Germanic paganism, holistic philosophy, and Christianity, as well as by esoteric concepts that were influenced by German romanticism and Theosophy. The connection between this form of Germanic mysticism and historical Germanic culture is evident in the mystics' fascination with runes, in the form of Guido von List's Armanen runes.

== Overview ==
The ideology regarding the Aryan race (referring to Indo-Europeans), runic symbols, the swastika, and sometimes occultism are important elements of Ariosophy. By 1899 at the earliest or by 1900 at the latest, esoteric notions entered Guido von List's thoughts. In April 1903, he sent his manuscript, proposing what Goodrick-Clarke calls a "monumental pseudoscience" concerning the ancient German faith, to the Imperial Academy of Sciences in Vienna onwards. These Ariosophic ideas (together with, and influenced by, Theosophy) contributed significantly to an occult counterculture in Germany and Austria. A historic interest in this topic has stemmed from the ideological relationship between Ariosophy and Nazism, and it is obvious in such book titles as:

- The Occult Roots of Nazism by Nicholas Goodrick-Clarke
- Der Mann, der Hitler die Ideen gab (The Man Who Gave Hitler His Ideas), Wilfried Daim's biography of Lanz von Liebenfels

However, Goodrick-Clarke's comprehensive study finds little evidence of direct influence, except in the case of the highly idiosyncratic ancient-German mythos that was elaborated by the "clairvoyant" SS-Brigadeführer Karl Maria Wiligut, (Note: In November 1924, Wiligut was committed to the Salzburg mental asylum and declared insane. "The full report on his mental condition referred to his violence at home, including threats to kill his wife, grandiose projects, eccentric behaviour, and occult interests, before diagnosing a history of schizophrenia involving megalomaniac and paranoid delusions. A Salzburg court ruled that he was incompetent to administer his own affairs on the basis of this medical evidence". The case is fully described in Mund's (1982) biography. Throughout his confinement and after his release in 1927, Wiligut continued his ancient-Germanic pretensions. He retired from the SS on 28 August 1939 after his psychiatric history, previously a closely guarded secret, became an embarrassment to Himmler.) of which the practical consequences were, first, the incorporation of Wiligut's symbolism into the ceremonies of an elite circle within the SS; and, secondly, the official censure of those occultists and runic magicians whom Wiligut stigmatized as heretics, which may have persuaded Heinrich Himmler to order the internment of several of them. (Note: The cases of three Listian occultists – Kummer, Lauterer and Marby – are discussed below. In 1938 Wiligut's recommendations were also decisive in securing the official disapproval of the Italian esotericist Julius Evola.) The most notable other case is Himmler's Ahnenerbe. (For the debate on the direct relations to Nazi ideology, see Religious aspects of Nazism.) Goodrick-Clarke examines what evidence there is for influences on Hitler and other Nazis, but he concludes that "Ariosophy is a symptom of rather than an influence in the way that it anticipated Nazism".

=== 'Ariosophic' writers and organisations ===
While a broad definition of the term 'Ariosophy' is useful for some purposes, various of the later authors, including Ellegaard Ellerbek, Philipp Stauff and Günther Kirchoff, can more exactly be described as cultivating the Armanism of List. In a less broad approach, one could also treat rune occultism separately. Although the Armanen runes go back to List, Rudolf John Gorsleben distinguished himself from other völkisch writers by making the esoteric importance of the runes central to his world view. Goodrick-Clarke therefore refers to the doctrine of Kummer and Gorsleben and his followers as rune occultism, a description that also fits the eclectic work of Karl Spiesberger. Highly practical systems of rune occultism, influenced mainly by List, were developed by Friedrich Bernhard Marby and Siegfried Adolf Kummer. Also worthy of mention are Peryt Shou, the occult novelist; A. Frank Glahn, noted more for his pendulum dowsing; Rudolf von Sebottendorff and Walter Nauhaus, who built up the Thule Society; and Karl Maria Wiligut, who was the most notable occultist working for the SS.

Organisations include: the Guido von List Society, the High Armanen Order, the Lumen Club, the Ordo Novi Templi, the Germanenorden (in which a schism occurred) and the Thule Society.

== Armanism ==
Guido von List in 1910 from the book Guido v. List: Der Wiederentdecker Uralter Arischer Weisheit by Johannes Balzli, published in 1917

Guido von List elaborated a racial religion premised on the concept of renouncing the imposed Semitic creed of Christianity and returning to the native religions of the ancient Indo-Europeans (List preferred the equivalent term Ario-Germanen, or 'Aryo-Germanics'). He recognised the theoretical distinction between the Proto-Indo-European language and its daughter Proto-Germanic language, but frequently obscured it by his tendency to treat them as a single long-lived entity (although this framing is also used in linguistics as the Germanic parent language). In this, he became strongly influenced by the Theosophical thought of Helena Blavatsky, which he blended with his own highly original beliefs, founded upon Germanic paganism.

Before he turned to occultism, Guido List had written articles for German Nationalist newspapers in Austria, as well as four historical novels and three plays, some of which were "set in tribal Germany" before the advent of Christianity. He also had written an anti-semitic essay in 1895. List adopted the aristocratic von between 1903 and 1907.

List called his doctrine Armanism after the Armanen, supposedly a body of priest-kings in the ancient Aryo-Germanic nation. He claimed that this German name had been Latinized into the tribal name Herminones mentioned in Tacitus, and that it actually meant the heirs of the sun-king: an estate of intellectuals who were organised into a priesthood called the Armanenschaft.

His conception of the original religion of the Germanic tribes was a form of sun worship, with its priest-kings (similar to the Icelandic goði) as legendary rulers of ancient Germany, who were immortalized as the gods of the various Aryan faiths. Religious instruction was imparted on two levels. The esoteric doctrine (Armanism) was concerned with the secret mysteries of the gnosis, reserved for the initiated elite, while the exoteric doctrine (Wotanism) took the form of popular myths intended for the lower social classes.

List believed that the transition from Wotanism to Christianity had proceeded smoothly under the direction of the skald poets, so that native customs, festivals and names were preserved under a Christian veneer and only needed to be "decoded" back into their heathen forms. This peaceful merging of the two religions had been disrupted by the forcible conversions under "bloody Charlemagne – the Slaughterer of the Saxons". List claimed that the dominance of the Roman Catholic Church in Austria-Hungary constituted a continuing occupation of the Germanic tribes by the Roman Empire, albeit now in a religious form, and a continuing persecution of the ancient religion of the Germanic peoples and Celts.

He also believed in the magical powers of the old runes. From 1891 onwards he claimed that heraldry was based on a system of encoded runes, so that heraldic devices conveyed a secret heritage in cryptic form. In April 1903, he submitted an article concerning the alleged Aryan proto-language to the Imperial Academy of Sciences in Vienna. Its highlight was a mystical and occult interpretation of the runic alphabet, which became the cornerstone of his ideology. Although the article was rejected by the academy, it would later be expanded by List, and grew into his final masterpiece, a comprehensive treatment of his linguistic and historical theories, published in 1914 as Die Ursprache der Ario-Germanen und ihre Mysteriensprache (The Proto-Language of the Aryo-Germanics and their Mystery Language).

List's doctrine has been described as gnostic, pantheist, and deist. At its core is the mystical union of God, man, and nature. Wotanism teaches that God dwells within the individual human spirit as an inner source of magical power, but is also immanent within nature through the primal laws that govern the cycles of growth, decay, and renewal. List explicitly rejects a Mind-body dualism of spirit versus matter, or of God over or against nature. Humanity is therefore one with the universe, which entails an obligation to live in accordance with nature. But the individual human ego does not seek to merge with the cosmos. "Man is a separate agent, necessary to the completion or perfection of ‘God's work’". Being immortal, the ego passes through successive reincarnations until it overcomes all obstacles to its purpose. List foresaw the eventual consequences of this in a future utopia on Earth, which he identified with the promised Valhalla, a world of victorious heroes:

Thus in the course of uncounted generations all men will become Einherjar, and that state – willed and preordained by the godhead – of general liberty, equality, and fraternity will be reached. This is that state which sociologists long for and which socialists want to bring about by false means, for they are not able to comprehend the esoteric concept that lies hidden in the triad: liberty, equality, fraternity, a concept which must first ripen and mature in order that someday it can be picked like a fruit from the World Tree.

List was familiar with the cyclical notion of time, which he encountered in Norse mythology and in the theosophical adaptation of the Hindu time cycles. He had already made use of cosmic rhythms in his early journalism on natural landscapes. In his later works, (Note: Goodrick-Clarke refers especially to Die Armanenschaft der Ario-Germanen. Zweiter Teil, 1911 and the second edition of Die Armanenschaft der Ario-Germanen. Erster Teil, 1913.) List combined the cyclical concept of time with the "dualistic and linear time scheme" of western apocalypticism, which counterposes a pessimism about the present world with an ultimate optimism regarding the future one. In Das Geheimnis der Runen, List addresses the seeming contradiction by explaining the final redemption of the linear time frame as an exoteric parable that stands for the esoteric truth of renewal in many future cycles and incarnations. This is counter to the original Norse myths and Hinduism, where the cycle of destruction and creation is repeated indefinitely, thus offering no possibility of ultimate salvation.

=== Guido von List Society and High Armanen Order ===
Already in 1893 Guido List (Note: Guido List started to use the aristocratic von in his name between 1903 and 1907.) together with Fanny Wschiansky, had founded the Literarische Donaugesellschaft, a literary society.

In 1908 the Guido von List Society (Guido-von-List-Gesellschaft) was founded primarily by the Wannieck family (Friedrich Wannieck and his son Friedrich Oskar Wannieck being prominent and enthusiastic Armanists) as an occult völkisch organisation, with the purpose of financing and publishing List's research. The List Society was supported by many leading figures in Austrian and German politics, publishing, and occultism. (Note: A list of the signatories in support of the Guido-von-List-Gesellschaft is printed in GLB 3 (1908), p. 197f. Membership lists of the Guido-von-List-Gesellschaft are printed in GLB 2 (1908), pp. 71–4 and GLB 5 (1910), pp. 384–9. The articles of the List Society are printed in GLB 1, second edition (1912), pp. 68–78.) Although one might suspect a völkisch organisation to be antisemitic, the society included at least two Jews among its members: Moritz Altschüler, a rabbinical scholar, and Ernst Wachler. The List Society published List's works under the series Guido-List-Bücherei (GLB). (Note: Two other later works of List were published by Adolf Burdeke in Zürich. For a complete list of List's books, see the bibliography in Goodrick-Clarke 1985: 274.)

List had established exoteric and esoteric circles in his organisation. The High Armanen Order (Hoher Armanen Orden) was the inner circle of the Guido von List Society. Founded in midsummer 1911, it was set up as a magical order or lodge to support List's deeper and more practical work. The HAO conducted pilgrimages to what its members considered "holy Armanic sites", Stephansdom in Vienna, Carnuntum etc. They also had occasional meetings between 1911 and 1918, but the exact nature of these remains unknown. In his introduction to List's The Secret of the Runes, Stephen E. Flowers notes: "The HAO never really crystallized in List's lifetime – although it seems possible that he developed a theoretical body of unpublished documents and rituals relevant to the HAO that have only been put into full practice in more recent years".

=== Listians under the Third Reich ===
List died on 17 May 1919, a few months before Adolf Hitler joined a minor Bavarian political party and formed it into the NSDAP. After the Nazis had come to power, several advocates of Armanism fell victim to the suppression of esotericism in Nazi Germany.

The main reason for the persecution of occultists was the Nazi policy of systematically closing down esoteric organisations (although Germanic paganism was still practised by some Nazis on an individual basis), but the instigator in certain cases was Himmler's personal occultist, Karl Maria Wiligut. Wiligut identified the monotheistic religion of Irminism as the true ancestral belief, claiming that Guido von List's Wotanism and runic row constituted a schismatic false religion.

Among the Listians – Kummer and Marby are not mentioned by Goodrick-Clarke among the signatories who endorsed the List Society around 1905 but both men were indebted to "Listian" ideas – who were subjected to censure were the rune occultists Friedrich Bernhard Marby and Siegfried Adolf Kummer, both of whom were denounced by Wiligut in 1934 in a letter to Himmler. Flowers writes: "The establishment of [an] 'official NS runology' under Himmler, Wiligut, and others led directly to the need to suppress the rune-magical 'free agents' such as Marby". Despite having openly supported the Nazis, Marby was arrested by the Gestapo in 1936 as an anti-Nazi occultist and was interned in Welzheim, Flossenbürg and Dachau concentration camps. Kummer disappears from History after Wiligut's denunciation in 1934, and his fate is unknown. He may have died in a concentration camp. According to Rudgley, "[u]nsubstantiated rumours" have him fleeing Nazi Germany in exile to South America, but "it is more likely that he perished in one of the camps that Marby was to survive or died during the Allied bombing of Dresden."

Günter Kirchhoff, a List Society member whom Wiligut had recommended to Himmler on the strength of his researches into prehistory, is reported to have written that Wiligut by intrigue had ensured that Ernst Lauterer (a.k.a. "Tarnhari") – another List Society member, who claimed a secret clan tradition that rivalled Wiligut's own – was committed to a concentration camp as an "English agent". Flowers and Moynihan reproduce Kirchhoff's testimony as reported by both Adolf Schleipfer and researcher Manfred Lenz (but doubted by Wiligut's former secretary Gabriele Dechend).

== Theozoology ==
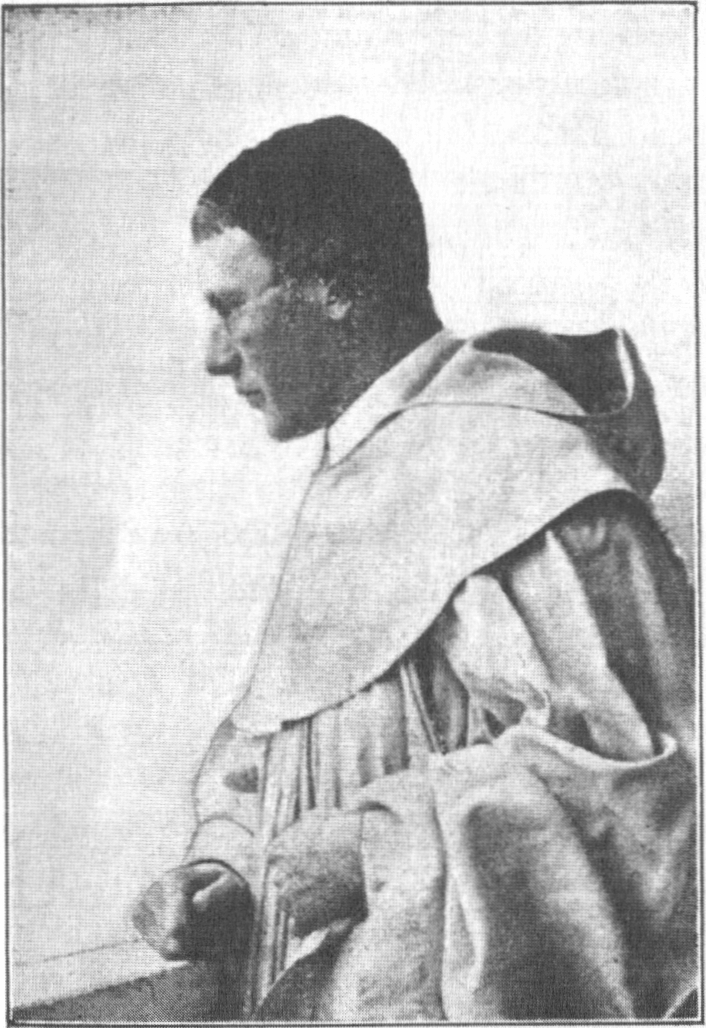
Jörg Lanz von Liebenfels (code name of the fascist agitator Adolf Joseph Lanz)

In 1903–04, a Viennese ex-Cistercian monk and inventor named Jörg Lanz-Liebenfels (subsequently, Jörg Lanz von Liebenfels) published a lengthy article under the Latin title "Anthropozoon Biblicum" ("The Biblical Man-Animal") in a journal for Biblical studies edited by Moritz Altschüler, a Jewish admirer of Guido von List. The author undertook a comparative survey of ancient Near Eastern cultures, in which he detected evidence from iconography and literature that seemed to point to the continued survival, into early historical times, of hominid ape-men similar to the Neanderthal men known from fossil remains in Europe, or the Pithecanthropus (now called Homo erectus) from Java. Furthermore, Lanz systematically analysed the Old Testament in the light of his hypothesis, identifying and interpreting coded references to the ape-men that substantiated an illicit practice of interbreeding between humans and "lower" species in antiquity.

In 1905 he expanded these researches into a fundamental statement of doctrine titled Theozoologie oder die Kunde von den Sodoms-Äfflingen und dem Götter-Elektron ("Theozoology, or the Science of the Sodomite-Apelings and the Divine Electron"). He claimed that "Aryan" peoples originated from interstellar deities (termed Theozoa) who bred by electricity, while "lower" races were a result of interbreeding between humans and ape-men (or Anthropozoa). The effects of racial crossing caused the atrophy of paranormal powers inherited from the gods, but these could be restored by the selective breeding of pure Aryan lineages. The book relied on somewhat lurid sexual imagery, decrying the abuse of white women by ethnically inferior but sexually active men. Thus, Lanz advocated mass castration of racially "apelike" or otherwise "inferior" males. In the same year, Lanz commenced publication of the journal Ostara (named after a pagan Germanic goddess of spring) to promote his vision of racial purity.

=== Order of the New Templars ===
Flag of the Order of the New Templars

On December 25, 1900, Lanz founded the fascist secret society Order of the New Templars (Ordo Novi Templi, or ONT) – a project to unite and mobilise right-wing extremists using esotericism to justify violence, such as the castration of innocent people. The ONT was modelled after the Catholic military order Knight Templars and similar in its hierarchical structure to the Order of Cistercians, the group that had trained Lanz. Members used code names to make betrayal more difficult.

The ideological association was headquartered at Burg Werfenstein, a castle in Upper Austria overlooking the river Danube. Rituals were designed to beautify life in accordance with Aryan aesthetics, and to express the Order's theological system, which Lanz called Ario-Christianity. The Order was the first to associate the swastika with Aryanism, with its flag displaying a red swastika facing right on a yellow field and surrounded by four blue fleurs-de-lys.

The ONT declined from the mid-1930s and – even though it had pioneered many ideas that the Nazis later adopted – it was suppressed by the Gestapo in 1942. By this time it had established seven communities in Austria, Germany and Hungary. Despite suspending its activities in the Greater German Reich, the ONT survived in Hungary until around the end of World War II. It went underground in Vienna after 1945, but was contacted in 1958 by a former Waffen-SS lieutenant, Rudolf Mund, who became Prior of the Order in 1979. Mund also wrote biographies of Lanz and Wiligut.

=== Ariosophy ===
The term "Ariosophy" (wisdom concerning the Aryans) was coined by Lanz in 1915, with "Theozoology" describing its genesis and "Ario-Christianity" as the label for the overall doctrine in the 1920s. (Note: "The term "Ariosophy", meaning occult wisdom concerning the Aryans, was first coined by Lanz von Liebenfels in 1915 and became the label for his doctrine in the 1920s. List actually called his doctrine "Armanism", while Lanz used the terms "Theozoology" and "Ario-Christianity" before the First World War. In this book [i.e. The Occult Roots of Nazism] 'Ariosophy' is used generically to describe the Aryan-racist-occult theories of both men and their followers.")

This terminology was taken up by a group of occultists, formed in Berlin around 1920 and referred to by one of its main figures, Ernst Issberner-Haldane, as the 'Swastika-Circle'. Lanz's publisher, Herbert Reichstein, made contact with the group in 1925 and formed it into an institute with himself as director. This association was named the Ariosophical Society in 1926, renamed the Neue Kalandsgesellschaft (from Kaland, Guido von List's term for a secret lodge or conventicle) in 1928, and renamed again as the Ariosophische Kulturzentrale in 1931, the year in which it opened an Ariosophical School at Pressbaum that offered courses and lectures in runic lore, biorhythms, yoga and Qabalah.

The institute maintained a friendly collaboration with Lanz, its guiding intellect and inspiration, but also acknowledged an indebtedness to List, declaring itself as the successor to the Armanen priest-kings and their hierophantic tradition. Reichstein's circle therefore established the historical precedent for a broad conception that was followed by Nicholas Goodrick-Clarke in 1985 when he redefined Ariosophy as a general term to describe Aryan-centric occult theories and hermetic practices, including both Lanz's Ario-Christianity and the earlier Armanism of List, as well as later derivatives of both systems. If the term is employed in this extended sense, then Guido von List, and not Lanz von Liebenfels, was the founder of Ariosophy.

The broader definition has been justified on the basis that List and Lanz had influenced each other mutually. The two men joined one another's societies; List figures in Lanz's pedigree of initiated predecessors; and Lanz is cited several times by List in The Religion of the Aryo-Germanic Folk: Esoteric and Exoteric (1910).

== Germanenorden ==
Although List had been concerned "to awaken German nationalist consciousness", the High Armanen Order had addressed itself to the upper and middle class Germans in Austria, and here List had preferred the "role of the mystagogue" over political activism. List's disciples, however, became active in the Reichshammerbund and the Germanenorden, two "historically significant", "virulently antisemitic groups" in Germany. Both groups were organized by the political activist Theodor Fritsch, a major figure in German antisemitism. Fritsch, born 1852, was the son of Saxon peasants, and he was concerned about the "small tradesmen and craftsmen" and their threat from what he perceived to be the large 'Jewish' industry.

The List-inspired Germanenorden (Germanic Order or Teutonic Order, not to be confused with the medieval German order of the Teutonic Knights) was a völkisch secret society in early 20th-century Germany. It was founded in Berlin in 1912 by Theodor Fritsch and several prominent German occultists including Philipp Stauff, who held office in the List Society and High Armanen Order as well as Hermann Pohl, who became the Germanenorden's first leader. The group was a clandestine movement aimed at the upper echelons of society and was a sister movement to the more mainstream Reichshammerbund.

The order, whose symbol was a swastika, had a hierarchical fraternal structure similar to Freemasonry. Local groups of the sect met to celebrate the summer solstice, an important neopagan festivity in völkisch circles (and later in Nazi Germany), and more regularly to read the Eddas as well as some of the German mystics.

In addition to occult and magical philosophies, it taught to its initiates nationalist ideologies of Nordic racial superiority and antisemitism, then rising throughout the Western world. As was becoming increasingly typical of völkisch organisations, it required its candidates to prove that they had no non-Aryan bloodlines and required from each a promise to maintain purity of his stock in marriage.

In 1916, during World War I, the Germanenorden split into two parts. Eberhard von Brockhusen became the Grand Master of the "loyalist" Germanenorden. Pohl, previously the order's Chancellor, founded a schismatic offshoot: the Germanenorden Walvater of the Holy Grail. He was joined in the same year by Rudolf von Sebottendorff (formerly Rudolf Glauer), a wealthy adventurer with wide-ranging occult and mystical interests. A Freemason and a practitioner of sufism and astrology, Sebottendorff was also an admirer of Guido von List and Lanz von Liebenfels. Convinced that the Islamic and Germanic mystical systems shared a common Aryan root, he was attracted by Pohl's runic lore and became the Master of the Walvater's Bavarian province late in 1917. Charged with reviving the province's fortunes, Sebottendorff increased membership from about a hundred in 1917 to 1500 by the autumn of the following year.

== Thule Society ==
In 1918 Sebottendorff made contact with Walter Nauhaus, a member of the Germanenorden who headed a "Germanic study group" called the Thule Gesellschaft (Thule Society). The name of Nauhaus's original Thule Society was adopted as a cover-name for Sebottendorff's Munich lodge of the Germanenorden Walvater when it was formally dedicated on August 18, 1918, with Pohl's assistance and approval. Sebottendorff states that the group was run jointly by himself and Nauhaus. Nauhaus was later executed by communists during the German Revolution.

Deriving elements of its ideology and membership from earlier occult groups founded by List (Guido von List Society, established 1908) and by Lanz von Liebenfels (the Order of the New Templars, established 1907), the Thule Society was dedicated to the triune god Walvater, identified with Wotan in triple form. For the Society's emblem Sebottendorff selected the oak leaves, dagger and swastika. The name Thule (an island located by Greek geographers at the northernmost extremity of the world) was chosen for its significance in the works of Guido von List. According to Thule Society mythology, Thule was the capital of Hyperborea, a legendary country supposedly in the far North polar regions, originally mentioned by Herodotus, citing (among other sources) Egyptian ones. In 1679, Olaf Rudbeck equated the Hyperboreans with the survivors of Atlantis, who were first mentioned by Plato, again following Egyptian sources. Friedrich Nietzsche (1844–1900) began his work Der Antichrist (The Antichrist) in 1895 with, "Let us see ourselves for what we are. We are Hyperboreans."

From a historian's perspective, the importance of the Thule Society lies in its organising the discussion circle that led to the German Workers' Party (Deutsche Arbeiter-Partei, or DAP), founded in January 1919. The Thule Society's Karl Harrer was a co-founder, along with Anton Drexler (the party's first chairman). Later the same year, Adolf Hitler joined the DAP, which was renamed as the National Socialist German Workers' Party (German: Nationalsozialistische Deutsche Arbeiterpartei (NSDAP) or Nazi party, registered from 20 February 1920) on April 1, 1920. Some conspiracy-theorists argue that the NSDAP, when under Hitler's leadership, was a political front for the Thule Society. However, against this theory stands Harrer's and Drexler's resistance to Hitler. After unsuccessful challenges to his growing power, both men resigned from the party, Harrer in 1920 and Drexler in 1923.

Speculative authors assert that a number of high Nazi Party officials had been members of the Thule Society (including such prominent figures as Max Amann, Dietrich Eckart, Rudolf Hess, Alfred Rosenberg and Gottfried Feder). Eckart, the wealthy publisher of the newspaper Auf gut Deutsch (In Plain German), has been represented as a committed occultist and the most significant Thule influence on Hitler. He is believed to have taught Hitler a number of persuasive techniques, and so profound was his influence that the second volume of Hitler's book Mein Kampf was dedicated to him. However, although Eckart attended Thule Society meetings, he was not a member and there is nothing to indicate that he trained Hitler in techniques of a mystical nature. Examining the membership lists, Goodrick-Clarke notes that Hess, Rosenberg and Feder were – like Eckart – guests of the Thule Society in 1918 but not actual members. He also describes a Thule Society membership roll including Hans Frank and Heinrich Himmler as "spurious". There is no evidence that Hitler himself had any connection with the Society, even as an associate or visitor. However, a member of the Thule Society, dentist Dr. Friedrich Krohn, did choose the swastika symbol for the Nazi party (although the design was revised at Hitler's insistence).

In 1923, Sebottendorff was expelled from Germany as an undesirable alien; around 1925, the Thule Society disbanded. In 1933, Sebottendorff returned to Germany and published Bevor Hitler kam: Urkundliches aus der Frühzeit der nationalsozialistischen Bewegung von Rudolf von Sebottendorff. The book was banned by the Bavarian Political Police on March 1, 1934; Sebottendorff was arrested by the Gestapo, interned in a concentration camp, then expelled to Turkey yet again, where he committed suicide by drowning in the Bosphorus on May 9, 1945, as the Nazis surrendered to the Allies.

== Edda Society ==
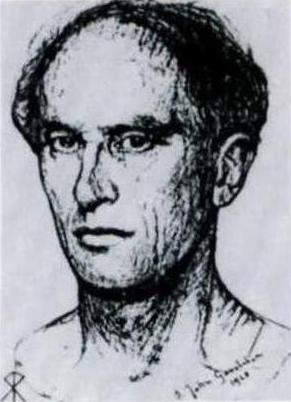
Rudolf John Gorsleben

Rudolf John Gorsleben was associated with the Thule Society during the Bavarian Soviet Republic of 1919 and, along with Dietrich Eckart, he was taken prisoner by the Communists, narrowly escaping execution. He threw himself into the ferment of Bavaria's völkisch politics and formed a close working relationship with the local Germanenorden before devoting himself to literary pursuits.

On 29 November 1925, Gorsleben founded the Edda Society (Edda-Gesellschaft), a mystic study group, at Dinkelsbühl in Franconia. He himself was Chancellor of the Society and published its periodical Deutsche Freiheit (German Freedom), later renamed Arische Freiheit (Aryan Freedom). Assisted by learned contributors to his study-group, Gorsleben developed an original and eclectic mystery religion founded in part upon the Armanism of List, whom he quoted with approval.

Grand Master of the Society was Werner von Bülow (1870–1947). The treasurer was Friedrich Schaefer from Mühlhausen, whose wife, Käthe, kept open house for another occult-völkisch circle (the 'Free Sons of the North and Baltic Seas') that gathered around Karl Maria Wiligut in the early 1930s. Mathilde von Kemnitz, a prolific völkisch writer who married General Erich Ludendorff in 1926, was an active member of the Edda Society. (Note: According to 'Lexicon of Ariosophy' by Frater Georg Nikolaus of the ONT, an undated manuscript preserved in the Rudolf Mund Archive (Vienna) and cited in Goodrick-Clarke (1985), pp. 159, 254.)

When Rudolf John Gorsleben died from heart disease in August 1930, the Edda Society was taken over by Bülow who had designed a 'world-rune-clock' that illustrated the correspondences between the runes, the gods and the zodiac, as well as colours and numbers. Bülow also took over the running of Gorsleben's periodical and changed its name from Arische Freiheit to Hag All All Hag, and then Hagal.

== Modern organisations ==
In the later 20th century, Germanic neopagan movements oriented themselves more towards polytheistic reconstructionism, turning away from theosophic and occult elements, but elements of Ariosophical mysticism continue to play a role in some white supremacist organizations. Alleged mystical or shamanic aspects of historical pre-Christian Germanic culture, summarized as seidr are also practiced in Odinism (Freya Aswynn, Nigel Pennick, Karl Spiesberger, see also Germanic Runic Astrology, The Book of Blotar).

=== Armanen-Orden ===
Circular arrangement of the Armanen Futharkh

The Guido von List Society was re-established in the late 1960s through contacts between the German/Austrian occultist Adolf Schleipfer (1947–) and the still-living last president of the Society, Hanns Bierbach. Schleipfer had discovered some of List's works in an antique bookstore in the mid-1960s, and was inspired to found the runic and Armanist magazine Irminsul in hopes of attracting suitable people for a revived Listian order. He was appointed the new president and continued to publish Irminsul as the "Voice of the Guido von List Society."

Schleipfer also attended meetings of a related organisation, the Gode-Orden (Gothi-Order), which propagated a similar mixture of occult völkisch thinking. There he met his wife Sigrun Schleipfer, née Hammerbacher (1940–2009), daughter of the völkisch writer and former NSDAP district leader, Dr. Hans Wilhelm Hammerbacher. In 1976 the Schleipfers founded the Armanen-Orden (Armanen Order) as the reorganised Guido von List Society. Since then, Adolf and Sigrun have served as the Grandmasters of the Order, although they have divorced and Sigrun now refers to herself as "Sigrun von Schlichting" or "Sigrun Freifrau von Schlichting". They also revived the High Armanen Order (HAO) and brought it to "an unprecedented level of activity".

The Armanen-Orden is a neopagan esoteric society and religious order reviving the occult teachings of Guido von List. Its internal structure is organized in nine grades, inspired by Freemasonry. The order is modelled on, but not limited to, the precepts of List, and its principles as formulated in its brochures are as follows:

The Armanen Order embodies the entire Germanic and Celtic peoples in their mental, spiritual and physical uniqueness.

The Armanen Order embodies the true realisation of the divine world order based on Germanic and Celtic wisdom, whose religious and cultic aspect is formed by the native myths of the gods.

The Awakening of the Armanen Order is a rebirth of life based on its natural foundations of the Germanic and Celtic people.

The Armanen-Orden celebrates seasonal festivities in a similar fashion as Odinist groups do and invites interested people to these events. The highlights are three 'Things' at Ostara (Easter), Midsummer and Fall (Wotan's sacrificial death), which are mostly celebrated at castles close to sacred places, such as the Externsteine. The author Stefanie von Schnurbein attended a Fall Thing in 1990 and gives the following report in Religion als Kulturkritik (Religion and Cultural Criticism):

…the participants meet in a room decorated with hand-woven wall hangings and pictures of Germanic gods, Odin and Frigga in this case… At one end of the room is a table covered with black cloth. On this a 4 ft. high wooden Irminsul, a spear, a sword, a replica of a sun disc chariot, a leather-bound copy of The Edda as well as ritual bowls and candles are placed. The participants are seated in a semi-circle in front of the table, the front row being occupied by Order members clothed in their ritual garb (black shirts for the men and long white dresses for the women; both have the AO emblem sewn on them)… after several invocations the 'spirit flame', symbolising Odin in the spirit world, is lit in a bowl filled with lamp oil. The purpose of this cultic celebration is the portrayal of Odin's concentration from spirit into matter. After a recital of the first part of Odin's rune poem () from The Edda, the "blood sacrifice" commences, in which a bowl with animal blood is raised to the beat of a gong and an invocation of sacrifice. Then Odin is called into the realm by the participants who assume the Odal rune stance, whisper 'W-O-D-A-N' nine times and finally sing an ode to Odin with the following words: 'Odin-Wodan come to us, od-uod, uod'. Wodan's sacrifice to himself is symbolised by extinguishing the flame.

In 1977 Sigrun Schleipfer founded the Gemeinschaft zur Erhaltung der Burgen (Society for the Conservation of Castles), which proclaims castles to be among the "last paradises of the romantic era" in this cold modern age and had as its primary aim the purchase and restoration of a castle for the Order. In 1995, the society finally acquired the castle of Rothenhorn in Szlichtyngowa (Poland), a run-down structure dating back to the 12th century, though most of the complex dates from the 16th century.

Over many years, Adolf and Sigrun have republished all of List's works (and many others relating to the Armanen runes) in their original German. Adolf Schleipfer has also contributed an article to The Secret King, a study of Karl Maria Wiligut by Stephen Flowers and Michael Moynihan, in which he points out the differences between Wiligut's beliefs and those that are accepted within Odinism or Armanism.

== Research ==
After the war, Lanz von Liebenfels was first brought to a wider (and scholarly) attention with Wilfried Daim's book Der Mann, der Hitler die Ideen gab (The Man Who Gave Hitler His Ideas) (1957). Although the book was not always taken seriously within academia, for some time Lanz was seen as one of the most important influences on Hitler. Since the 1990s, however, historians have cast doubt on Lanz' significance. The historian Brigitte Hamann, who has written Hitler's Vienna: A Dictator's Apprenticeship, is of the view that Lanz partly influenced Hitler's diction, but had only marginal influences on Adolf Hitler's religious views.

=== The occult roots of Nazism ===
Some of Lanz's proposals for racial purification anticipate the Nazis. The sterilisation of those deemed to be genetically "unfit" was in fact implemented under the Nazi eugenics policies, but its basis lay in the theories of scientific racial hygienists. The Nazi eugenics programme has no proven connection with Lanz's mystical rationale. Eugenic ideas were widespread in his lifetime, whereas he himself was banned from publishing in the Third Reich and his writings were suppressed.

Following Goodrick-Clarke's caution in assessing the relation between the two, Adolf Hitler cannot be considered a pupil of Lanz von Liebenfels, as Lanz himself had claimed. However, it has been suggested with some evidential basis that the young Hitler did read and collect Lanz's Ostara magazine while living in Vienna:

In view of the similarity of their ideas relating to the glorification and preservation of the endangered Aryan race, the suppression and ultimate extermination of the non-Aryans, and the establishment of a fabulous Aryan-German millennial empire, the link between the two men looks highly probable.

Nevertheless: "It also remains a fact that Hitler never mentioned the name of Lanz in any recorded conversation, speech, or document. If Hitler had been importantly influenced by [Lanz], he cannot be said to have ever acknowledged this debt".

== See also ==
- Black Sun (occult symbol)
- Fylfot
- Julius Evola
- Ludwig Fahrenkrog
- Neopaganism in German-speaking Europe
- René Guénon
- Sig Rune

== Notes ==
=== Bibliography ===
- Balzli, Johannes (1917). Guido v. List: Der Wiederentdecker Uralter Arischer Weisheit – Sein Leben und sein Schaffen (in German). Leipzig and Vienna: Guido-von-List-Gesellschaft.
- Flowers, Stephen E.; Moynihan, Michael (2008). The Secret King: The Myth and Reality of Nazi Occultism. Feral House and Dominion Press. ISBN 978-1-932595-25-3. (paperback) and Flowers, Stephen E.; Moynihan, Michael (2007). The Secret King: The Myth and Reality of Nazi Occultism. Feral House and Dominion Press. ISBN 978-0-9712044-6-1. (hardcover). Revised and expanded edition of Flowers, Stephen E.; Moynihan, Michael (2001). The Secret King: Karl Maria Wiligut, Himmler's Lord of the Runes. The Real Documents of Nazi Occultism. Dominion Press and Rûna-Raven Press.
- Goodrick-Clarke, Nicholas (1985). The Occult Roots of Nazism: The Ariosophists of Austria and Germany 1890–1935. Wellingborough, England: The Aquarian Press. ISBN 0-85030-402-4. Republished as The Occult Roots of Nazism: Secret Aryan Cults and Their Influence on Nazi Ideology: The Ariosophists of Austria and Germany, 1890–1935. New York University Press. 1992. ISBN 0-8147-3060-4.) and as The Occult Roots of Nazism: Secret Aryan Cults and Their Influence on Nazi Ideology. Gardners Books. 2003. ISBN 1-86064-973-4.
- Goodrick-Clarke, Nicholas (2003). Black Sun: Aryan Cults, Esoteric Nazism and the Politics of Identity. New York University Press. ISBN 0-8147-3155-4.
- Kertzer, David (2001). The Popes Against the Jews: The Vatican's Role in the Rise of Modern Anti-Semitism. Knopf. ISBN 0-375-40623-9.
- Lange, Hans-Jürgen. (1998). Weisthor : Karl-Maria Wiligut : Himmlers Rasputin und seine Erben (in German). Arun. ISBN 3-927940-35-6. OCLC 48419221.
- Lanz-Liebenfels, Jörg (1903). "Anthropozoon Biblicum". Vierteljahrsschrift für Bibelkunde. 1: 307–55, 429–69.
- Lanz-Liebenfels, Jörg (1904). "Anthropozoon Biblicum". Vierteljahrsschrift für Bibelkunde. 2: 26–60, 314–35, 395–412.
- Lanz-Liebenfels, Jörg (1905). Theozoologie: oder die Kunde von den Sodoms-Äfflingen und dem Götter-Elektron. Vienna. (Republished as Lanz von Liebenfels, Georg Jörg (2002). Theozoologie: oder die Kunde von den Sodoms-Äfflingen und dem Götter-Elektron. Deutschherrenverl. ISBN 978-3-8311-3157-0.)
- List, Guido von (1988). The Secret of the Runes (Guido-von-List-Bücherei 1). Translated by Flowers, Stephen E. Rochester, Vermont: Destiny Books. ISBN 0-89281-207-9.
- List, Guido von (1910). Die Religion der Ario-Germanen in ihrer Esoterik und Exoterik (in German). Zürich.
- Marby, Friedrich B. (1935). Rassische Gymnastik als Aufrassungsweg (in German). Stuttgart: Marby-Runen-Bücherei 5/6.
- Mund, Rudolf J. (1982). Der Rasputin Himmlers: Die Wiligut-Saga (in German). Vienna.
- Phelps, Reginald H. (1963). "'Before Hitler Came': Thule Society and Germanen Orden". The Journal of Modern History. 35 (3): 245–261. doi:10.1086/243738. JSTOR 1899474. S2CID 143484937.
- Rudgley, Richard (2006). Pagan Resurrection: A Force for Evil or the Future of Western Spirituality?. London: Century. ISBN 978-0-7126-8096-7.
- Schleipfer, Adolf (2007). "The Wiligut Saga". Archived from the original on 2009-10-27. In Flowers & Moynihan 2007 Originally published in Irminsul 5. 1982.
- Schnurbein, Stefanie von (1995) [1992]. Religion als Kulturkritik (in German).
- Strohm, Harald (1997) [1973]. Die Gnosis und der Nationalsozialismus [Gnosis and National Socialism]. Suhrkamp. ISBN 3-932710-68-1.
- Sünner, Rüdiger (1997). Schwarze Sonne: Entfesselung und Missbrauch der Mythen in Nationalsozialismus und rechter Esoterik (in German).
- Thomas, Robert (2005). The Nature of Nazi Ideology (history) (PDF). Archived from the original (PDF) on 2007-09-27.
