= Árpád von Nahodyl =

German politician and neopagan (born 1958)

- Born: 8 February 1958 (age 68); Cologne, West Germany
- Education: Berlin University of the Arts
- Occupations: Writer, neopagan activist and politician

Árpád von Nahodyl (born 8 February 1958) is a German writer, neopagan activist and local politician. His books on pagan subjects, esotericism, divination and mythology are published under the pseudonym Géza von Neményi. Active in Germany's neopagan scene since the early 1980s, he founded the Heidnische Gemeinschaft which attracted media attention and controversy in that decade. After leaving the organization, he founded the Germanische Glaubens-Gemeinschaft in 1991, of which he is the spiritual leader and self-titled Allsherjagode.

Nahodyl promotes a form of Germanic neopaganism that involves influences from Theosophy and New Age. He has been a controversial figure among German neopagans due to purported proximity to the far right—which he denies—and for declaring himself the leader of all contemporary pagans in the country. He has been involved in local politics for A90/The Greens, the Social Democratic Party and most recently Alternative for Germany.

== Early life ==
Árpád von Nahodyl was born in Cologne, West Germany. He grew up in West Berlin. He has a degree in visual communication from the Berlin University of the Arts.

== Pagan revivalism ==
In 1982, Nahodyl advertised for people interested in studying mythology and performing pagan rites. A small neopagan group was formed. Due to the isolation of West Berlin, the group came to study local history and tried to localize historical cult sites in the city. The group had a romantic conception of paganism, characterized it as a nature religion and treated witchcraft as a synonym for folk religion. The group was eventually formalized as the Heidnische Gemeinschaft (Pagan Community).

In the mid-1980s, Nahodyl's group came to the attention of journalists, who called it a cult and associated it with the 1978 Jonestown mass murder. City officials, church officials and newspapers such as Bild-Zeitung (24 February 1984) and Der Spiegel (7 January 1985) alleged that the group was based on Nazi ideology, due to its Germanic imagery and interest in German history. The group was not political, although some members did maintain far-right contacts. Nahodyl, under his pseudonym Géza von Neményi, began to appear in public at events to give his view of the group. Journalists, politicians and other neopagans associated Neményi with Ariosophy and blood and soil ideology, so the group remained controversial in the German mainstream.

Having left the Heidnische Gemeinschaft, Neményi founded the organization Germanische Glaubens-Gemeinschaft (GGG) in 1991. The GGG took its name from Germany's first Germanic neopagan organization, which had been founded by Ludwig Fahrenkrog before World War I and became defunct in 1964. The practices of Neményi's GGG have included recitations of hymns from the Rigveda and belief in reincarnation. The organization has been influenced by Theosophy and New Age, from which it absorbed concepts from modern Gnosticism and neoshamanism.

In 2003, Neményi became the centre of a controversy when he launched himself as the highest authority for all "traditional pagans" in Germany. He gave himself the title Allsherjargode, derived from the medieval Icelandic title allsherjargoði. Neményi argued that this institution would solve the problems caused by the failures to establish an umbrella organization for German pagans. The move was met with fierce resistance within the German neopagan scene.

Among the books written under the name Géza von Neményi are Heidnische Naturreligion. Altüberlieferte Glaubensvorstellungen, Riten und Bräuche (1988, lit. 'Pagan nature religion. Old traditional beliefs, rites and customs'), Heidentum und NS-Ideologie (1997, lit. 'Paganism and NS ideology') and Heilige Runen. Zauberzeichen des Nordens (2004, lit. 'Sacred runes. Magic signs of the North').

== Political activity ==
In the 1980s, Nahodyl was a board member for the Berlin section of the Green Party. In 1985, he and his brother came under investigation during a purge of party members with far-right sympathies. Both brothers denied having any such sympathies, but were still expelled from the party. After this Nahodyl was active in the Social Democratic Party for a period. In 2014, he was a candidate for Alternative for Germany in the local elections in Bad Belzig.

== See also ==
- Modern paganism and New Age
- Neopaganism in German-speaking Europe
