= Modern paganism in German-speaking Europe =

Neopaganism in German-speaking Europe

Since its emergence in the 1970s, Neopaganism (Neuheidentum) in German-speaking Europe has diversified into a wide array of traditions, particularly during the New Age boom of the 1980s.

Schmid (2006) distinguishes four main currents:

- Germanic neopaganism/Ásatrú
- Wicca
- Neoshamanism

== History ==
=== Early forms ===
Neopaganism in Germany and Austria has been strongly influenced by the occultist Germanic mysticism pioneered by Guido von List and Jörg Lanz von Liebenfels in the 1890 to 1930 period. A Guido von List Society was founded 1908. Other early groups influenced by List were the Deutschgläubige Gemeinschaft (1911), the Germanenorden (1912) and the Germanische Glaubens-Gemeinschaft (1907).

The contemporary term Deutschgläubig for these movements may be translated as either "German Faith", "Teutonic Faith" or in the more archaic usage of Deutsch as "folk belief". Several of these groups came together in 1933 forming an Arbeitsgemeinschaft der Deutschen Glaubensbewegung. There was however no unified take on the contents of a Deutschgläubig religiosity, and approaches varied from a "national Christianity" based on the Arianism of the Goths, German mysticism, Humanism and free thought, as well as racialist ideas of a native Nordic or Aryan religion. The radical free-thinking tendency combined with the Nordicist one to the effect of pronounced hostility towards Christianity and the Church. Krause et al. (1977:557) distinguish four basic types subsumed under Deutschgläubig:

1. the Deutscher Glaube of Jakob Wilhelm Hauer, inspired by influences of Hinduism and mysticism combined with elements of Neoplatonism, Humanism, Renaissance and the German classics
2. "Nordic" religion embraced as the native religion of the Nordic race, rejecting Christianity on grounds of being a foreign ("Semitic") intrusion. This branch is the closest to later "folkish" Germanic neopaganism, postulating that a people's native religion is based on a "racial soul" (Rassenseele), comparable to current ideas of Metagenetics in "folkish" neopaganism. Ludwig Fahrenkrog and his Germanische Glaubens-Gemeinschaft represent a specifically Germanic approach within the "Nordic" group.
3. The political approach as represented by Alfred Rosenberg which rejects religiosity in favour of pure völkisch political ideology.
4. Mathilde Ludendorff's "ethnocentric soteriology" as taken up by the Tannenbergbund (1925).

=== Third Reich and aftermath ===
The Thule Society originated as an offshoot of the Germanenorden in 1917, and notoriously became associated with the Deutsche Arbeiterpartei in 1919 and thus involved in the formative phase of the Nazi Party. By the rise of the Third Reich in 1933, the Thule society had been dissolved, and esoteric organisations (including völkisch occultists) were suppressed by the Nazi regime, many closed down by anti-Masonic legislation in 1935. Nevertheless, some elements of Germanic mysticism found reflection in the symbolism employed by the Nazis, mostly due to Heinrich Himmler's interest in the occult and sponsorship of the Austrian Ariosophist Karl Wiligut. As early as 1940, the occult scholar and folklorist Lewis Spence identified a neopagan undercurrent in Nazism, for which he largely blamed Alfred Rosenberg, and which he equated with "satanism". This notion of a Nazi occultism has been relativized as superficial. Heinz Höhne, an authority on the SS, observes that "Himmler's neo-pagan customs remained primarily a paper exercise". In Hamburg which was considered a stronghold, only 0.49% of the inhabitants identified as belonging to the neopagan faith movement (in 1937).

With the fall of the Third Reich, the Deutschgläubig movement was finished, appearing suspect at least during the period of denazification (Krause 1977:558). But völkisch religiosity began to re-surface as early as 1951 with the Artgemeinschaft and the Deutsche Unitarier.

=== 1970s to 1980s ===
Neopaganism saw a revival in the 1970s, partly by US influence, partly by the revival of pre-war occultist societies. The Armanenorden was re-established in 1976.

The Heidnische Gemeinschaft (HG; "Heathen Community") was founded in 1985 by Géza von Neményi, formerly of the Armanenorder, and in contrast to that movement explicitly distances itself from extreme-right ideas. Members are urged to forgo racial and fascist ideals, to have a positive and respectful attitude towards the earth and nature, to participate in democracy instead of aiming for totalitarianism, to promote equality of the sexes, and to worship the gods whose existence underlies cultural tradition.

The 1980s were dominated by the New Age movement, giving rise to a significant neopagan movement detached in origin from the völkisch or deutschgläubig history of German neopaganism. Wicca and the Goddess movement begins to take hold in German feminist subculture in this period, e.g. with Heide Göttner-Abendroth, whose "International Academy for Modern Matriarchal Studies and Matriarchal Spirituality" (HAGIA) was founded in 1986. The German Wicca movement is dominated by the US feminist currents of Dianic Wicca and the Reclaiming community advocating radical environmentalism (REMID).

=== 1990s to present ===
==== Germanic neopaganism in Germany ====
A renewed interest in Germanic neopaganism or Asatru in particular becomes apparent in the later 1990s, based on inspiration from the English-speaking world rather than historical deutschgläubig groups, with the foundation of the Rabenclan (1994) and of a German chapter of Odinic Rite in 1995, followed by Nornirs Ætt in 1997 and the Eldaring as a chapter of the US The Troth in 2000.

Fahrenkrog's Germanische Glaubens-Gemeinschaft was reactivated in 1991 by Géza von Neményi, who had received the organization's archives from Dessel as the result of a hostile split of the Heidnische Gemeinschaft, which von Neményi had founded in 1985. Von Neményi had been a member of the board of the Green Party in Berlin until 1985, when he was expelled together with his brother for alleged connections to the neo-Nazi milieu, an accusation which both men denied. Subsequently, the GGG successfully sued the Artgemeinschaft, which also claimed to be the legal successor of Fahrenkrog's organization.

However, in 1995 the GGG denied being a continuation of Fahrenkrog's organization. In 1997, the GGG again claimed to have been founded in 1907. Since the foundation/reactivation of GGG, von Neményi has claimed the title of Allsherjargode (an Icelandic title translating approximately to "high priest") and position of a spiritual leader, a claim rejected and mocked by most other neopagan groups in Germany.

Within Germanic neopaganism in Germany in particular, debate on neopaganism and neo-Nazism is very prominent and controversial. The large majority of German neopagans vehemently renounce all right extremist associations, especially since a 1996 case of a Sauerland neo-Nazi who had confessed to four murders which he claimed were inspired by the command of Odin. The controversy is kept alive because there remain a number of neo-Nazi or far-right neopagan groups, with Jürgen Rieger's Artgemeinschaft (Rieger died 2009) notoriously domain squatting asatru.de since 1999.

The Rabenclan and Nornirs Ætt groups were particularly prominent in this respect in the 1990s, with their anti-racist "Ariosophy project" actively denouncing right extremists within the German neopagan movement. Other groups, like the Germanische Glaubens-Gemeinschaft do not take a clear position with regard to völkisch or New Right schools of thoughts. The Eldaring avoids taking any political stance and rejects the "folkish" vs. "universalist" division as inapplicable.

The Verein für germanisches Heidentum (VfGH), formerly "Odinic Rite Deutschland" has been associated with the folkish Odinic Rite in Britain from 1995, but later severed organisational ties and was renamed to its present name in 2006. The "folkish" concept of Metagenetics advocated in US Asatru by Stephen McNallen was introduced into German discourse by Volker "Stilkam" Wagner of Odinic Rite Deutschland, a position harshly attacked by the Rabenclan as völkisch or New Right ideology.

==== Austria and Switzerland ====
Celtic neopaganism and neo-Druidism is particularly popular in Austria, by virtue of Austria being the location of the Proto-Celtic Hallstatt culture. The Keltendorf in Diex, Kärnten combines archaeological reconstruction with "European geomancy". The Europäisch Keltische Gemeinschaft has been active since 1998.

The Pagan Federation has chapters in Austria and Germany. There is no organized neopagan group in Switzerland, the Eldaring catering also to Swiss and Austrian members. A loose network centered around interest in Alpine paganism has been active in Switzerland under the name Firner Situ (the Old High German translation of Forn Sed) since 2006.

== See also ==
- Deutsche Mythologie
- Esotericism in Germany and Austria
- Interpretatio germanica
- List of modern pagan temples
- Munich Cosmic Circle
- Nietzschean affirmation
- Viking revival
- Conrad Celtes
- Walter F. Otto

== Literature ==
- Georg Schmid, Neuheidentum (2002/2006)
- "Wicca" (REMID)
- Martin Schwarz, Wege und Irrwege der Evola-Rezeption in Deutschland
- Daniel Junker (ed.), Heidnisches Jahrbuch 2007, Verlag Daniel Junker, ISBN 978-3-938432-06-8.
- Daniel Junker, Die Germanische Glaubens-Gemeinschaft, Ein Beitrag zur Geschichte völkischer Religiosität in der Weimarer Republik (2002), ISBN 978-3-8311-3380-2
- GardenStone, Der germanische Götterglaube. Asatru - eine moderne Religion aus alten Zeiten, Arun-Verlag (2003), ISBN 978-3-935581-40-0.
- Miro Jennerjahn, Neue Rechte und Heidentum. Zur Funktionalität eines ideologischen Konstrukts, Peter Lang (2006), ISBN 3-631-54826-5.
- Krause et al. (eds.), Theologische Realenzyklopädie, Walter de Gruyter (1977), ISBN 978-3-11-008563-1, s.v. " Deutschgläubige Bewegung" pp. 554ff.
- Hunt, Stephen (2003). Alternative Religions: A Sociological Introduction. Burlington: Ashgate Publishing Company. ISBN 0-7546-3409-4.
