= Hammerbacher =

Hammerbacher is a German surname. Notable people with the surname include:

- Anton Hammerbacher (1871–1956), German politician
- Hans Wilhelm Hammerbacher (1903–1980), German writer
- Herta Hammerbacher (1900–1985), German landscape architect
- Jeff Hammerbacher, American data scientist
