= Order of the New Templars =

German fascist secret society (e. 1900)

Flag of the Order of New Templars.

The Order of the New Templars – Ordo Novi Templi was a proto-fascist secret society in Germany founded by Jörg Lanz von Liebenfels (the code name of Fascist agitator Adolf Joseph Lanz) in 1900. Lanz used this order to spread his ideas, which he initially referred to as "theozoology" or "Ario-Christianity" and from 1915 as "Ariosophy". The order combined esoteric piety with concepts of racial "science" and eugenics, which were modern at the time. It was modelled after the Catholic military order of the Knights Templar and was similar in its hierarchical structure to the Order of Cistercians which had trained the New Templars founder, Adolf Lanz.

Lanz's goal was to bring right-wing extremists in post-World War I Germany together and mobilise them in opposition to liberal society. Members used code names to hinder any chance of betrayals. The order would later provide support to the rise of Nazism.

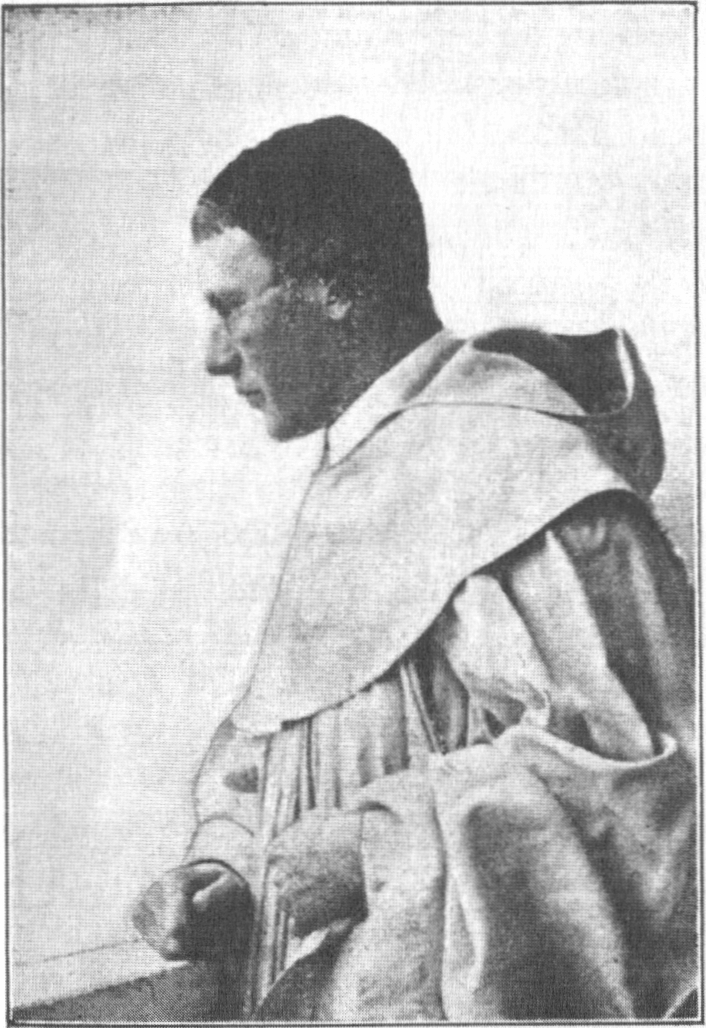
Jörg Lanz von Liebenfels (code name of the fascist agitator Adolf Joseph Lanz).

Lanz was the ideologist and political agitator of the group, justifying violence by punishments such as castration in order to establish Fascism in Germany and defend it against communism. Lanz intended the organization to put an end to the racial conflict between the supposedly higher-bred "master class" and lower-bred "animal people" and to enforce it by force "up to the castration knife" (Lanz). Lanz's ideas should allow the upper class and imperialist groups to justify "any exploitation". Specifically, "the enslavement" of the population was to be reintroduced and this rule by "the emasculation" of be enforced by those who think differently. Women should be called "slaves" and "breeding mothers" serve.

The right-wing extremist and anti-Semite Nivard Schlögl trained and radicalized Lanz. Lanz had left the Cistercian order shortly before and tied the naming of his own order to the medieval Templar Order. His interest in the Templars was awakened by the contemporary popular motif of the Knights of the Grail in the neo-romantic music and literature of Richard Wagner, Erwin Guido Kolbenheyer, and Friedrich Lienhard. In addition, the Templars were closely connected with the Cistercians; Bernhard von Clairvaux, the founder of the Cistercian order, had also written the monastic rules of the Templars and later praised them for their use in the crusades.

Around the time of his order's founding, Lanz developed into a determined racist, who saw in the Aryans as the supreme race, which since time immemorial has been in a defensive struggle against lower races. Against this background, he conceived the idea that the Templars had the goal of establishing an Aryan empire across the entire Mediterranean area. He interpreted the persecution of the Templars from 1312 as a triumph of racially inferior people whose aim was to undermine the rule and purity of the Aryan race. In addition, he was convinced that the Catholic Church had been suppressing true Christian teaching since that time, as the core of which he regarded his ideas of a racial struggle. He therefore saw his own order as a new beginning of the crusade against lower races that had been interrupted for centuries.

In 1907 Lanz acquired the ruins of the small Werfenstein Castle near Grein in Upper Austria as the priory of the Order. In the same year he published a program of the Order, in which he described it as an association of Aryans whose aims were to promote racial consciousness through genealogical and heraldic research, beauty pageants, and to promote the establishment of racially exemplary states in underdeveloped regions of the world. For the order he developed his own liturgy and ceremonies. The rules of the order stipulated that only blonde and blue-eyed men were allowed to join, who also had to meet other Aryan criteria, which Lanz described in his series of publications Ostara. A hierarchy was established within the order based on (supposed) racial purity. On Christmas Day 1907, Lanz hoisted two flags on the tower of his Order's headquarters: one with the coat of arms of the von Liebenfels family, an aristocratic family that presumably died out around 1790 and that he claimed to be descendants of, and one with a swastika, which was already a popular Volkish symbol.

From 1908, public festivals were held at Werfenstein. Several hundred guests traveled by steamboat on the Danube, where the castle is located, and were greeted with cannon shots, after which they celebrated extensively in the castle courtyard. This found great resonance in the national press and stimulated interest in Lanz's publications.

Lanz continued to work on the ceremonies and composed devotional songs and verses. The castle was decorated with solemn representations of Hugues de Payens, the first Grand Master of the Templars, and with representations of the "monkeys" who, in his theozoology, were regarded as the origin of the lower races. In 1915 and 1916 a New Templar Breviary was published in two parts, which Lanz had written with other friars. It contained psalms and hymns that drew on Christian tradition but supplicated Christ to redeem the Aryan race and wipe out the lower races.

Their symbol was a yellow flag with a swastika and four fleurs-de-lys. The golden background symbolized eternity, the lilies racial purity, and the red swastika the rising Aryan hero.

== See also ==
- Ariosophy
- Secret society
