= Elahe Haschemi Yekani =

German academic

Elahe Haschemi Yekani is a German English Studies professor of English and American literature/culture with a focus on Postcolonial Studies at the Institute for English and American Studies at Humboldt-Universität zu Berlin. Her research focuses on Gender Studies, Queer Theories and Intersectionality.

== Professional career ==
Elahe Haschemi Yekani studied English and American Studies and Theater Studies/Cultural Communication at Humboldt-Universität zu Berlin and London from 1998 to 2004. She completed her Magister at the Humboldt-Universität zu Berlin with the Magister thesis: BODY-TOPIA. Images of lesbian bodies in the writings of Monique Wittig and Jeanette Winterson. From 2007 to 2012 she was research assistant for English Studies at the Institute for English and American Studies at Humboldt University Berlin. In 2007, she was an associate member of the Research Training Group Gender as a Category of Knowledge. After completing her doctorate in 2009 (summa cum laude) at the Humboldt University of Berlin (supervisors: Eveline Kilian and Stefanie von Schnurbein), she taught there in 2011 as Visiting Professor of Modern English Literature at the Institute of English and American Studies and in 2012 held the junior professorship in British Cultural Studies at the Institute of English and American Studies at the University of Potsdam. From 2012 to 2014, she was University Assistant for English Literature and Culture at the Institute of English Studies at Leopold-Franzens-University Innsbruck in Austria. From 2014 to 2017, she taught at the Department of English and American Studies at Europa-Universität Flensburg as Junior Professor of English Literature. Since 2017, Haschemi Yekani has been Professor of English and American Literature and Culture with a focus on Postcolonial Studies at the Institute of English and American Studies at Humboldt-Universität zu Berlin.

Haschemi Yekani is a member of numerous associations such as the Anglistenverband and was a member of the board of the Zentrum für transdisziplinäre Geschlechterstudien at the Humboldt-Universität zu Berlin.

=== Research ===
Her research interests include the English-language novel from its beginnings to the present, Black Atlantic literature, postcolonial studies, gender/masculinity studies and queer theory, intersectionality, cultural studies, film and television studies, post-World War II theater, and pop culture. Her work focuses on postcolonial and masculinity/gender studies as well as queer theory.

She is the author of The Privilege of Crisis. Narratives of Masculinities in Colonial and Postcolonial Literature, Photography and Film. Her second monograph, Familial Feeling, juxtaposes the literary history of canonical bourgeois novels of the late 18th and 19th centuries with the first written testimonies of Black British women writers. Hashemi Yekani places the differences of bourgeois self-assertion through publications by Jane Austen, the Brontës and Charles Dicken in the context of long marginalized Testimonies of Black British or transatlantic Olaudah Equiano, Ignatius Sancho, Mary Prince and Mary Seacole in this work. This form of tension between the canonical texts on the one hand, and the long marginalized texts on the other, is presented in this project as an entangled literary history. It is about emotional connections through those who have been excluded from the realm of the human, the human family, and about the meaning of postcolonial Writing]]-understood as a form of writing that accomplishes decolonization.
