= Friedrich Wannieck =

Friedrich Wannieck in München from the book "Der Wiederentdecker Uralter Arischer Weisheit" by Johannes Balzli

Friedrich Wannieck (1838 in Brno, Austrian Empire –1919) was an Austrian/German industrialist most notable for his successful business ventures and his enthusiastic support for the völkisch author, pioneer of Germanic mysticism and runic revivalist, Guido von List. He is the father of Friedrich Oskar Wannieck.

He was an Armanist and supporter of List's Armanen runes system. He was also an ardent Spiritualist and a firm believer in the Theosophical mahatmas, Morya and Koot Hoomi.

== Biography ==
Friedrich Wannieck in München from the book Deutsch Mythologische Landschaftsbilder by Guido von List

Wannieck founded Friedrich Wannieck & Co. in 1864. He was also chairman of the Prague Iron Company and the First Brno Engineering Company, both major producers of capital goods in the Habsburg empire. He was also president of the organisation and publishing house Verein "Deutsches Haus" ("German House" Association) in Brno. This was a nationalist association for German inhabitants of the city, who knew it by the name of Brünn and felt encircled by the overwhelming Czech population of South Moravia (Goodrick-Clarke 1985: 37).

In 1888 the Verein "Deutsches Haus" published an historical work entitled Der altdeutsche Volksstamm der Quaden [The Ancient German Quadi Tribe] by Heinrich Kirchmayr. Wannieck was impressed by the parallels between List's clairvoyant account of the Quadi and the academic study of Kirchmayr. Between Wannieck and List there developed a regular correspondence that laid the basis of a lasting friendship. The Verein "Deutsches Haus" later published three of List's works in its own book-series of nationalist studies of history and literature (ibid.).

Wannieck's munificence eventually led to the foundation of the Guido-von-List-Gesellschaft (Guido von List Society) twenty years later. Around 1905, he and his son Friedrich Oskar were among the signatories to the initial announcement endorsing the formation of the Society. This came to fruition with an official founding ceremony in 1908. The Society's assets came mostly from the Wanniecks, who put up more than 3000 crowns at the inauguration (ibid., 43-44).

== Family ==
Friedrich Oskar Wannieck, 6 July 1912, from the book “Guido v. List: Der Wiederentdecker Uralter Arischer Weisheit - Sein Leben und sein Schaffen” by Johannes Balzli

Friedrich Oskar Wannieck (died July 6, 1912) was an Austrian/German and the son of Friedrich Wannieck. He, along with his father, were two of the initial signatories creating the Guido-von-List-Gesellschaft in support of their good friend, Guido von List.

He was an Armanist and supporter of the Armanen runes system.
