= Mathilde Ludendorff =

German psychiatrist

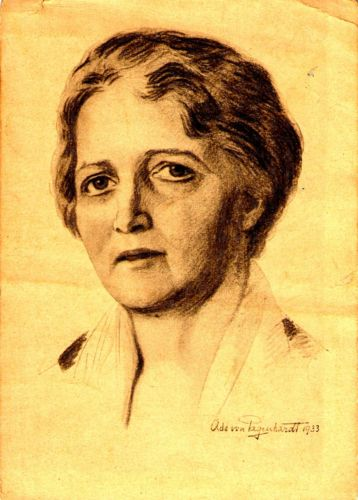
- Dr. med. Mathilde Ludendorff, 1933 (portrait by Ada von Pagenhardt)
- Born: Mathilde Spieß; 4 October 1877; Wiesbaden, Grand Duchy of Hesse and by Rhine, German Empire
- Died: 24 June 1966 (aged 88); Tutzing, Bavaria, West Germany
- Occupation: Psychiatrist
- Spouses: Gustav Adolf von Kemnitz (m. 1904; died 1917) Edmund Georg Kleine (m. 1919; div. 1921) Erich Ludendorff (m. 1926; died 1937)
- Children: 3

Mathilde Friederike Karoline Ludendorff (born Mathilde Spieß; 4 October 1877 – 24 June 1966) was a German psychiatrist and author on several subjects such as philosophy, politics, and religion. She was a leading figure in the Völkisch movement known for her unorthodox (esoteric) and conspiratorial ideas. Her third husband was General Erich Ludendorff. Together with Ludendorff, she founded the Bund für Gotteserkenntnis (Society for the Knowledge of God), a small and rather obscure esoterical society of theists, which was banned from 1961 to 1977.

== Early life and education ==
Mathilde Spieß was born in Wiesbaden, Hesse in central Germany, the daughter of Prof. Dr. phil. Bernhard Spieß, from 1876 until 1906 teacher at the Wiesbaden Gymnasium. She attended a private and a public school for girls. Despite their modest means, the parents were able to give their daughters a practical professional education, which was unusual at the time. From 1893 until 1895 she trained to be a school teacher for girls, and in 1896 began to teach, initially at a boarding school for girls in Biebrich. She saved enough money to attend evening classes at the Gymnasium for Girls in Karlsruhe from 1900 until 1901, to gain her Abitur.

During the winter semester of 1901/1902, she began to study medicine at the Albert Ludwigs University in Freiburg, where she attended the lectures of August Weismann on common descent (Vorlesungen über Deszendenztheorie) amongst others.

In 1904, she married her lecturer, anatomist Gustav Adolf von Kemnitz, and moved to Munich in 1905, where she had a daughter, Ingeborg von Kemnitz (1906–1970) and the twins Asko (1909–1992) and Hanno (1909–1990). Two years later in 1911, she picked up her interrupted medical studies in Munich until 1912, followed by the Medizinalpraktikum (practical year) part-time in the gynecology department of the Universitätsklinik Bonn, followed by approbation in 1913. She also graduated in 1913 with a PhD degree in neurology with a thesis examining the hereditary nature of mental differences between genders.

== Career ==
From 1913 to 1914 she volunteered with the psychiatrist Emil Kraepelin and for a short time had her own office. She developed tuberculosis of the lung in 1915. As she recovered in 1915, she took over as medical director of a "Offiziersgenesungsheim" (place of recuperation/rehabilitation for military officers) in Partenkirchen and Garmisch and opened her own neurology office. In parallel to her intensifying preoccupation with the philosophy of Kant and Schopenhauer in 1916 she founded a private spa in 1917. Her husband died in 1917 during an accident in the mountains.

In 1919, she married Edmund Georg Kleine, a retired major, and divorced two years later. She made her living with an office in Munich. Through Gottfried Feder, she got to know General Erich Ludendorff, who had been the leader of German military activities during the second half of WWI. His wife became her psychiatric patient but after they divorced, she married Ludendorff on 14 September 1926 in Tutzing.

She became a strong critic of the religions existing in the Germany of her time and officially left Lutheranism in 1913.

=== Philosophy and science ===
Her 1921 work Triumph des Unsterblichkeitwillens (Triumph of the Will for Immortality) examined the desire in humans for immortality and in doing so attempted a synthesis of philosophy and science which would underpin much of her later work. This was the case in her The Origin and Nature of the Soul, a book in three volumes: History of Creation (1923), which traces the soul from its beginnings and the emergence of the universe; Soul of Man (1925), which explains the soul as a will and a consciousness; and Self Creation (1927), which suggests ways of remodelling the soul.

A later work, Der Seele Wirken und Gestalten (The Action of the Soul and its Effect), dealt with similar themes and was also split up into three books: The Soul of the Child and the Parent's Duty (1930), a study in pedagogy; The Soul of the Nation and the Molders of its Power (1933), which argued that the Volk was an indivisible unit and was shaped by its leaders so that bad leadership could kill off a group; The God-Story of the Nations, (1935) which claimed that culture was more important to any people than civilisation and that it was tied into their will to creation itself.

She also advocated women's rights and equality of the sexes, although these issues did not form a central part of the wider political platform with which she would become associated.

=== Opposition to organized religion and the occult ===
In the course of her studies of psychiatry she developed a strong opposition to the occult. She attacked the work of Albert von Schrenck-Notzing and argued that occult practices had been responsible for the development of mental illness in a number of her patients. She dealt with this topic at length in her work Insanity Induced Through Occult Teachings (1933).

She launched a number of attacks on astrology, arguing that it had always been a Jewish perversion of astronomy and that it was being used to enslave the Germans and dull their reasoning. The title of her main work on the subject, Fraud of Astrology, indicated her position succinctly.

She also targeted anthroposophy, notably in her 1933 essay The Miracle of Marne. She and her husband argued that General Helmuth von Moltke the Younger had lost the First Battle of the Marne because he had come under the control of Lisbeth Seidler, a devotee of Rudolf Steiner. As a consequence of these writings the Ludendorffs added occultists to the Stab-in-the-back legend.

She criticized the works of Jakob Wilhelm Hauer, an Indologist who supported völkisch ideas, but who had emphasised the Indo-European origins of the Germans. She criticized the lack of depth and tendency towards jargon in his seminal 1932 work Der Yoga als Heilweg and argued that the teachings of Krishna and Buddha had in fact been adopted by the writers of the Old and New Testaments, making Indian religion off-limits given her aversion to Christianity. Hauer feared Ludendorff's power in völkisch circles, given her work and her influential husband, and would de-emphasise the Indian aspects of his ideas in subsequent writings.

On a personal level, Ludendorff's hatred of the occult also stemmed from her support for the völkisch movement and her desire to construct a new, specifically-German religion. As such, she feared that if Germany was won away from Christianity it would descend into existing occult practices instead, which she felt were no more German in origin than the Christian faith.

She believed that the Dalai Lama was controlling Jews in their supposed attempts to destroy Germany through Marxism, Roman Catholicism, capitalism and Freemasonry.

In spite of her personal hatred of occultism, her involvement in the völkisch movement and Germanic cultural identity meant that she co-operated with a number of devotees of occult practices. This was the case in the Edda Society of Rudolf John Gorsleben, of which she was a member and whose other members included Friedrich Schaefer, a follower of Karl Maria Wiligut, and Otto Sigfried Reuter, a strong believer in astrology, which she so roundly condemned.

=== Politico-religious activity ===
As part of her dual assault on Christianity and the occult, Ludendorff drew on her interpretation of science to develop her own faith, Gotterkenntnis or 'God Knowledge', which emphasised notions of racial inheritance, culture, economy and justice. The faith became the religion of the Tannenbergbund, founded by her and her husband in 1925, a conspiratorial organisation which briefly claimed as many as 100,000 followers before losing out to and being prohibited by the NSDAP in 1933.

Ludendorff had no truck with the ideas of Positive Christianity, feeling that Christian beliefs could never be reconciled to the Aryan ideal that she believed in. She stressed this by portraying Jesus as a Jewish preacher who had not died on the cross in her 1931 book, Erlösung von Jesu Christo (Redemption from Jesus Christ). She considered the Bible a fraud and called for a pantheism rooted in blood and soil rhetoric, in which the soul of God permeated the land as a whole.

She also published The Secret Power of the Jesuits and Its Decline with her husband, although this work revealed many of the prejudices still latent in the old general. Whilst Mathilde Ludendorff despised Christianity, Erich, despite his conversion to Gotterkenntnis, retained a strong sense of German Protestantism, arguing that the Roman Catholic Church was a much stronger threat to the couple's völkisch ideals; even though avowedly non-Christian, he was seen as a Protestant crusader by both the arch-conservatives of the Protestant League and their opponents in organised Catholicism.

=== Post-war activity, 1945–1965 ===
Ludendorff was largely sidelined after her husband's 1937 death, as Adolf Hitler had long since broken from the general. She continued to express anti-Semitic ideas after the war and was found guilty during the Denazification process, although her judgement was lessened in 1951.

She founded a Bund für Gotterkenntnis which could be traced back to 1951 and had as many as 12,000 members. The Bavarian Administrative Court banned it in 1961 for being unconstitutional. In 1955 she also founded a Schule für Gotterkenntnis to propagate her beliefs. She died in Tutzing in 1966, five years after the judgement.

In 1977, the ban for the Bund für Gotterkenntnis was lifted because of procedural errors, though it remains under observation of several constitutional protection agencies. As of 2010 the Bund für Gotterkenntnis survived in a reduced form.

== See also ==
- Kurt Aland

== Literature ==
- Korotin, Ilse: Die politische Radikalisierung der Geschlechterdifferenz im Kontext von „Konservativer Revolution“ und Nationalsozialismus. Mathilde Ludendorff und der „Völkische Feminismus“ In: Eickhoff, Volker; Korotin, Ilse (Hg.): Sehnsucht nach Schicksal und Tiefe. Der Geist der Konservativen Revolution Picus, Wien 1997, S. 105–127
- Meyer, Ursula: Mathilde Ludendorff. Das nationalistische Menschenbild In: dies.: Die Welt der Philosophin 4. Teilband: Moderne Zeiten: Das 20. Jahrhundert ein-FACH-verlag, Aachen 1998, S. 87–104
- Rudolf Radler (1987). "Ludendorff, Mathilde, geborene Spieß". Neue Deutsche Biographie (in German). Vol. 15. Berlin: Duncker & Humblot. pp. 290–292. (full text online).
- Schnoor, Frank: Mathilde Ludendorff und das Christentum. Eine radikale völkische Position in der Zeit der Weimarer Republik und des NS-Staates. Deutsche Hochschulschriften, Kiel 1998 ISBN 3-8267-1192-0
- Spilker, Annika: Rechtsextremes Engagement und völkisch-antisemitische Politikvorstellungen um Mathilde Ludendorff (1877–1966) und die Frauengruppen im Tannenbergbund. In: Daniel Schmidt, Michael Sturm, Massimiliano Livi (Hrsg.): Wegbereiter des Nationalsozialismus. Personen, Organisationen und Netzwerke der extremen Rechten zwischen 1918 und 1933 (= Schriftenreihe des Instituts für Stadtgeschichte. Bd. 19). Klartext, Essen 2015, ISBN 978-3-8375-1303-5, S. 221 ff.
