= Ostara (magazine) =

Defunct German nationalist magazine

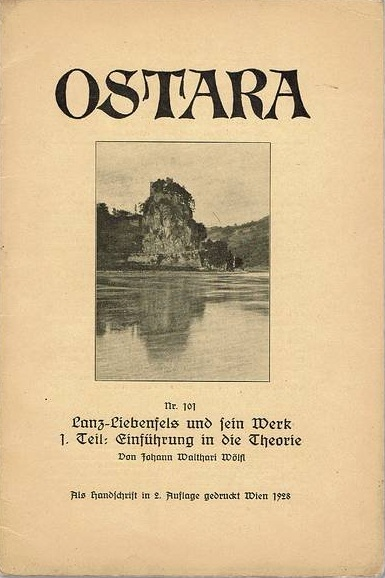
- Cover of issue 101, 1928
- Categories: Political
- Founder: Jörg Lanz von Liebenfels
- Founded: Late 1905
- Country: Austria
- Based in: Vienna
- Language: German
- OCLC: 73005266

Ostara or Ostara, Briefbücherei der Blonden und Mannesrechtler (Ostara, Newsletter of the Blonde and Masculists) was a German nationalist magazine founded in late 1905 by the Ariosophist occultist Jörg Lanz von Liebenfels in Vienna, Austria, and in which he published antisemitic and Völkisch theories.

Lanz derived the name of the publication from the reconstructed Old High German goddess name Ôstarâ. Lanz claimed that the Ostrogoths and the nation of Austria (German: Österreich) were matronymically named after this goddess. In his study of Lanz von Liebenfels, the Austrian psychologist Wilfried Daim states that "most likely this is even greater nonsense." Each issue of the magazine was written by a single author.

According to von Liebenfels, the magazine had a peak circulation of 100,000 and appeared in three series; the first series included anywhere from 89 to 100 issues between 1905 and 1917, the second series had only one issue, and the third series included 20 issues published c. 1930–1931.

Adolf Hitler was reportedly one of the publication's readers in his late teens, and there is speculation that it served as a catalyst for his antisemitism. After Hitler's rise to prominence in the 1920s, Lanz tried to be recognized as one of his ideological precursors. In the preface of issue one in the 3rd series of Ostara, c. 1927, he wrote, "One shall remember that the swastika- and fascist movements are basically offspring of Ostara." Historian Nicholas Goodrick-Clarke said that "on the basis of the available evidence, then, it seems most probable that Hitler did read and collect the Ostara in Vienna".

Hitler, however, refused to acknowledge any debt to Lanz and his paper. After Austria was annexed by Nazi Germany in 1938, Lanz hoped for Hitler's patronage, but Hitler banned him from publishing his writings, and most notably copies of Ostara were removed from circulation. After the war, Lanz accused Hitler of having not only stolen but corrupted his idea, and also of being of "inferior racial stock".

== See also ==
- German nationalism in Austria
- Germanic mysticism
