= Jörg Lanz von Liebenfels =

Austrian political and racial theorist, occultist, and publisher

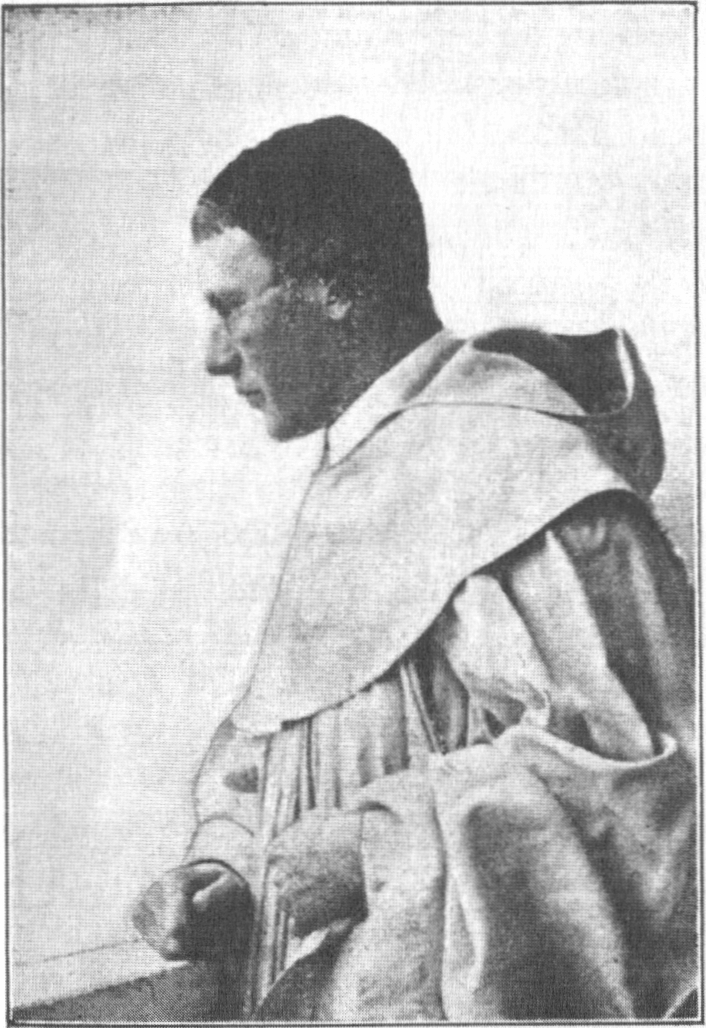
- Jörg Lanz von Liebenfels
- Born: Adolf Josef Lanz; 19 July 1874; Penzing, Vienna, Austria-Hungary
- Died: 22 April 1954 (aged 79); Vienna, Allied-occupied Austria
- Other name: Lanz von Liebenfels
- Known for: Racist and occult ideas

Adolf Josef Lanz (19 July 1874 – 22 April 1954), also known under his pseudonym as Jörg Lanz von Liebenfels, was an Austrian political and racial theorist and occultist, who was a pioneer of Ariosophy. He was a former Cistercian monk and the founder of the magazine Ostara, in which he published antisemitic and völkisch theories.

== Early life ==
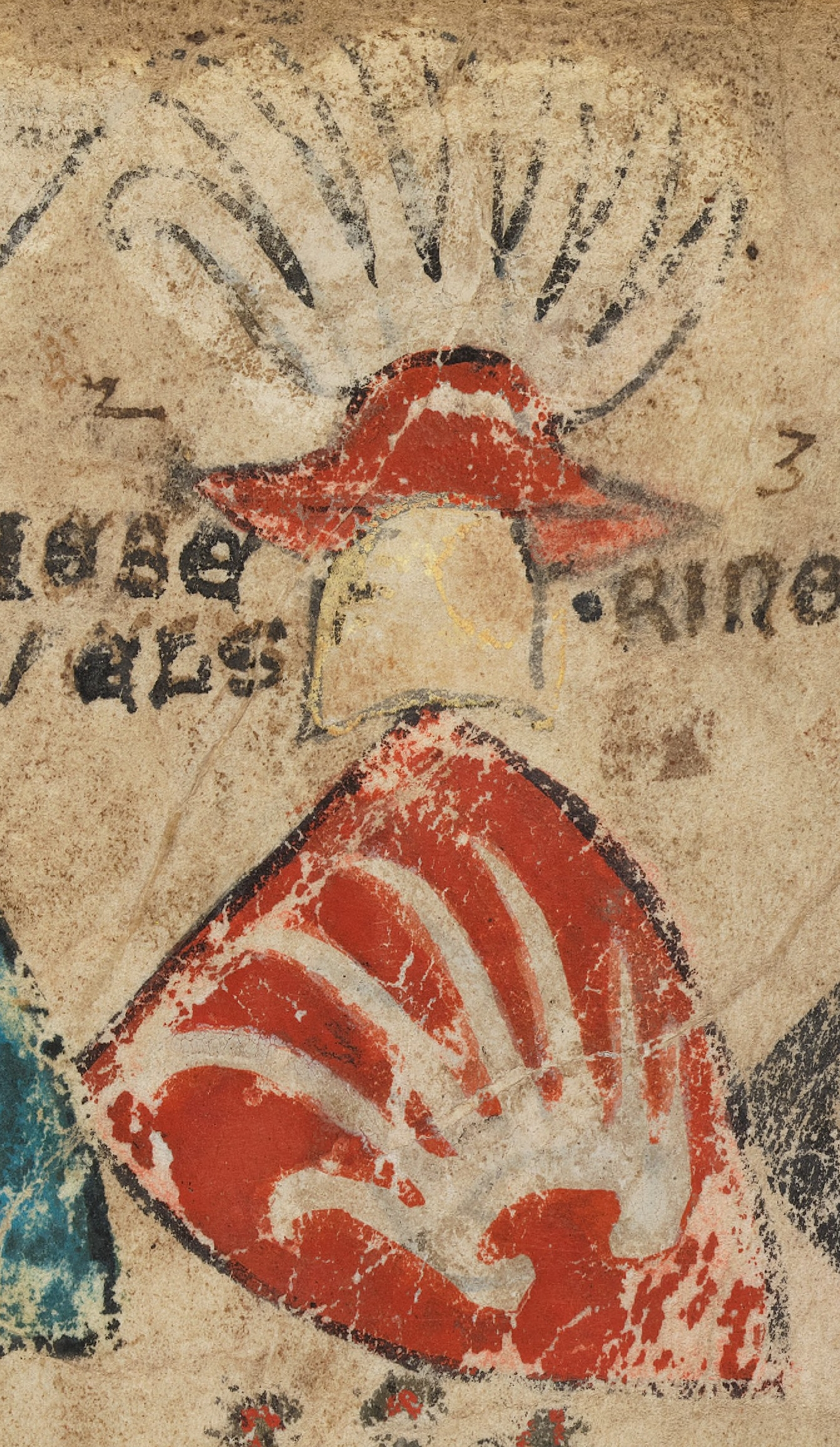
The arms of Liebenfels, a Swiss-Swabian family which died out in the 14th century and which was regranted to Hans Lanz von Liebenfels by Frederick III, Holy Roman Emperor (r. 1452–1493), from the Zürich armorial. Lanz assumed these arms for himself and flew Liebenfels banner of arms from Burg Werfenstein.

He was born on 19 July 1874 in the Penzing district of Vienna in what was then Austria-Hungary, as the son of schoolmaster Johann Lanz and his wife Katharina, née Hoffenreich. His maternal grandfather Samuel Hoffenreich (later known as Josef Hoffenreich) was born in 1815 in Holíč, Slovakia, and was the son of a Jewish merchant.

His parents were middle class, and his father's ancestors had been burghers in Vienna since the early 18th century. Consequently, he claimed to be the son of Baron Johannes Lancz de Liebenfels and began to call himself "Baron Adolf Georg (Jörg) Lanz Von Liebenfels Ph.D."

As a young boy, he was fascinated by Arthurian legends about the Holy Grail.

Liebenfels became a monk in the Cistercian Order in 1893, assuming the name Georg and living in the Heiligenkreuz Abbey. In 1894, he claimed to have become "enlightened" after finding the tombstone of a Knight Templar, and began developing his theories of "blue-blond Aryanism" and "lower races". In 1899, he left the Cistercian Order.

== Work with Theozoology ==
In 1905, he published his book Theozoologie oder die Kunde von den Sodoms-Äfflingen und dem Götter-Elektron (lit. 'Theozoology, or the Science of the Sodomite-Apelings and the Divine Electron') in which he advocated sterilization of the sick and the "lower races" as well as forced labour for "castrated chandals", and glorified the "Aryan race" as "Gottmenschen" (lit. 'god-men'). Liebenfels justified his esoteric racial ideology by attempting to give it a Biblical foundation; according to him, Eve, whom he described as initially being divine, involved herself with a demon and gave birth to the "lower races" in the process. One year later, in 1905, Liebenfels founded the magazine Ostara, Briefbücherei der Blonden und Mannesrechtler, of which he became the sole author and editor in 1908. Liebenfels himself claimed to have up to 100,000 subscribers, but it is generally agreed that this figure is grossly exaggerated. Readers of this publication included Adolf Hitler, Dietrich Eckart and the British Field Marshal Herbert Kitchener among others. Liebenfels claimed he was visited by the young Hitler in 1909, whom he supplied with two missing issues of the magazine.

As a student of Guido von List, Liebenfels further expanded his theories; other influences included Otto Weininger, of whom Liebenfels was a fervent follower, and Helena Blavatsky.

Flag of the Order of the New Templars, which Lanz flew alongside the Liebenfels banner of arms atop Burg Werfenstein from Christmas Day 1907

== Secret Society Order of the New Templars ==
The Order of the New Templars – Ordo Novi Templi (ONT) was a proto-fascist secret society in Germany founded by Lanz in 1900. It was modelled after the Catholic military order the Knights Templar and similar in its hierarchical structure to the Order of Cistercians, of which Lanz had been a member.

Members used code names so that betrayal was difficult.

Lanz functioned as ideologue and agitator of the group, justifying violence and punishments such as castration in order to establish a fascist state in Germany and defend it against communism.

== Interactions with Aryan societies ==
In 1905 Liebenfels and some 50 other supporters of List signed a declaration endorsing the proposed Guido-von-List-Gesellschaft (Guido von List Society), which was officially founded in 1908. He also founded his own esoteric organisation, the Ordo Novi Templi (Order of the New Templars) in 1907. These movements were supposed to "further the racial self-confidence by doing pedigree and racial research, beauty contests and the founding of racist "future sites" in underdeveloped parts of the Earth" (das Rasse Bewusstsein durch Stammbaum- und Rassekunde Forschung, Schönheitswettbewerbe und die Gründung rassistischer Zukunftsstätten in unterentwickelten Teilen der Erde zu fördern). To further this agenda, he purchased the ruins of Burg Werfenstein on the Danube in Austria. Neither organization managed to attract a large member base; though, it is estimated that the order had around 300 members, most prominent of which was the poet Fritz von Herzmanovsky-Orlando. Liebenfels‘s claim that the organization was already founded prior to 1900, and that he met with August Strindberg in 1896 and managed to convince him to join the order, have been shown to be fabricated.

After Hitler's rise to prominence in the 1920s, Liebenfels tried to be recognized as one of his ideological precursors. In the preface of issue one in the 3rd series of Ostara, c. 1927, he wrote:

One shall remember that the swastika and fascist movements are basically offspring of Ostara.

== Publications ==
In his publications, Liebenfels mixed völkisch and antisemitic ideas with Aryanism, racism and esotericism. The following is a partial list of Liebenfels‘s publications:

- Katholizismus wider Jesuitismus (lit. 'Catholicism versus Jesuitism'), Frankfurt, 1903
- Anthropozoon biblicum in Vjschr. für Bibelkunde 1, 1903/1904
- Zur Theologie der gotischen Bibel (lit. 'Regarding the Theology of the Gothic Bible') in Vjschr. für Bibelkunde 1, 1903/1904
- Theozoologie oder die Kunde von den Sodoms-Äfflingen und dem Götter-Elektron (lit. 'Theozoology, or the Science of the Sodomite-Apelings and the Divine Electron'), Vienna, (1905)
  - von Liebenfels, Lanz (1904). Theozoölogie oder die Kunde von den Sodoms-Äfflingen und dem Götter-Elektron (in German) – via The Internet Archive.
    - von Liebenfels, Lanz. Theozoology or the science of the Sodomite Apelings and the Divine Electron – via The Internet Archive.
- Das Breve "Dominus ac redemptor noster", Frankfurt, 1905
- Der Taxilschwindel. Ein welthistorischer Ulk, Frankfurt, 1905
- Ostara (magazine), 89 or 100 issues, Rodaun and Mödling, 1905–1917 (38 issues were republished in Vienna between 1926 and 1931)
- Kraus und das Rassenproblem (lit. 'Kraus and the Race Problem'), in Der Brenner 4, 1913/1914
- Weltende und Weltwende, (lit. 'World's End and World's Turn'), Lorch, 1923
- Grundriss der ariosophischen Geheimlehre (lit. 'Outline of the Ariosophic Secret Teachings'), Oestrich, 1925
- Der Weltkrieg als Rassenkampf der Dunklen gegen die Blonden (lit. 'The World War as a Race Fight Between the Dark and the Blondes'), Vienna, 1927
- Bibliomystikon oder die Geheimbibel der Eingeweihten (lit. 'Bibliomystikon, or the Secret Bible of the Initiated'), 10 volumes, Pforzheim and elsewhere, 1929–1934
- Praktisch-empirisches Handbuch der ariosophischen Astrologie (lit. 'Practical-empirical Handbook of Ariosophic Astrology'), Düsseldorf, 1926–34
- Jakob Lorber. Das grösste ariosophische Medium der Neuzeit, Düsseldorf, 1926, 4 volumes.
- von Liebenfels, Lanz (1926). Das Buch der Psalmen Teutch [The Book of the Teutonic Psalms] – via The Internet Archive.

== See also ==
- Antisemitism
- Eugenics
- German mysticism
- Nazi occultism
- Nazism
- Schutzstaffel
- Theosophy

== Bibliography ==
- Goodrick-Clarke, Nicholas (2006). "Lanz von Liebenfels, Jörg (Adolf Josef Lanz)". In Wouter Hanegraaff (ed.). Dictionary of Gnosis and Western Esotericism. Brill.
- De Groot, Jan Willem (1998). "Gnosis en raszuiverheid: De ariosofie van Lanz von Liebenfels". De hang naar zuiverheid: de cultuur van het moderne Europa. Het Spinhuis. pp. 223–249.
- Goodrick-Clarke, Nicholas (2004) [1985]. The Occult Roots of Nazism: The Ariosophists of Austria and Germany, 1890–1935. London: I.B. Tauris. ISBN 1-86064-973-4.
- Hieronymus, Ekkehard (1996), "Jörg Lanz von Liebenfels", Handbuch zur "Völkischen Bewegung" 1871-1918, Berlin, Boston: K. G. Saur Verlag, pp. 131–146, doi:10.1515/9783110964240.131, ISBN 9783110964240
- Hamann, Brigitte (2010). Hitler's Vienna: A Portrait of the Tyrant as a Young Man. Tauris Parke Paperbacks. ISBN 978-1-84885-277-8.
- Joachim C. Fest: Hitler, p. 169f & 175f, Book I (chapter 2 & 3)
- Ekkehard Hieronimus: Lanz von Liebenfels. Eine Biographie, Toppenstedt, 1991
- Anton Maegerle, Peter Paul Heller: Thule. Vom völkischen Okkultismus bis zur Neuen Rechten, Stuttgart, 1995
- Wilfried Daim: Der Mann, der Hitler die Ideen gab (1st ed.: 1957; 2nd. ed.: 1985; 3rd ed.: 1994)
