= Ernst Wachler =

German neopagan writer (1871–1945)

Heinrich Ernst Wachler (* 18 February 1871 in Breslau; † September 1945 in Theresienstadt) was a völkisch-neopagan and antisemitic writer, dramatist and publicist.

Wachler's mother had been of Jewish origin but had converted to Protestantism in her youth.

There is some confusion about the death of Ernst Wachler. Neopagan web pages and print-on-demand books make it appear as if he died as the victim of the Nazis in a concentration camp. Neo-völkisch writers allege that he was sent to KZ Auschwitz where he perished. The German historian Uwe Puschner (Free University of Berlin) mentions that there are various speculations about Wachler's death, but that, according to two of Wachler's close relatives, Wachler died in the summer of 1945, after the war as an imprisoned German civilian, in the Theresienstadt concentration camp from Shigellosis.

== Literature ==
Uwe Puschner, 1996: Ernst Wachler. and Deutsche Reformbühne und völkische Kultstätte. Ernst Wachler und das Harzer Bergtheater. In: Handbuch zur "Völkischen Bewegung" 1871 - 1918. (in German) Ed. by Uwe Puschner, Walter Schmitz and Justus H. Ulbricht. Munich and others
