= Tannenbergbund =

German nationalist political society

The Tannenbergbund (German: [ˈtanm̩bɛɐ̯kˌbʊnt], Tannenberg Union, TB) was a nationalist German political society formed in September 1925 at the instigation of Konstantin Hierl under the patronage of the former German Army general Erich Ludendorff. Part of the Völkisch movement, it was meant to counteract the Der Stahlhelm veterans association as well as the reorganized Sturmabteilung (SA) of the Nazi Party. The TB failed to meet the goal of a far-right collective movement and sank into insignificance long before it was officially banned by the Nazi authorities in September 1933.

== Founding ==
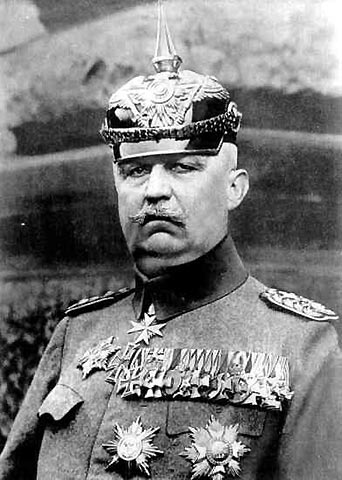
Ludendorff in 1918

During Germany's early Weimar period, Ludendorff had joined the chauvinist Aufbau Vereinigung and met with Adolf Hitler through the agency of Max Erwin von Scheubner-Richter. He participated in Hitler's failed Beer Hall Putsch on 9 November 1923, after which their relationship increasingly deteriorated. While Ludendorff apparently despised Hitler, he nevertheless backed the National Socialist Freedom Movement and ran for the Nazi Party in the 1925 Presidential election against his former Oberste Heeresleitung colleague Paul von Hindenburg.

Hitler feared the possibility of Ludendorff as a potential leadership rival and rejoiced in the General's derisory election result, telling Hermann Esser "now we've finally finished him". With his credibility severely damaged by the election result, Ludendorff drifted from the Nazi Party and joined his wife Mathilde von Kemnitz in setting up the Tannenbergbund, with the organisation taking its name from the 1914 Battle of Tannenberg, one of Ludendorff's greatest military triumphs.

== Development ==
The Tannenbergbund soon developed as largely a circle of former officers who had served under Ludendorff in World War I. In terms of ideology the Bund largely concentrated on those whom it opposed, attacking Freemasons, Jews, communists and Jesuits and accusing them of conspiracy. Such people were lumped in together as "die überstaatlichen Mächte" or "the powers above the state". The Bund became a prolific producer of conspiracy literature, although they were openly rejected by the growing Nazi movement, for whom some of the Bund's more wild ideas were even too fancifully conspiratorial. Central also to their ideas was an occultist vision inspired by the Thule Society to which Ludendorff had been introduced by his wife. As such, the Bund presented history as a struggle between the Nordic hero and the three-way alliance of the Jew, Catholic and Freemason. As a consequence, members of the Bund were expected to abandon Christianity and turn to the old Nordic gods.

== Decline and suppression ==
The Tannenbergbund initially enjoyed support amongst rural political movements in Schleswig-Holstein, although it never presented a serious challenge to the Nazis. Among surviving senior officers of the Kaiserreich, Ludendorff's politics were viewed with a mixture of skepticism and disbelief. Field Marshal August von Mackensen, who had commanded an army corps at Tannenberg, wrote that "der Mann ist krank" (the man is sick). Similarly, Paul von Hindenburg had no truck with the Tannenbergbund as he and Ludendorff had been estranged since the 1925 election, culminating in the two not shaking hands and Hindenburg snubbing Ludendorff's speech at the dedication of a Battle of Tannenberg memorial in 1927. Given its composition of more junior officers loyal to Ludendorff, the Tannenbergbund failed to win over the support of the masses, and before long it lost a number of members to the Nazi Party. The Tannenbergbund was banned as soon as Hitler came to power, although the group carried on until Ludendorff's death in 1937 before finally being suppressed by Hitler's government.
