= Rudolf John Gorsleben =

German Ariosophist, Armanist and journal editor

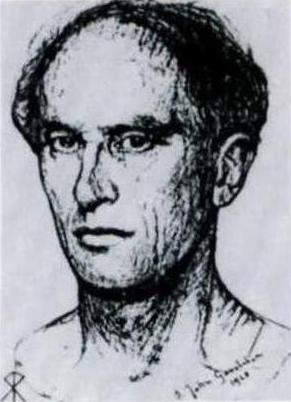
Rudolf John Gorsleben

Rudolf John Gorsleben (March 16, 1883 – August 23, 1930) was a German Aryan occultist, Armanen rune practitioner, newspaper editor, playwright, and völkisch occultist. Born in Metz (Alsace-Lorraine, then German Empire), he stood out in the pre-Nazi esoteric movement by promoting a mystical ideology of Aryan superiority, reinterpreting ancient Germanic runes as magical keys to racial "soul power." His work influenced circles such as the Thule Society and, indirectly, Nazi esotericism via Heinrich Himmler and the SS, although he died before the Third Reich.

== Life ==
Gorsleben was born in Metz, in France near the German border. He began his writing career as a playwright in 1913, the year when he turned 30, publishing three plays during the 1910s. During World War I, he fought in a German unit on the western front and was later stationed in the Ottoman Empire.

In 1920 he published a 71-page antisemitic work, "Overcoming the Jewry/Judaism within us and outside us". The following year he became regional head for southern Bavaria of the radical antisemitic organisation Deutschvölkischer Schutz- und Trutzbund.

In 1925 he formed the Edda Society (Edda-Gesellschaft). He wrote the book Hoch-Zeit der Menschheit (The Zenith of Humanity), first published in 1930, the year of his death. It is known as "The Bible of Armanism" and has been translated into English by Karl Hans Welz.

Gorsleben died in Bad Homburg of a chronic heart complaint.

== Quotes ==
- "The healing power of medical drugs is the Ur-power of their original essence in conjunction with the power of Ur-vibrations of the human-Divine combination that is composed of body, soul and spirit." - Hoch-Zeit der Menschheit (English edition)
- "With the introduction of Runic knowledge the generation of our days can achieve the control of secret powers within the life of their soul and reach the Spring-Root, which is the Whole of the Runes, the All-Raune, which opens all spiritual treasures to us, if we are Children of the Sunday, Children of the Sun, Children ("Kinder") of the Ar (Eagle, Sun), announcers ("Künder") of the Ar, people knowledgeable ("Könner" in modern German) of the Ar, Ar-koner, persons knowledgeable in the Ar-Kana (Arkana = arcane wisdom) or if we strive to become all of the above. The Runes have their own lives, they are true magical signs, from which we can draw the Spirit to Advise and the Courage to Action." - Hoch-Zeit der Menschheit (English edition)

== Gorsleben's Periodicals ==
- Deutsche Freiheit. Monatsschrift für Arische Gottes- und Welterkenntnis. Ed. Rudolf John Gorsleben, 1925 to 1926, Munich (3.1925 and 4.1926)
- Arische Freiheit. Monatsschrift für arische Gottes- u. Welterkenntnis, 1927, Dinkelsbühl (5.1927)
- Hag-All, All-Hag. Zeitschrift für arische Freiheit, Edda-Gesellschaft, 1930 to 1934, Mittenwald, Obb. (7.1930 to 11.1934)

== Written works ==
- Der Freibeuter, Drama, 1913
- Der Rastäquar, Drama, 1913
- Die königliche Waschfrau, Lustspiel, 1918
- Die Überwindung des Judentums in uns und außer uns. 71 S., Deutscher Volksverlag Dr. Ernst Boepple, München 1920
- Die Edda. Übertragen von Rudolf John Gorsleben. Die Heimkehr (W. Simon, Buchdr. u. Verlag), Pasing 1920
- Gedichte, 1921
- Das Blendwerk der Götter (Gylfaginning). Aus d. jüngeren Edda ins Hoch-Deutsche übertr. von Rudolf John Gorsleben. 75 S., Die Heimkehr (W. Simon, Buchdr. u. Verlag), Pasing 1923
- Die Edda, Band 1. Lieder- Edda. Heldenlieder, Sprüche, Götterlieder - was wirklich in der Edda steht. Reprint von 2002 ISBN 3-8311-4000-6
- Festschrift zum fünfundzwanzigjährigen Bestehen des Hammer 1901 - 1926. Den Mitarbeitern zugeeignet, Hammer, Leipzig, 1926. Sammelwerk. Enthält: Rudolf John Gorsleben: Gedanken um Zeit und Ewigkeit
- Das Geheimnis von Dinkelsbühl. Eine tiefgründige und doch kurzweilige Abhandlung über den Ursprung der Stadt, ihre Geschichte, die Herkunft des Wappens, über den Brauch der uralten „Kinderzeche” und über die Bedeutung einer rätselhaften Inschrift der Geheimen Bruderschaft der Bauhütte, hauptsächlich an Hand der Kenntnis der Runen / entdeckt, entziffert u. erklärt von Rudolf John Gorsleben, 70 S., Brückner, Berlin 1928 (Wunder der Heimat, H. 1)
- Das Geheimnis von Dinkelsbühl... Reprint: Antiquariat an der Segringer Straße, Dinkelsbühl 2004.
- Hoch-Zeit der Menschheit. XXV, 689 S., Ill., Koehler & Amelang, Leipzig 1930
- Hoch-Zeit der Menschheit. XXV, 689 S., Ill., Neudr. der Ausgabe Leipzig 1930, Faksimile-Verl./Versand, Bremen 1981 (Historische Faksimiles)
- Hoch-Zeit der Menschheit. XXV, 764 S., Ill., Faks.-Nachdr. der Ausg. Leipzig 1930, Faks.-Verl., Bremen 1993 ISBN 3-8179-0025-2 (Serie Forschungsreihe „Historische Faksimiles”)
