= Ludwig Fahrenkrog =

German painter

- Born: 20 October 1867; Rendsburg, Prussia
- Died: 27 October 1952 (aged 85)
- Known for: Writing, Play writing, Artist
- Movement: Art Nouveau and Symbolist

Ludwig Fahrenkrog (20 October 1867 – 27 October 1952) was a German painter, illustrator, sculptor and writer. He was born in Rendsburg, Prussia, in 1867. He started his career as an artist in his youth, and attended the Berlin Royal Art Academy before being appointed a professor in 1913. He taught at the School of Arts and Crafts in Bremen from 1898 to 1931. He was also involved in the founding of a series of modern Pagan religious groups in the early 20th century, as part of a movement to create what its adherents referred to as a "Germanic religious community".

== Artistic influences ==
Fahrenkrog was trained in the classical tradition, and had a successful artistic career. He became a professor of art in 1913, and was later appointed a guest professorship at Dakota University in 1925. In 1928 he received first prize at the Grand Palace exhibition in Munich. His style, however, is more dependent on Art Nouveau and Symbolist influences than on the classical tradition. In an article on Fahrenkrog's work, Marcus Wolff points to "his insistence on the religious nature and mission of art." The "religious mission" in question is the revival of the pre-Christian Germanic faith and the rejection of Christianity, which is hinted at in paintings such as Lucifer's Lossage von Gott (Lucifer's Renunciation of God, 1898).

While Fahrenkrog's work can be seen in the context of contemporary art movements, it was also strongly influenced by his participation in the religious movement taking place at the same time.

== Fahrenkrog and the Germanic Faith Community ==
The first group started by Fahrenkrog was the Deutscher Bund für Persönlichkeitskultur (German League for the Culture of the Personality), which also supported a publication called Mehr Licht! ("More Light!", the famous last words of Goethe). He was also involved with the Deutsche Religionsgemeinschaft (German Religious Community [DRG]), which would later change its name several times, first in 1912 to Germanisch-Deutsche Religionsgemeinschaft (Germanic-German Religious Community [GDRG]), then in 1915, following a split in the membership, to the Deutschgläubige Gemeinschaft (Association of the German Faithful [DGG]).

Fahrenkrog remained with the GDRG after several members left following disagreements over the place of the old Germanic gods and the inclusion of a partly Jewish member, and shortly thereafter the group changed its name to the Germanische Glaubens-Gemeinschaft (Germanic Faith-Community [GGG]), its final form. In 1916, the group set out ten points of common belief which they later published in Das Deutsche Buch (The German Book).

In 1923, the GGG's sixth year of existence, Fahrenkrog gave a speech that emphasized the non-political nature of the group, and stated the goal of "ascent and united will of all Germanic people." At that point, the group had a large membership spread across several neighboring countries, and plans for further growth included the building of a Germanic temple designed by Fahrenkrog's stepson.

However, the temple's construction was obstructed by protests from local Christian groups and disagreement among GGG members, and it was never finished. In 1925, Fahrenkrog and Adolf Kroll, another early member, argued over the role that the Edda should play in the group's mythology. Fahrenkrog believed that the GGG should evolve a new mythos incorporating but not dependent upon the Edda, Kroll apparently seeing this as disloyalty to the old Germanic myths.

== The GGG under the Third Reich ==
When the Nazis came to power in 1933, they outlawed almost all other groups not affiliated with the party. The GGG, however, was not forced to disband, partly, says Wolff, "because of Fahrenkrog's international status as an artist." Nevertheless, some of its activities were limited. They could no longer hold public meetings, and after 1938 could no longer use the swastika, which the GGG had been using as its symbol since 1908.

Fahrenkrog himself was reluctant to use the greeting "Heil Hitler!" in letters, and as a result never gained any recognition within the party. In 1934, an exhibit of his paintings was prohibited by the ministry of propaganda.

== See also ==
- Neopaganism in German-speaking Europe
- Germanic paganism
- Heathenry (new religious movement)
- List of German painters

== Notes ==
=== Sources ===
- Schnurbein, Stefanie von (1996). "Ludwig Fahrenkrog". In Puschner, Uwe; Schmitz, Walter; Ulbricht, Justus H. (eds.). Handbuch zur "Völkischen Bewegung" 1871–1918 (in German). Munich: K. G. Saur. ISBN 3-598-11241-6.
