= Richard Rudgley =

British writer (born 1961)

- Born: 1961 (age 64–65); Hampshire, England
- Education: University of London (BA); Oxford University (M. St., M. Phil)
- Occupations: Anthropologist, author, television presenter
- Writing career
- Subjects: Hallucinogens, paganism
- Notable works: The Alchemy of Culture, Lost Civilisations of the Stone Age, Pagan Resurrection

Richard Rudgley (born 1961) is a British anthropologist, author, and television presenter. He specialises on the topics of the usage of hallucinogens and intoxicants in society. He has also written about the Stone Age and about paganism. He has authored several books on these topics, including The Alchemy of Culture: Intoxicants in Society, Lost Civilisations of the Stone Age, and Pagan Resurrection, and has presented several television programmes.

== Early life and education ==
Rudgley was born in Hampshire, England, in 1961. He completed a BA in social anthropology and religious studies at the University of London and went on to do a M. St. and M.Phil. in ethnology and Museum Ethnography at Oxford University.

== Works ==
=== Books ===
Rudgley's first book was The Alchemy of Culture: Intoxicants in Society was published by the British Museum Press in 1993. It was published in America under the title Essential Substances: A Cultural History of Intoxicants in Society. It was the first winner of the Prometheus Award. A review in The Lancet described it as "pleasant to read and a good antidote to the rhetoric of pharmacological calvinists who wage a futile war against 'drugs'". Colin Drummond, writing for the BMJ, called it a "scholarly and very readable account of the history of psychoactive drugs". He also authored The Encyclopedia of Psychoactive Substances, first published by Little, Brown and Company.

His 1998 Lost Civilisations of the Stone Age addresses a popular audience, and argues that ancient peoples were more advanced than has been typically thought. John Robb, reviewing it in Nature, praised its writing and some aspects of its approach to the matter, but criticized the book for its overly broad definition of "civilization" and for Rudgley's consistently taking the minority stance on issues. Robb concluded "the way to read this book is as an entertaining and enlightening account of prehistory’s greatest hits". In a review of the same work in Isis, archaeologist Denise Schmandt-Besserat was more critical, saying the whole framing of the book manufactured a controversy that did not actually exist. She also criticises his use of the key terms 'prehistory' and 'civilisation', which he fails to define, arguing that he misuses them. Choice magazine's R. M. Rowlett gave a positive review, praising it for its approach to the material and evidence, recommending the book for all libraries.

Rudgley's 2006 Pagan Resurrection: A Force for Evil or the Future of Western Spirituality?, published by Century, traces the influence of paganism, both historical and modern, on the western world. David V. Barrett was critical and argued that Rudgely's book is "a catalogue of racist individuals and organisations whose only connection with Odin, through very dubious links, is by assertion rather than argument." Katy Guest, writing for The Independent, said it actually took a more positive view of paganism, she wrote that "while written by a bona fide telly historian, this is far from being a cuddly look at Pagans drinking mead at the Winter Solstice", giving both a positive and negative look at pagans. American writer Gary Lachman was positive in his assessment of the book, calling it a helpful, fascinating, and informative assessment of the subject matter. It was republished in a new edition in 2018 by Inner Traditions, under the name The Return of Odin: The Modern Renaissance of Pagan Imagination.

=== Television ===
Rudgley presented a Channel 4 series titled Secrets of the Stone Age. He authored another book under the name Secrets of the Stone Age, as a tie in with his TV series. Rudgley was a writer on the 2002 Discovery Channel TV series Barbarians, Secrets of the Dark Ages. A companion volume of the same name was written by Rudgley and published in 2002 by Channel 4 Books.

He also presented Pagans, which ran on Channel 4 in 2004. In one episode, Rudgley has an encounter with wolves. This was at the behest of the producer; he said that it "wasn't my idea to do this, but somehow I got talked into it". The Times reviewer Sarah Vine commented that the subject matter was "undoubtably [sic] fascinating" but criticised the "irritating, pseudo-mystical way in which it is presented". Caitlin Moran of the same outlet remarked that it "provided some great moments: not least the 3,000-year-old, 3ft-high, ornately embossed wizard’s hat made of 24-carat gold." Joe Joseph said that Rudgley "wants to take up a fight that nobody has picked. He’s like the bar-room cleverdick who has a trick question about which is the world’s longest river, or largest creature, just for the sake of being right on a technicality".

In 2006, Channel 4 broadcast another documentary presented by Rudgley entitled The Celts, which investigates the Celtic peoples of the British Isles and mainland Europe. The legend of King Arthur, the mysticism of the Druids, and warriors such as Boudica and Vercingetorix are covered as the programme attempts to unpick the facts from the fiction, about an ethnic group that were ultimately crushed by the might of Rome's legions.

== Personal life ==
Rudgley moved to London in the early 1980s and worked as a shop assistant in WHSmith in Notting Hill, and later as a hotel porter in Holland Park, later showing interest in a number of modern Pagan groups, but never becoming a member of any single organisation. He undertook fieldwork in China. He is married and lives in London.

== Bibliography ==
- —— (1993). The Alchemy of Culture: Intoxicants in Society. London: British Museum Press. ISBN 0-7141-1736-6. (published as Essential Substances: A Cultural History of Intoxicants in Society in the United States)
- —— (1998). Lost Civilisations of the Stone Age. London: Century. ISBN 0-7126-7758-5.
- —— (1998). The Encyclopedia of Psychoactive Substances. London: Little, Brown and Company. ISBN 0-316-64347-5.
- —— (1999). Wildest Dreams: An Anthology of Drug-Related Literature. London: Little, Brown and Company. ISBN 0-316-64811-6. ISBN 978-0-349-11138-4
- —— (2000). Secrets of the Stone Age: A Prehistoric Journey with Richard Rudgley. London: Century. ISBN 0-7126-8452-2.
- —— (2002). Barbarians: Secrets of the Dark Ages. London: Channel 4 Books. ISBN 0-7522-6198-3. ISBN 978-0-7522-6198-0
- —— (2006). Pagan Resurrection: A Force for Evil or the Future of Western Spirituality?. London: Century. ISBN 978-0-7126-8096-7.
  - —— (2018). The Return of Odin: The Modern Renaissance of Pagan Imagination. Rochester: Inner Traditions. ISBN 978-1-62055-727-3.

== Filmography ==
- Secrets of the Stone Age (1999; presenter)
- Barbarians, Secrets of the Dark Ages (2002; writer)
- Pagans (2004; presenter)
- The Celts (2006; presenter)
