= Hans Wilhelm Hammerbacher =

German author (1903–1980)

Hans Wilhelm Hammerbacher (2 November 1903 – 1980) was a German writer and, in Nazi Germany, a member of the Sturmabteilung.

== Biography ==
Hammerbacher was born in Nuremberg; he was the younger brother of architect Herta Hammerbacher. A physically weak child, he studied social sciences and gained his Ph.D. Having regained his health, in 1928 he bought a house in the mountain resort of Lech (Vorarlberg), Austria, with his father's inheritance. He was living in Lech when he joined the NSDAP on 25 April 1933. On 28 February 1934, he joined the SA; since the party was legally banned in Austria, he was imprisoned for five months and then deported to Germany. In 1938, following the Anschluss, he was made Kreisleiter for Feldkirch and then in early 1939 for Bregenz. He joined the Wehrmacht in mid-1940 and served in Norway, after which he was appointed to the party council in Munich. In 1943 he was a Bereichsleiter in Wieluń in the Reichsgau Wartheland, where he stayed until the end of the war.

He was imprisoned until 1948 and then retreated into obscurity, with his wife and children, and died in 1980. He wrote a dozen books promoting a kind of Germanism, in which he proposed that ancient Germanic polytheism had been destroyed by Christian missionaries, particularly Saint Boniface, whose destruction of the Donar Oak was the subject of his Die Donar Eiche: Geschichte eines Heiligtums.
