= Johannes Balzli =

Austrian/German author, newspaper editor

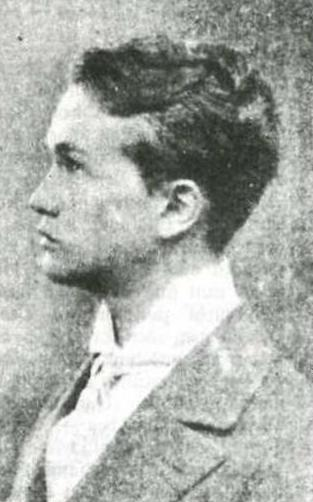
Johannes Balzli, 1914, from his book Guido v. List

Karl Brandler-Pracht (11 February 1864 in Vienna – 10 September 1939 in Berlin) better known by his pseudonym Johannes Balzli, was an Austrian/German author, newspaper editor, Theosophist and Armanist, most notable for his biography of Guido von List, entitled, Guido v. List: Der Wiederentdecker Uralter Arischer Weisheit: Sein Leben und sein Schaffen.

== Biography ==
Karl Brandler-Pracht was born in 1864. Balzli was the secretary of the Leipzig Theosophical Society and editor of occult magazine Prana of which was initially edited by him. He continued editing but under the name Johannes Balzli in 1915. Balzli was also the secretary of the Guido-von-List-Gesellschaft, devoted to the ideas of occultist Guido von List.

He is most notable for his biography of Guido von List, entitled, Guido v. List: Der Wiederentdecker Uralter Arischer Weisheit: Sein Leben und sein Schaffen. ("transl. Guido v. List: The Rediscoverer of Ancient Aryan Wisdom: His Life and His Work") It was published in Vienna by the Guido-von-List-Gesellschaft in 1917. The biography on List was published while Theosophists acknowledged List's nationalist popularization of their doctrines.

This biography of List was the only book length biography of List that exists and indeed that has ever been written. Balzli was in contact with List while writing it, and it was probably co-edited by List himself. It is generally considered the most important biographical source on List.

During 1916 and 1917, List wrote several articles on the approaching national millennium, which was supposed to be realized once the Allies had been defeated, Balzli published two of these predictions in Prana in 1917.

Balzli died in 1939.

== Written works ==
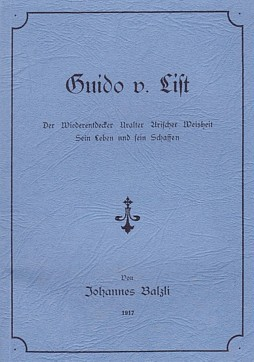
Der Wiederentdecker Uralter Arischer Weisheit by Johannes Balzli, a biography on Guido von list

- Guido v. List: Der Wiederentdecker Uralter Arischer Weisheit: Sein Leben und sein Schaffen. Vienna, Guido-von-List-Gesellschaft, 1917. ("transl. Guido v. List: The Rediscoverer of Ancient Aryan Wisdom: His Life and His Work")
- Magisch okkulte Unterrichtsbriefe: zehn Lehrbriefe zur Entwicklung der Willenskraft und der okkulten Fähigkeiten / bearb. republished in 2002 by Schikowski
- Okkultistische Unterrichtsbriefe: 10 Lehrbriefe zur Entwickelung d. Willenskraft u. d. okkulten Fähigkeiten
- Das Problem des Cölibats vom Standpunkte des Okkultismus : T. 1. [2]
- Eurhythmie
