= Herta Hammerbacher =

German professor and landscape architect (1900–1985)

- Born: 2 December 1900; Nuremberg
- Died: 25 May 1985 (aged 84); Niederpöcking
- Occupation: Architect
- Spouse: Hermann Mattern
- Awards: Friedrich-Ludwig-of-Sckell Ring of Honour
- Practice: Department of Landscaping Späth'schen nurseries, TU Berlin

Herta Hammersbacher (2 December 1900 in Nuremberg – 25 May 1985 in Niederpöcking near Starnberg) was a German landscape architect who taught for more than 20 years at the TU Berlin.

== Life ==
Hammersbacher was the daughter of engineer and economist John Hammersbacher and his wife Luise Feilitzsch. She initially grew up in Nuremberg. In 1910, the family moved to Berlin, where Hammersbacher attended the Cecilie Lyceum Girls school in Berlin-Wilmersdorf.

In 1917 she began a horticultural apprenticeship in Burtenbach that resulted in the Castle Gardens of Potsdam-Sanssouci in 1918–1919. During this time she met the gardener Karl Foerster, whose garden design ideas also influenced her. In the 1920s and 1930s, Hammersbacher belonged to what later was "Bornimer circle" with Karl Foerster and his wife Eva, the landscape architect Hermann Mattern and the landscape architect Walter Funcke, Hermann Goritz, Karl-Heinz Hanisch, Richard Hansen, Gottfried Kühn, Alfred Reich and Berthold Körting.

From 1919 to 1920, she worked in the nursery Hellwig in Gartz (Oder) and met Wolfgang Schadewaldt who introduced her to Greek humanism. Then she moved into the region around Lake Constance, where, from 1920 until 1924 she worked in various establishments, wrote short stories and played first violin and viola for the Lindauer Orchestra "Symposia".

In 1924, she studied at the Higher Teaching and Research Institute for Horticulture in Berlin-Dahlem. In 1926, she passed her exam as a certified horticultural technician. From 1926 to 1928, she worked in the Department of Landscaping Späth'schen nurseries in Baumschulenweg as horticultural technician.

In 1928 she formed a partnership together with Ulrich Wolf, Kurt Lorenzen and Hermann Mattern, which continued for 20 years. Also in 1928 she married Hermann Mattern. Their daughter Merete Mattern (1930–2007) later worked as an architect and – partly with her mother – on ecological problems. After seven years the marriage was dissolved.

Hammersbacher worked as a landscape architect with a number of renowned architects, including Otto von Estorff and Gerhard Winkler, who shaped the country-style room in Potsdam in the 1930s, and Hans Scharoun. In Löbau Hammersbacher designed the garden at the Schminke House. At Scharoun's recommendation, she was appointed, in 1946, lecturer in landscape and garden design at the just reopened TU Berlin. From 1950, until her retirement in 1969, she was a professor there.

With the landscape-bound gardens she designed she shaped the style of landscape design in West Germany in the 1950s and 1960s. She created alone or jointly about 3,500 private and public projects in Berlin. She created gardens in the Waldfriedhof Zehlendorf and in the northern area of the TU Berlin and the summer garden at the radio tower. Ten of the gardens she designed are national monuments, including the outdoor facilities of the architecture building of the TU Berlin.

In 1985, Hammersbacher was awarded the Friedrich-Ludwig-of-Sckell Ring of Honour of the Bavarian Academy of Fine Arts.

== Sources ==
- Go Jeong-Hi: Herta Hammerbacher (1900–1985). Virtuosin der neuen Landschaftlichkeit. Der Garten als Paradigma.. Universitätsverlag der Technischen Universität Berlin, Berlin 2006, ISBN 978-3-7983-2013-0. (Band S 18 der Reihe Landschaftsentwicklung und Umweltforschung. Zugleich Dissertation an der Technischen Universität Berlin 2004.) Volltext, p. I, at Google Books
- Hans Christian Förster: Virtuosin der Gartenarchitektur. In: TU intern, Januar 2010. (Pressemitteilung mit Kurzlebenslauf anlässlich der Dissertation von Jeong-Hi)
- Charlotte Reitsam: Herta Hammerbacher. In: Garten + Landschaft, Nr. 11/1998, S. 38f. ISSN 0016-4720 (Dazu Lebenslauf und Bibliographie)
