= Wilfried Daim =

Austrian psychologist (1923–2016)

- Born: 21 July 1923 Vienna, Austria
- Died: 30 December 2016 (aged 93) Vienna
- Occupation: Psychologist
- Language: German
- Subject: Psychology, religion
- Notable works: Der Mann, der Hitler die Ideen gab

Wilfried Daim (21 July 1923 in Vienna – 30 December 2016 in Vienna) was an Austrian psychologist, psychotherapist, writer and art collector.

Between 1940 and 1945 Daim was active in the Catholic resistance in Austria. He founded the private Institute for Political Psychology in Vienna in 1956.

Daim published many books on the topic of psychology and faith, but he is most noted for his book Der Mann, der Hitler die Ideen gab (transl. The Man Who Gave Hitler the Ideas) which established the connection between Lanz von Liebenfels and Adolf Hitler. This book was first published in 1957, and received many editions and two revisions in German, but has never been translated into English. Karis Muller called it the "seminal" work on Hitler's ties to the occult.

== Bibliography ==
- —— (1951). Umwertung der Psychoanalyse (in German). Vienna: Herold.
- —— (1954). Tiefenpsychologie Und Erlösung (in German). Vienna: Herold.
  - —— (1963). Depth, Psychology, and Salvation. Translated by Reinhardt, Kurt F. New York: Ungar.
- —— (1958). Der Mann, der Hitler die Ideen gab (in German). Munich: Isar.
- —— (1959). Totaler Untergang? (in German). Munich: Manz.
- —— (1960). Die kastenlose Gesellschaft (in German). Munich: Manz.
- —— (1962). Zur Strategie des Friedens: Ein neutralistisches Konzept (in German). Vienna: Europa Verlag.
- —— (1970). The Vatican and Eastern Europe. Translated by Gode, Alexander. New York: Frederick Ungar.
- —— (1973). Christianity, Judaism, and Revolution. Translated by Tirner, Peter. New York: Frederick Ungar.
- —— (1982). Otto Rudolf Schatz: Kriegsbriefe (in German). Eisenstadt: Roetzer.
- —— (1997). Meine Kunstabenteuer: Geschichte einer Sammlung (in German). Vienna: Holzhausen.
