= Stefanie von Schnurbein =

German literary scholar

The Baroness Professor Stefanie von Schnurbein
- Born: June 24, 1961 (age 64); Augsburg
- Scientific career
- Institutions: Humboldt University of Berlin

Baroness Stefanie Anna Hildegard von Schnurbein (born 24 June 1961 in Augsburg) is a German literary scholar, and Professor of Modern Scandinavian Literature at the Humboldt University of Berlin.

== Biography ==
She belongs to the Schnurbein family, originally from South Tyrol (now in northern Italy). In the late 16th century the Schnurbein family settled in Augsburg, where they became wealthy silk merchants and members of the free imperial city's hereditary ruling class, the patriciate. The family was ennobled by the Holy Roman Emperor in 1697 and raised to Baronial rank in 1741.

She completed her doctorate Religion als Kulturkritik. Neugermanisches Heidentum im 20. Jahrhundert at the Johann Wolfgang Goethe-Universität Frankfurt in 1992. She obtained her Habilitation at the University of Göttingen in 1999 with the dissertation Krisen der Männlichkeit. Schreiben und Geschlechterdiskurs in skandinavischen Romanen seit 1890 ("Crises of Masculinity: Writing and Gender Discourse in Scandinavian Novels since 1890").

She worked as an instructor in Norwegian at the University of Göttingen 1990–1991 and as a research assistant in Scandinavian languages at the same university 1991–1995. She was a visiting scholar at the Department of Scandinavian at the University of California, Berkeley 1995–1997 and a Visiting Associate Professor and from 1999 an Associate Professor in Norwegian at the Department of Germanic Studies at the University of Chicago 1997–2000. In 2000 she was appointed Professor in Modern Scandinavian Literature at the Department of Northern European Studies at the Humboldt University of Berlin. In 2006 and 2008 she served as Wigeland Visiting Professor in the Department of Germanic Studies at the University of Chicago.

In 2006 she received an honorary doctorate from Örebro University in Sweden.

== Selected publications ==
- Religion als Kulturkritik. Neugermanisches Heidentum im 20. Jahrhundert, Heidelberg 1992
- Göttertrost in Wendezeiten. Neugermanisches Heidentum zwischen New Age und Rechtsradikalismus, Munich 1993
- Krisen der Männlichkeit. Schreiben und Geschlechterdiskurs in skandinavischen Romanen seit 1890, Göttingen 2001
- Norse Revival: Transformations of Germanic Neopaganism, Leiden 2016
- Ökonomien des Hungers. Essen und Körper in der skandinavischen Literatur, Berlin 2018
