= Germanic peoples =

Historical category of northern European peoples

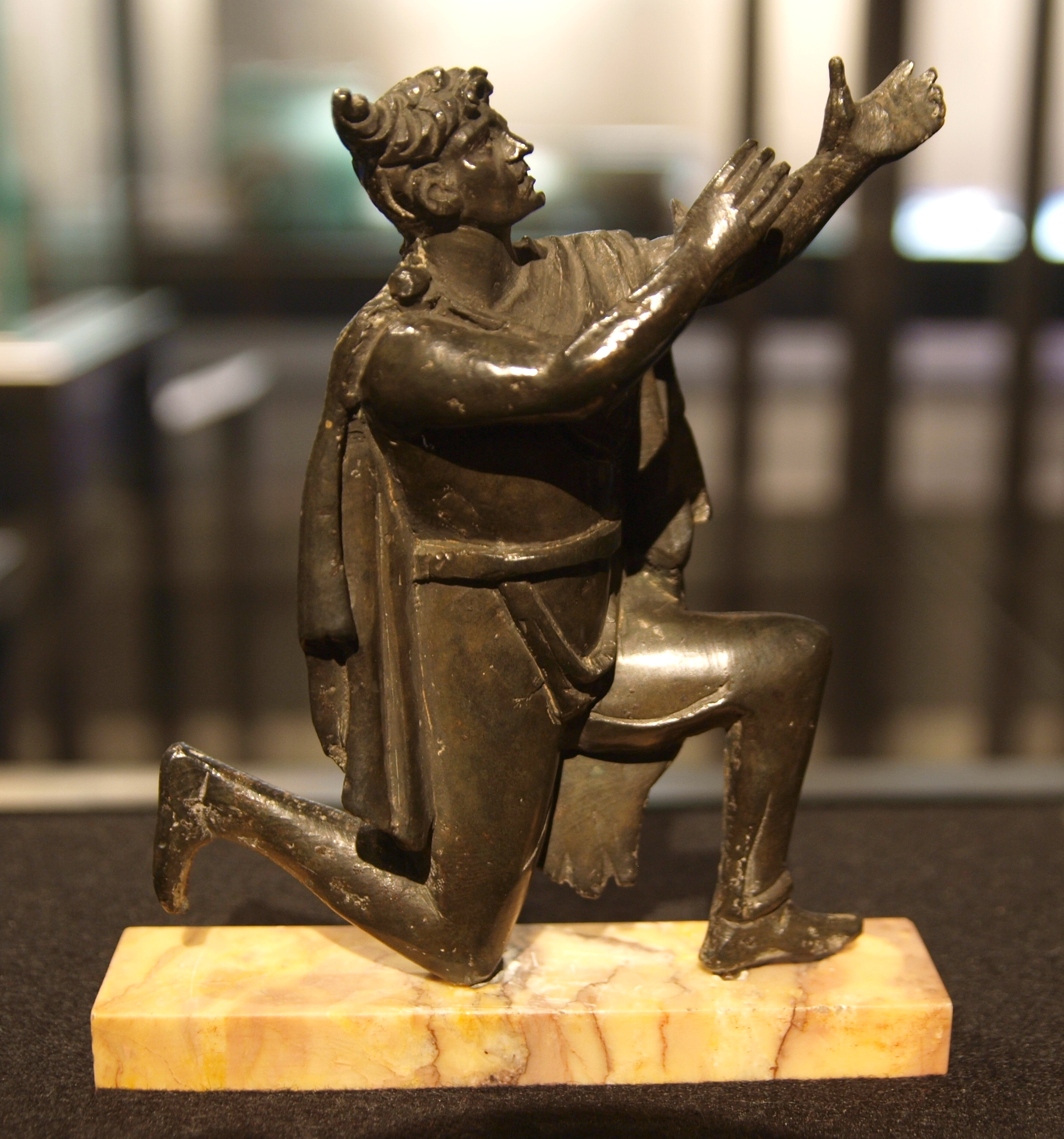
Roman bronze statuette dated to the late 1st century – early 2nd century CE, representing a Germanic man with his hair in a Suebian knot

The Germanic peoples were tribal groups who lived in Northern Europe during Classical antiquity and the Early Middle Ages. In modern scholarship, they typically include the Roman-era Germani who lived in both Germania and parts of the Roman Empire, and all Germanic-speaking peoples from this era, irrespective of where they lived, most notably the Goths. Another term, ancient Germans, is considered problematic by many scholars because it suggests identity with present-day Germans. Although the first Roman descriptions of Germani involved tribes west of the Rhine river, their homeland of Germania was portrayed as stretching east of the Rhine, to southern Scandinavia and the Vistula in the east, and to the upper Danube in the south. Other Germanic speakers, such as the Bastarnae and Goths, lived further east in what is now Moldova and Ukraine. The term Germani is generally only used to refer to historical peoples from the 1st to 4th centuries CE.

Different academic disciplines have their own definitions of what makes someone or something "Germanic". Some scholars call for the term's total abandonment as a modern construct, since lumping "Germanic peoples" together implies a common group identity for which there is little evidence. Other scholars have defended the term's continued use and argue that a common Germanic language allows one to speak of "Germanic peoples", regardless of whether these ancient and medieval peoples saw themselves as having a common identity. Scholars generally agree that it is possible to refer to Germanic languages from about 500 BCE. Archaeologists usually associate the earliest clearly identifiable Germanic speaking peoples with the Jastorf culture of the Pre-Roman Iron Age in central and northern Germany and southern Denmark from the 6th to 1st centuries BCE. This culture existed around the same time that the First Germanic Consonant Shift is theorized to have occurred, leading to recognizably Germanic languages. (Note: The earlier Nordic Bronze Age of southern Scandinavia also shows definite population and material continuities with the Jastorf Culture, but it is unclear whether these indicate ethnic continuity.) Germanic language speakers expanded south, east, and west, coming into contact with Celtic, Iranic, Baltic, and Slavic peoples before they were noted by the Romans.

Roman authors first described the Germani near the Rhine in the 1st century BCE, while the Roman Empire was establishing its dominance in that region. Under Emperor Augustus (27 BCE – 14 CE), the Romans attempted to conquer a large part of Germania between the Rhine and Elbe, but withdrew after their shocking defeat at the Battle of the Teutoburg Forest in 9 CE. The Romans continued to manage the Germanic frontier carefully, meddling in cross-border politics, and constructing a long fortified border, the Limes Germanicus. From 166 to 180 CE, Rome was embroiled in a conflict against the Germanic Marcomanni and Quadi with their allies, which was known as the Marcomannic Wars. After this major disruption, new groupings of Germanic peoples appear for the first time in the historical record, such as the Franks, Goths, Saxons, and Alemanni. During the Migration Period (375–568), such Germanic peoples entered the Roman Empire and eventually established their own "barbarian kingdoms" within the territory of the Western Roman empire itself. Over time, the Franks became the most powerful of them, conquering many of the others. Eventually, the Frankish king Charlemagne claimed the title of Holy Roman Emperor for himself in 800.

Archaeological finds suggest that Roman-era sources portrayed the Germanic way of life as more primitive than it actually was. Instead, archaeologists have unveiled evidence of a complex society and economy throughout Germania. Germanic-speaking peoples originally shared similar religious practices. Denoted by the term Germanic paganism, they varied throughout the territory occupied by Germanic-speaking peoples. Over the course of Late Antiquity, most continental Germanic peoples and the Anglo-Saxons of Britain converted to Christianity, but the Saxons and Scandinavians converted only much later. The Germanic peoples shared a native script—known as runes—from around the first century or before, which was gradually replaced with the Latin script, although runes continued to be used for specialized purposes thereafter.

Traditionally, the Germanic peoples have been seen as possessing a law dominated by the concepts of feuding and blood compensation. The precise details, nature and origin of what is still normally called "Germanic law" are now controversial. Roman sources state that the Germanic peoples made decisions in a popular assembly (the thing) but that they also had kings and war leaders. The ancient Germanic-speaking peoples probably shared a common poetic tradition, alliterative verse, and later Germanic peoples also shared legends originating in the Migration Period.

The publishing of Tacitus's Germania by humanist scholars in the 1400s greatly influenced the emerging idea of "Germanic peoples". Later scholars of the Romantic period, such as Jacob and Wilhelm Grimm, developed several theories about the nature of the Germanic peoples that were highly influenced by romantic nationalism. For those scholars, the "Germanic" and modern "German" were identical. Ideas about the early Germans were also highly influential among members of the nationalist and racist völkisch movement and later co-opted by the Nazis. During the second half of the 20th century, the controversial misuse of ancient Germanic history and archaeology was discredited and has since resulted in a backlash against many aspects of earlier scholarship.

== Terminology ==
=== Etymology ===
The etymology of the Latin word Germani, from which Latin Germania and English Germanic are derived, is unknown, although several proposals have been put forward. Even the language from which it derives is a subject of dispute, with proposals of Germanic, Celtic, Latin, and Illyrian origins. Herwig Wolfram, for example, thinks Germani must be Gaulish. The historian Wolfgang Pfeifer more or less concurs with Wolfram and surmises that the name Germani is likely of Celtic etymology and is related to the Old Irish word gair ('neighbours') or could be tied to the Celtic word for their war cries, gairm, which simplifies into 'the neighbours' or 'the screamers'. Regardless of its language of origin, the name was transmitted to the Romans via Celtic speakers.

It is unclear whether any people group ever referred to themselves as Germani. By late antiquity, only peoples near the Rhine, especially the Franks and sometimes the Alemanni, were called Germani or Germanoi by Latin and Greek writers respectively. Germani subsequently ceased to be used as a name for any group of people and was revived as such only by the humanists in the 16th century. Previously, scholars during the Carolingian period (8th–11th centuries) had already begun using Germania and Germanicus in a territorial sense to refer to East Francia.

In modern English, the adjective Germanic is distinct from German, which is generally used when referring to modern Germans only. Germanic relates to the ancient Germani or the broader Germanic group. In modern German, the ancient Germani are called Germanen and their country Germania is Germanien, and there are clearly distinct terms for modern Germans (Deutsche) and modern Germany (Deutschland). In English however there are no common terms which distinguish Germans from Germani, or Germany from Germania, blurring the distinctions. To avoid ambiguity the Latin terms are often used, or the Germani are sometimes called "ancient Germans".

=== Modern definitions and controversies ===
The modern definition of Germanic peoples developed in the 19th century, when the term Germanic was linked to the newly identified Germanic language family. Linguistics provided a new way of defining the Germanic peoples, which came to be used in historiography and archaeology. While Roman authors did not consistently exclude Celtic-speaking people or have a term corresponding to Germanic-speaking peoples, this new definition—which used the Germanic language as the main criterion—presented the Germani as a people or nation (Volk) with a stable group identity linked to language. As a result, some scholars treat the Germani (Latin) or Germanoi (Greek) of Roman-era sources as non-Germanic if they seemingly spoke non-Germanic languages. For clarity, Germanic peoples, when defined as "speakers of a Germanic language", are sometimes referred to as "Germanic-speaking peoples". Today, the term "Germanic" is widely applied to "phenomena including identities, social, cultural or political groups, to material cultural artefacts, languages and texts, and even specific chemical sequences found in human DNA". Several scholars continue to use the term to refer to a culture existing between the 1st to 4th centuries CE, but most historians and archaeologists researching Late Antiquity and the Early Middle Ages no longer use it.

Apart from the designation of a language family (i.e., "Germanic languages"), the application of the term "Germanic" has become controversial in scholarship since 1990, especially among archaeologists and historians. Scholars have increasingly questioned the notion of ethnically defined people groups (Völker) as stable basic actors of history. The connection of archaeological assemblages to ethnicity has also been increasingly questioned. This has resulted in different disciplines developing different definitions of "Germanic". Beginning with the work of the "Toronto School" around Walter Goffart, various scholars have denied that anything such as a common Germanic ethnic identity ever existed. Such scholars argue that most ideas about Germanic culture are taken from far later epochs and projected backwards to antiquity. Historians of the Vienna School, such as Walter Pohl, have also called for the term to be avoided or used with careful explanation, and argued that there is little evidence for a common Germanic identity. The Anglo-Saxonist Leonard Neidorf writes that historians of the continental-European Germanic peoples of the 5th and 6th centuries are "in agreement" that there was no pan-Germanic identity or solidarity. Whether a scholar favors the existence of a common Germanic identity or not is often related to their position on the nature of the end of the Roman Empire.

Defenders of continued use of the term Germanic argue that the speakers of Germanic languages can be identified as Germanic people by language regardless of how they saw themselves. Linguists and philologists have generally reacted skeptically to claims that there was no Germanic identity or cultural unity, and they may view Germanic simply as a long-established and convenient term. Some archaeologists have also argued in favor of retaining the term Germanic due to its broad recognizability. Archaeologist Heiko Steuer defines his own work on the Germani in geographical terms (covering Germania), rather than in ethnic terms. He nevertheless argues for some sense of shared identity between the Germani, noting the use of a common language, a common runic script, various common objects of material culture such as bracteates and gullgubber (small gold objects) and the confrontation with Rome as things that could cause a sense of shared "Germanic" culture. Despite being cautious of the use of Germanic to refer to peoples, Sebastian Brather, Wilhelm Heizmann and Steffen Patzold nevertheless refer to further commonalities such as the widely attested worship of deities such as Odin, Thor and Frigg, and a shared legendary tradition.

=== Classical terminology ===
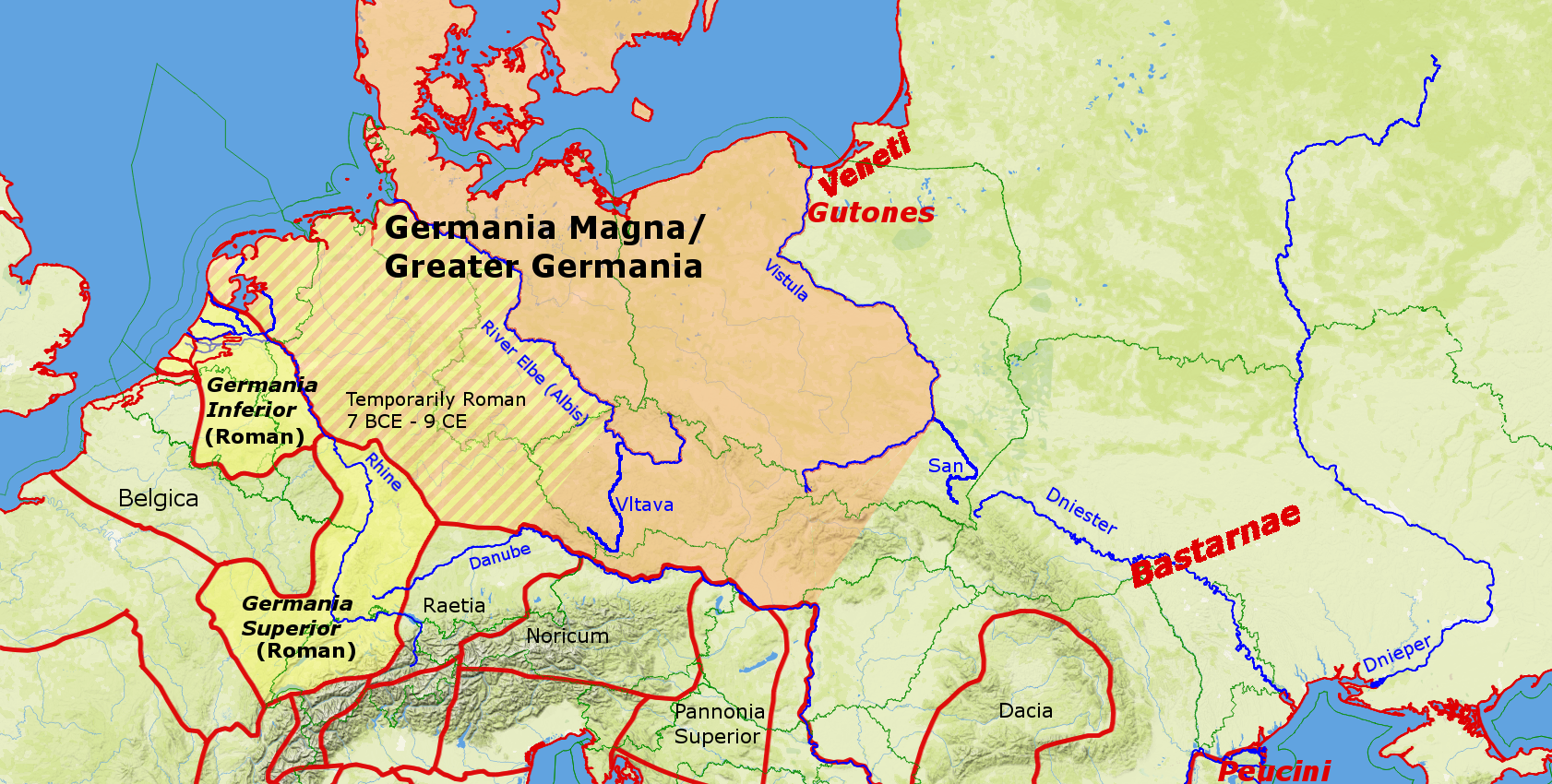
Several different regions called Germania in the Roman era, about 0-200 CE (names in red were peoples called Germani, despite not living within Germania)

The first author to describe the Germani as a large category of peoples distinct from the Gauls and Scythians was Julius Caesar, writing around 55 BCE during his governorship of Gaul. In Caesar's account, the clearest defining characteristic of the Germani people was that their homeland was east of the Rhine, opposite Gaul on the west side. Caesar sought to explain both why his legions stopped at the Rhine and also why the Germani were more dangerous than the Gauls to the empire. Explaining this threat he also classified the Cimbri and Teutons, who had previously invaded Italy, as Germani. Although Caesar described the Rhine as the border between Germani and Celts, he also describes the Germani cisrhenani on the west bank of the Rhine, who he believed had moved from the east. It is unclear if these Germani were actually Germanic speakers. According to the Roman historian Tacitus in his Germania (c. 98 CE), it was among this group, specifically the Tungri, that the name Germani first arose, before it spread to further groups. Tacitus reported that in his time many of the peoples west of the Rhine within Roman Gaul were still considered Germani. Caesar's division of the Germani from the Celts was not taken up by most writers in Greek.

Caesar and authors following him regarded Germania as stretching east of the Rhine for an indeterminate distance, bounded by the Baltic Sea and the Hercynian Forest. Pliny the Elder and Tacitus placed the eastern border at the Vistula. The Upper Danube served as a southern border. Between there and the Vistula Tacitus sketched an unclear boundary, describing Germania as separated in the south and east from the Dacians and the Sarmatians by mutual fear or mountains. This undefined eastern border is related to a lack of stable frontiers in this area such as were maintained by Roman armies along the Rhine and Danube. The geographer Ptolemy (2nd century CE) applied the name Germania magna ("Greater Germania", Greek: Γερμανία Μεγάλη) to this area, contrasting it with the Roman provinces of Germania Prima and Germania Secunda (on the west bank of the Rhine). In modern scholarship, Germania magna is sometimes also called Germania libera ("free Germania"), a name coined by Jacob Grimm around 1835.

Caesar and, following him, Tacitus, depicted the Germani as sharing elements of a common culture. A small number of passages by Tacitus and other Roman authors (Caesar, Suetonius) mention Germanic tribes or individuals speaking a language distinct from Gaulish. For Tacitus (Germania 43, 45, 46), language was a characteristic, but not defining feature of the Germanic peoples. Many of the ascribed ethnic characteristics of the Germani represented them as typically "barbarian", including the possession of stereotypical vices such as "wildness" and of virtues such as chastity. Tacitus was at times unsure whether a people were Germanic or not. He expressed uncertainty about the Peucini, who he says spoke and lived like the Germani, though they did not live in Germania, and they were beginning to look like Sarmatians through intermarriage. The Osi and Cotini lived in Germania, but were not Germani, because they had other languages and customs. (Note: Tacitus, Germania 43: Cotinos Gallica, Osos Pannonica lingua coarguit non esse Germanos. However they were Germanic by country (natio), Germania 28: Osis, Germanorum natione.) The Aesti lived on the eastern shore of the Baltic and were like Suebi in their appearance and customs, although they spoke a different language. Ancient authors did not differentiate consistently between a territorial definition ("those living in Germania") and an ethnic definition ("having Germanic ethnic characteristics"), and the two definitions did not always align.

In the 3rd century, when Romans encountered Germanic-speaking peoples living north of the Lower Danube who fought on horseback, such as Goths and Gepids, they did not call them Germani. Instead, they connected them with non-Germanic-speaking peoples such as the Huns, Sarmatians, and Alans, who shared a similar culture. Romans also called them "Gothic peoples", (gentes Gothicae) even if they did not speak a Germanic language, and they often referred to the Goths as "Getae", equating them to a non-Germanic people residing in the same region. The writer Procopius described these new "Getic" peoples as sharing similar appearance, laws, Arian religion, and a common language.

=== Subdivisions ===
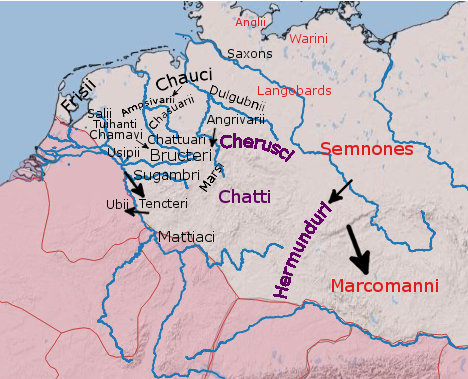
The approximate positions of the three groups and their sub-peoples reported by Tacitus: Suebi (part of the Herminones) Other Herminones

Several ancient sources list subdivisions of the Germanic tribes. Writing in the first century CE, Pliny the Elder lists five Germanic subgroups: the Vandili, the Inguaeones, the Istuaeones (living near the Rhine), the Herminones (in the Germanic interior), and the Peucini Basternae (living on the lower Danube near the Dacians). In chapter 2 of the Germania, written about a half-century later, Tacitus lists only three subgroups: the Ingvaeones (near the sea), the Herminones (in the interior of Germania), and the Istvaeones (the remainder of the tribes); Tacitus says these groups each claimed descent from the god Mannus, son of Tuisto. Tacitus also mentions a second tradition that there were four sons of either Mannus or Tuisto from whom the groups of the Marsi, Gambrivi, Suebi, and Vandili claim descent. The Herminones are also mentioned by Pomponius Mela, but otherwise, these divisions do not appear in other ancient works on the Germani.

There are a number of inconsistencies in the listing of Germanic subgroups by Tacitus and Pliny. While both Tacitus and Pliny mention some Scandinavian tribes, they are not integrated into the subdivisions. While Pliny lists the Suebi as part of the Herminones, Tacitus treats them as a separate group. Additionally, Tacitus's description of a group of tribes as united by the cult of Nerthus (Germania 40) as well as the cult of the Alcis controlled by the Nahanarvali (Germania 43) and Tacitus's account of the origin myth of the Semnones (Germania 39) all suggest different subdivisions than the three mentioned in Germania chapter 2.

The subdivisions found in Pliny and Tacitus have been very influential for scholarship on Germanic history and language up until recent times. However, outside of Tacitus and Pliny there are no other textual indications that these groups were important. The subgroups mentioned by Tacitus are not used by him elsewhere in his work, contradict other parts of his work, and cannot be reconciled with Pliny, who is equally inconsistent. Additionally, there is no linguistic or archaeological evidence for these subgroups. New archaeological finds have tended to show that the boundaries between Germanic peoples were very permeable, and scholars now assume that migration and the collapse and formation of cultural units were constant occurrences within Germania. Nevertheless, various aspects such as the alliteration of many of the tribal names in Tacitus's account and the name of Mannus himself suggest that the descent from Mannus was an authentic Germanic tradition.

== Languages ==
=== Proto-Germanic ===
All Germanic languages derive from the Proto-Indo-European language (PIE), which is generally thought to have been spoken between 4500 and 2500 BCE. The ancestor of Germanic languages is referred to as Proto- or Common Germanic, and likely represented a group of mutually intelligible dialects. They share distinctive characteristics which set them apart from other Indo-European sub-families of languages, such as Grimm's and Verner's law, the conservation of the PIE ablaut system in the Germanic verb system (notably in strong verbs), or the merger of the vowels a and o qualities (ə, a, o > a; ā, ō > ō). During the Pre-Germanic linguistic period (2500–500 BCE), the proto-language was almost certainly influenced by an unknown non-Indo-European language, still noticeable in the Germanic phonology and lexicon. (Note: The reconstruction of such loanwords remains a difficult task, since no descendant language of substrate dialects is attested, and plausible etymological explanations have been found for many Germanic lexemes previously regarded as of non-Indo-European origin. The English term sword, long regarded as "without etymology", was found to be cognate with the Ancient Greek áor, the sword hung to the shoulder with valuable rings, both descending from the PIE root *swerd-, denoting the 'suspended sword'. Similarly, the word hand could descend from a PGer. form *handu- 'pike' (< *handuga- 'having a pike'), possibly related to Greek kenteîn 'to stab, poke' and kéntron 'stinging agent, pricker'. However, there is still a set of words of Proto-Germanic origin, attested in Old High German since the 8th c., which have found so far no competing Indo-European etymologies, however unlikely: e.g., Adel 'aristocratic lineage'; Asch 'barge'; Beute 'board'; Loch 'lock'; Säule 'pillar'; etc.)

Although Proto-Germanic is reconstructed without dialects via the comparative method, it is almost certain that it never was a uniform proto-language. The late Jastorf culture occupied so much territory that it is unlikely that Germanic populations spoke a single dialect, and traces of early linguistic varieties have been highlighted by scholars. Sister dialects of Proto-Germanic itself certainly existed, as evidenced by the absence of the First Germanic Sound Shift (Grimm's law) in some "Para-Germanic" recorded proper names, and the reconstructed Proto-Germanic language was only one among several dialects spoken at that time by peoples identified as "Germanic" by Roman sources or archeological data. Although Roman sources name various Germanic tribes such as Suevi, Alemanni, Baiuvarii, etc., it is unlikely that the members of these tribes all spoke the same dialect.

=== Early attestations ===
Definite and comprehensive evidence of Germanic lexical units only occurred after Caesar's conquest of Gaul in the 1st century BCE, after which contacts with Proto-Germanic speakers began to intensify. The Alcis, a pair of brother gods worshipped by the Nahanarvali, are given by Tacitus as a Latinized form of *alhiz (a kind of 'stag'), and the word sapo ('hair dye') is certainly borrowed from Proto-Germanic *saipwōn- (English soap), as evidenced by the parallel Finnish loanword saipio. The name of the framea, described by Tacitus as a short spear carried by Germanic warriors, most likely derives from the compound *fram-ij-an- ('forward-going one'), as suggested by comparable semantical structures found in early runes (e.g., raun-ij-az 'tester', on a lancehead) and linguistic cognates attested in the later Old Norse, Old Saxon and Old High German languages: fremja, fremmian and fremmen all mean 'to carry out'.

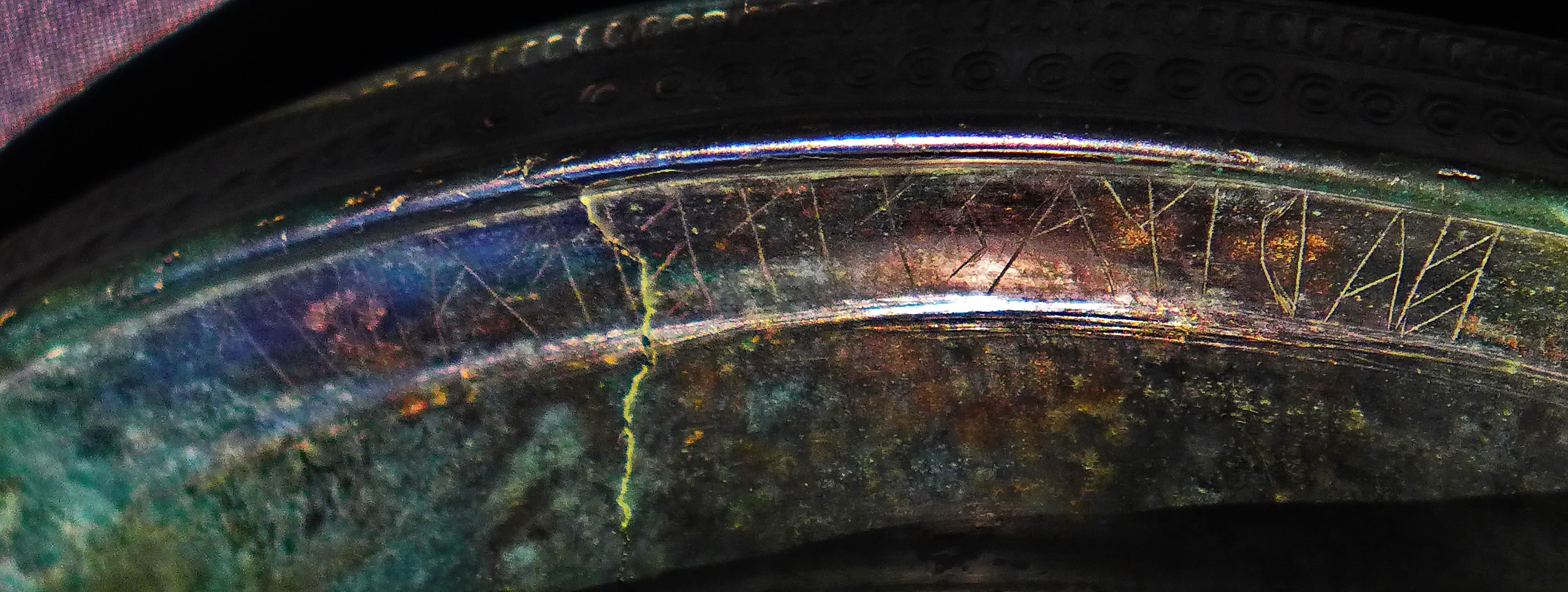
The inscription on the Negau helmet B, carved in the Etruscan alphabet during the 3rd–2nd c. BCE, is generally regarded as Proto-Germanic.

In the absence of earlier evidence, it must be assumed that Proto-Germanic speakers living in Germania were members of preliterate societies. The only pre-Roman inscriptions that could be interpreted as Proto-Germanic, written in the Etruscan alphabet, have not been found in Germania but rather in the Venetic region. The inscription harikastiteiva\\\ip, engraved on the Negau helmet in the 3rd–2nd centuries BCE, possibly by a Germanic-speaking warrior involved in combat in northern Italy, has been interpreted by some scholars as Harigasti Teiwǣ (*harja-gastiz 'army-guest' + *teiwaz 'god, deity'), which could be an invocation to a war-god or a mark of ownership engraved by its possessor. The inscription Fariarix (*farjōn- 'ferry' + *rīk- 'ruler') carved on tetradrachms found in Bratislava (mid-1st c. BCE) may indicate the Germanic name of a Celtic ruler.

=== Linguistic disintegration ===
By the time Germanic speakers entered written history, their linguistic territory had stretched farther south, since a Germanic dialect continuum (where neighbouring language varieties diverged only slightly between each other, but remote dialects were not necessarily mutually intelligible due to accumulated differences over the distance) covered a region roughly located between the Rhine, the Vistula, the Danube, and southern Scandinavia during the first two centuries of the Common Era. East Germanic speakers dwelled on the Baltic sea coasts and islands, while speakers of the Northwestern dialects occupied territories in present-day Denmark and bordering parts of Germany at the earliest date when they can be identified.

In the 2nd and 3rd centuries CE, migrations of East Germanic gentes from the Baltic Sea coast southeastwards into the hinterland led to their separation from the dialect continuum. By the late 3rd century CE, linguistic divergences like the West Germanic loss of the final consonant -z had already occurred within the "residual" Northwest dialect continuum. The latter definitely ended after the 5th- and 6th-century migrations of Angles, Jutes and part of the Saxon tribes towards modern-day England.

=== Classification ===
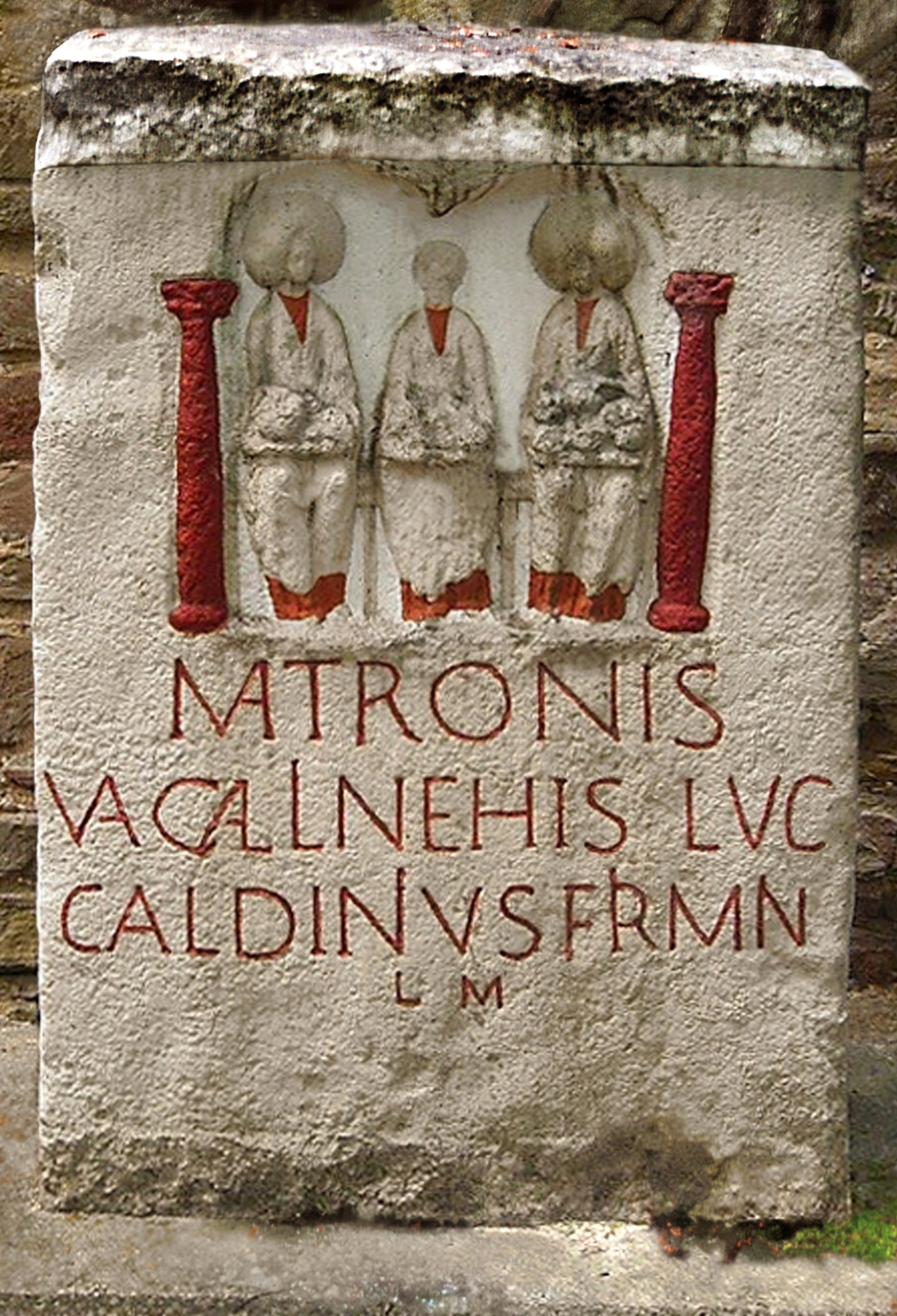
Replica of an altar for the Matrons of Vacallina (Matronae Vacallinehae) from Mechernich-Weyer, Germany

The Germanic languages are traditionally divided between East, North and West Germanic branches. The modern prevailing view is that North and West Germanic were also encompassed in a larger subgroup called Northwest Germanic.

- Northwest Germanic: mainly characterized by the i-umlaut, and the shift of the long vowel *ē towards a long *ā in accented syllables; it remained a dialect continuum following the migration of East Germanic speakers in the 2nd–3rd century CE;
  - North Germanic or Primitive Norse: initially characterized by the monophthongization of the sound ai to ā (attested from c. 400 BCE); a uniform northern dialect or koiné attested in runic inscriptions from the 2nd century CE onward, it remained practically unchanged until a transitional period that started in the late 5th century; and Old Norse, a language attested by runic inscriptions written in the Younger Fuþark from the beginning of the Viking Age (8th–9th centuries CE);
  - West Germanic: including Old Saxon (attested from the 5th c. CE), Old English (late 5th c.), Old Frisian (6th c.), Frankish (6th c.), Old High German (6th c.), and possibly Langobardic (6th c.), which is only scarcely attested; they are mainly characterized by the loss of the final consonant -z (attested from the late 3rd century), and by the j-consonant gemination (attested from c. 400 BCE); early inscriptions from the West Germanic areas found on altars where votive offerings were made to the Matronae Vacallinehae (Matrons of Vacallina) in the Rhineland dated to c. 160–260 CE; West Germanic remained a "residual" dialect continuum until the Anglo-Saxon migrations in the 5th–6th centuries CE;
- East Germanic, of which only Gothic is attested by both runic inscriptions (from the 3rd c. CE) and textual evidence (principally Wulfila's Bible; c. 350–380). It became extinct after the fall of the Visigothic Kingdom in the early 8th century. The inclusion of the Burgundian and Vandalic languages within the East Germanic group, while plausible, is still uncertain due to their scarce attestation. The latest attested East Germanic language, Crimean Gothic, has been partially recorded in the 16th century.

Further internal classifications are still debated among scholars, as it is unclear whether the internal features shared by several branches are due to early common innovations or to the later diffusion of local dialectal innovations. (Note: Rübekeil 2017, pp. 996–997: West Germanic: "There seems to be a principal distinction between the northern and the southern part of this group; the demarcation between both parts, however, is a matter of controversy. The northern part, North Sea Gmc or Ingvaeonic, is the larger one, but it is a moot point whether Old Saxon and Old Low Franconian really belong to it, and if yes, to what extent they participate in all its characteristic developments. (...) As a whole, there are arguments for a close relationship between Anglo-Frisian on the one hand and Old Saxon and Old Low Franconian on the other; there are, however, counter-arguments as well. The question as to whether the common features are old and inherited or have emerged by connections over the North Sea is still controversial.")

== History ==
=== Prehistory ===
The Germanic-speaking peoples speak Indo-European languages. The leading theory for the origin of Germanic languages, suggested by archaeological, linguistic and genetic evidence, postulates a diffusion of Indo-European languages from the Pontic–Caspian steppe towards Northern Europe during the third millennium BCE, with linguistic contacts and migrations from the area of the Corded Ware culture towards present-day Denmark, resulting in cultural mixing with the earlier Funnelbeaker culture. (Note: Iversen & Kroonen 2017, p. 521: "In the more than 250 years (ca. 2850–2600 B.C.E.) when late Funnel Beaker farmers coexisted with the new Single Grave culture communities within a relatively small area of present-day Denmark, processes of cultural and linguistic exchange were almost inevitable—if not widespread.") The subsequent culture of the Nordic Bronze Age (c. 2000/1750 to c. 500 BCE) shows definite cultural and population continuities with later Germanic peoples, and is often supposed to have been the culture in which the Germanic Parent Language, the predecessor of the Proto-Germanic language, developed. However, it is unclear whether these earlier peoples possessed any ethnic continuity with the later Germanic peoples.

Generally, scholars agree that it is possible to speak of Germanic-speaking peoples after 500 BCE, although the first attestation of the name Germani does not occur until much later. Between around 500 BCE and the beginning of the common era, archeological and linguistic evidence suggest that the Urheimat ('original homeland') of the Proto-Germanic language, the ancestral idiom of all attested Germanic dialects, existed in or near the archaeological culture known as the late Jastorf culture of the central Elbe in present day Germany, stretching north into Jutland and east into present-day Poland. (Note: Ringe 2006, p. 85: "Early Jastorf, at the end of the 7th century BCE, is almost certainly too early for the last common ancestor of the attested languages; but later Jastorf culture and its successors occupy so much territory that their populations are most unlikely to have spoken a single dialect, even granting that the expansion of the culture was relatively rapid. It follows that our reconstructed PGmc was only one of the dialects spoken by peoples identified archeologically, or by the Romans, as 'Germans'; the remaining Germanic peoples spoke sister dialects of PGmc." Polomé 1992, p. 51: "...if the Jastorf culture and, probably, the neighboring Harpstedt culture to the west constitute the Germanic homeland, a spread of Proto-Germanic northwards and eastwards would have to be assumed, which might explain both the archaisms and the innovative features of North Germanic and East Germanic, and would fit nicely with recent views locating the homeland of the Goths in Poland.") If the Jastorf Culture is the origin of the Germanic peoples, then the Scandinavian peninsula would have become Germanic either via migration or via assimilation over the course of the same period. Alternatively, Hermann Ament has stressed that two other archaeological groups must have belonged to the Germani: one on either side of the Lower Rhine and reaching to the Weser, and another in Jutland and southern Scandinavia. These groups would thus suggest a "polycentric origin" for the Germanic peoples. The neighboring Przeworsk culture in modern Poland is thought to possibly reflect both a Germanic and a Slavic component. (Note: Mallory and Adams observe: "The Przeworsk Culture shows continuity with preceding cultures (Lusatian) and insures that the Slavic homeland was in its territory from whence the Venedi, one of the earliest historically attested Slavic tribes are specifically derived. On the other hand, Germanicists have argued that the Przeworsk culture was occupied by the Elbe-Germanic tribes and there are also those who argue that the Przeworsk reflects both a Germanic and Slavic component.") The identification of the Jastorf culture with the Germani has been criticized by Sebastian Brather, who notes that it seems to be missing areas such as southern Scandinavia and the Rhine-Weser area, which linguists argue to have been Germanic, while also not according with the Roman-era definition of Germani, which included Celtic-speaking peoples further south and west.

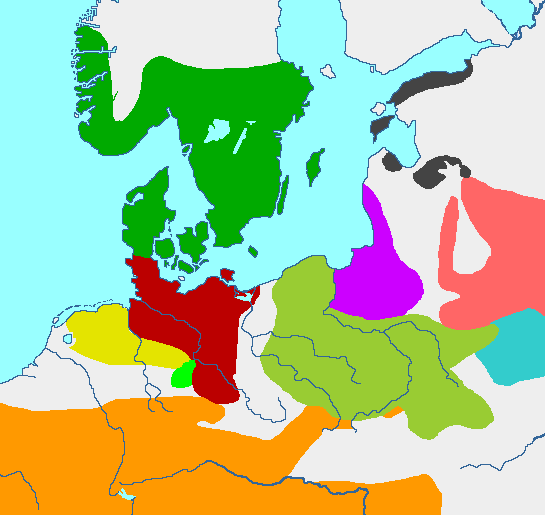
Iron Age: Orange Field – La Tène culture (Celtic), Dark Red – Jastorf culture (Germanic), Dark Green – Iron Age Scandinavia (Germanic)

One category of evidence used to attempt to locate the Proto-Germanic homeland uses traces of early linguistic contacts with neighbouring languages. Germanic loanwords in the Finnic and Sámi languages have preserved archaic forms (e.g. Finnic kuningas, from Proto-Germanic *kuningaz 'king'; rengas, from *hringaz 'ring'; etc.), with the older loan-layers possibly dating back to an earlier period of intense contacts between pre-Germanic and Finno-Permic (i.e. Finno-Samic) speakers. Shared lexical innovations between Celtic and Germanic languages, concentrated in certain semantic domains such as religion and warfare, indicate intensive contacts between the Germani and Celtic peoples, usually identified with the archaeological La Tène culture, found in southern Germany and the modern Czech Republic. Early contacts probably occurred during the Pre-Germanic and Pre-Celtic periods, dated to the 2nd millennium BCE, (Note: Koch 2020, pp. 79–80: "New words shared between these languages at this period are not detectable as loanwords. The smaller number that do show Celtic innovations probably post-date the transition from Pre-Celtic to Proto-Celtic ~1200 BC. For example, the Celto-Germanic group name giving Proto-Germanic *Burgunþaz and Pro-Celtic *Brigantes was *Bhr̥ghn̥tes, which then independently underwent the Germanic and Celtic treatments of Proto-Indo-European syllabic *r̥ and *n̥ . It would be unlikely for the name to have its attested Germanic form if it had been borrowed from Celtic after ~1200 BC and probably impossible after ~900 BC.") and the Celts appear to have had a large amount of influence on Germanic culture up until the first century CE, which led to a high degree of Celtic-Germanic shared material-culture and social organization. Scholars have also highlighted some evidence of linguistic convergence between Germanic and the Italic languages, whose Urheimat is supposed to have been situated north of the Alps before the 1st millennium BCE. Shared grammatical innovations point to contacts between Germanic and Balto-Slavic; however, some features are shared only with Baltic, suggesting later contact after the Balto-Slavic split, with similarities with Slavic interpreted as remnants of Indo-European archaisms or the result of secondary contact. (Note: Timpe & Scardigli 2010, pp. 581–582: "Also: eine Gemeinsamkeit von Germ., Balt. und Slaw., wobei die Neuerungen vor allem in einer Gemeinsamkeit von Germ. und Balt. zum Ausdruck kommen; die Gemeinsamkeit von Germ. und Slaw. beruht mehr auf der Bewahrung urspr. Verhältnisse und weist damit nicht auf engere Gemeinsamkeiten im Verlauf der Entwicklung. (...) Die Kontakte zum Extrem auf der anderen Seite, dem Slaw., sind wohl nur als eine Begleiterscheinung der Kontakte zum Balt. aufzufassen. Diese Kontakte zum Balt. müssen allerdings teilweise recht alt sein."; Simmelkjær Sandgaard Hansen & Kroonen 2022, pp. 166–167: "... as for the Balto-Slavic connection, other pieces of evidence show shared innovations with Baltic only, not with Slavic, which indicates a period of contact and joint development between Germanic and Balto-Slavic languages during a relatively late time period and, in any event, after the initial breakup of Balto-Slavic.")

=== Earliest recorded history ===
According to some authors the Bastarnae, or Peucini, were the first Germani to be encountered by the Greco-Roman world and thus to be mentioned in historical records. They appear in historical sources going as far back as the 3rd century BCE through the 4th century CE. Another eastern people known from about 200 BCE, and sometimes believed to be Germanic-speaking, are the Sciri (Greek: Skiroi), who are recorded threatening the city of Olbia on the Black Sea. Late in the 2nd century BCE, Roman and Greek sources recount the migrations of the Cimbri, Teutones and Ambrones whom Caesar later classified as Germanic. The movements of these groups through parts of Gaul, Italy and Hispania resulted in the Cimbrian War (113–101 BCE) against the Romans, in which the Teutons and Cimbri were victorious over several Roman armies but were ultimately defeated.

The first century BCE was a time of the expansion of Germanic-speaking peoples at the expense of Celtic-speaking polities in modern southern Germany and the Czech Republic. Before 60 BCE, Ariovistus, described by Caesar as king of the Germani, led a force including Suevi across the Rhine into Gaul near Besançon, successfully aiding the Sequani against their enemies the Aedui at the Battle of Magetobriga. Ariovistus was initially considered an ally of Rome. In 58 BCE, with increasing numbers of settlers crossing the Rhine to join Ariovistus, Julius Caesar went to war with them, defeating them at the Battle of Vosges. In the following years Caesar pursued a controversial campaign to conquer all of Gaul on behalf of Rome, establishing the Rhine as a border. In 55 BCE he crossed the Rhine into Germania near Cologne. Near modern Nijmegen he also massacred a large migrating group of Tencteri and Usipetes who had crossed the Rhine from the east.

=== Roman Imperial Period to 375 ===
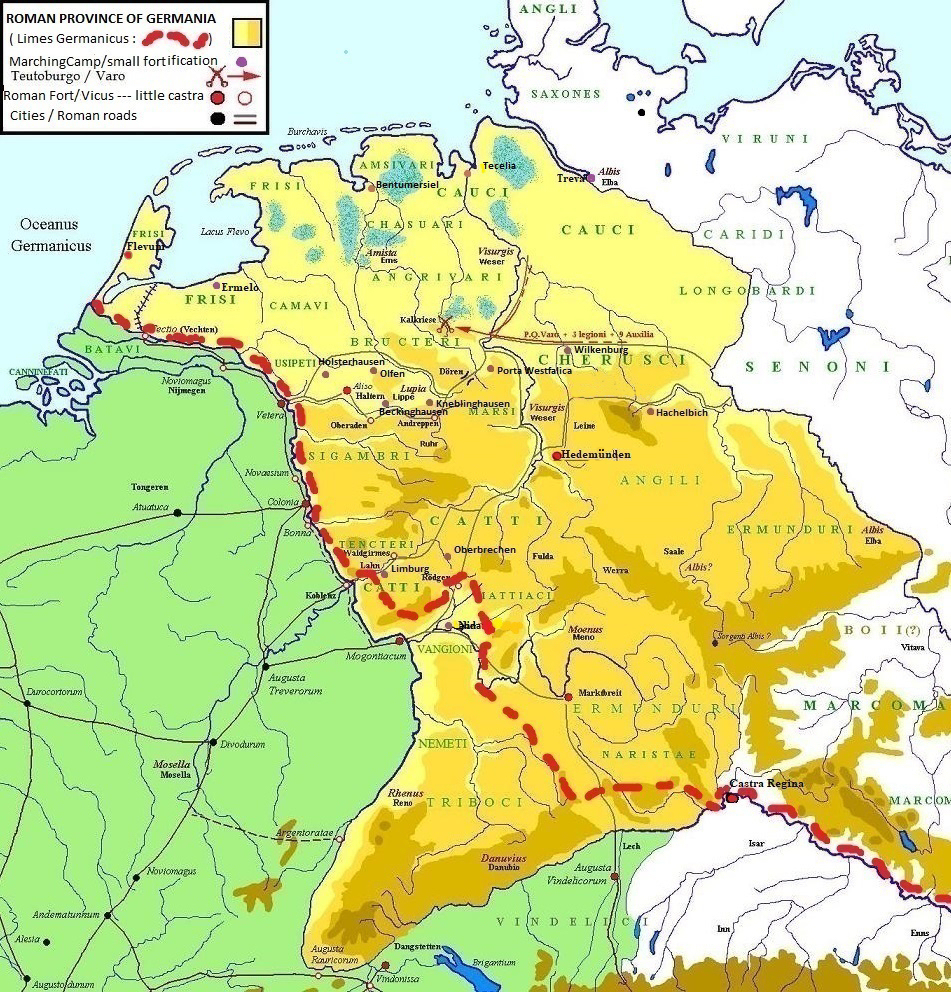
The Roman province of Germania, in existence from 7 BCE to 9 CE. The dotted line represents the Limes Germanicus, the fortified border constructed following the final withdrawal of Roman forces from Germania.

==== Early Roman Imperial period (27 BCE – 166 CE) ====
Throughout the reign of Augustus—from 27 BCE until 14 CE—the Roman empire expanded into Gaul, with the Rhine as a border. Starting in 13 BCE, there were Roman campaigns across the Rhine for a 28-year period. First came the pacification of the Usipetes, Sicambri, and Frisians near the Rhine, then attacks increased further from the Rhine, on the Chauci, Cherusci, Chatti and Suevi (including the Marcomanni). These campaigns eventually reached and even crossed the Elbe, and in 5 CE Tiberius was able to show strength by having a Roman fleet enter the Elbe and meet the legions in the heart of Germania. Once Tiberius subdued the Germanic people between the Rhine and the Elbe, the region at least up to Weser—and possibly up to the Elbe—was made the Roman province Germania and provided soldiers to the Roman army.

However, within this period two Germanic kings formed larger alliances. Both of them had spent some of their youth in Rome; the first of them was Maroboduus of the Marcomanni, (Note: Tacitus referred to him as king of the Suevians.) who had led his people away from the Roman activities into Bohemia, which was defended by forests and mountains, and had formed alliances with other peoples. In 6 CE, Rome planned an attack against him but the campaign was cut short when forces were needed for the Illyrian revolt in the Balkans. Just three years later (9 CE), the second of these Germanic figures, Arminius of the Cherusci—initially an ally of Rome—drew a large Roman force into an ambush in northern Germany, and destroyed the three legions of Publius Quinctilius Varus at the Battle of the Teutoburg Forest. Marboduus and Arminius went to war with each other in 17 CE; Arminius was victorious and Marboduus was forced to flee to the Romans.

Following the Roman defeat at the Teutoburg Forest, Rome gave up on the possibility of fully integrating this region into the empire. Rome launched successful campaigns across the Rhine between 14 and 16 CE under Tiberius and Germanicus, but the effort of integrating Germania now seemed to outweigh its benefits. In the reign of Augustus's successor, Tiberius, it became state policy to expand the empire no further than the frontier based roughly upon the Rhine and Danube, recommendations that were specified in the will of Augustus and read aloud by Tiberius himself. Roman intervention in Germania led to a shifting and unstable political situation, in which pro- and anti-Roman parties vied for power. Arminius was murdered in 21 CE by his fellow Germanic tribesmen, due in part to these tensions and for his attempt to claim supreme kingly power for himself.

In the wake of Arminius's death, Roman diplomats sought to keep the Germanic peoples divided and fractious. Rome established relationships with individual Germanic kings that are often discussed as being similar to client states; however, the situation on the border was always unstable, with rebellions by the Frisians in 28 CE, and attacks by the Chauci and Chatti in the 60s CE. The most serious threat to the Roman order was the Revolt of the Batavi in 69 CE, during the civil wars following the death of Nero known as the Year of the Four Emperors. The Batavi had long served as auxiliary troops in the Roman army as well as in the imperial bodyguard as the so-called Numerus Batavorum, often called the Germanic bodyguard. The uprising was led by Gaius Julius Civilis, a member of the Batavian royal family and Roman military officer, and attracted a large coalition of people both inside and outside of the Roman territory. The revolt ended following several defeats, with Civilis claiming to have only supported the imperial claims of Vespasian, who was victorious in the civil war.

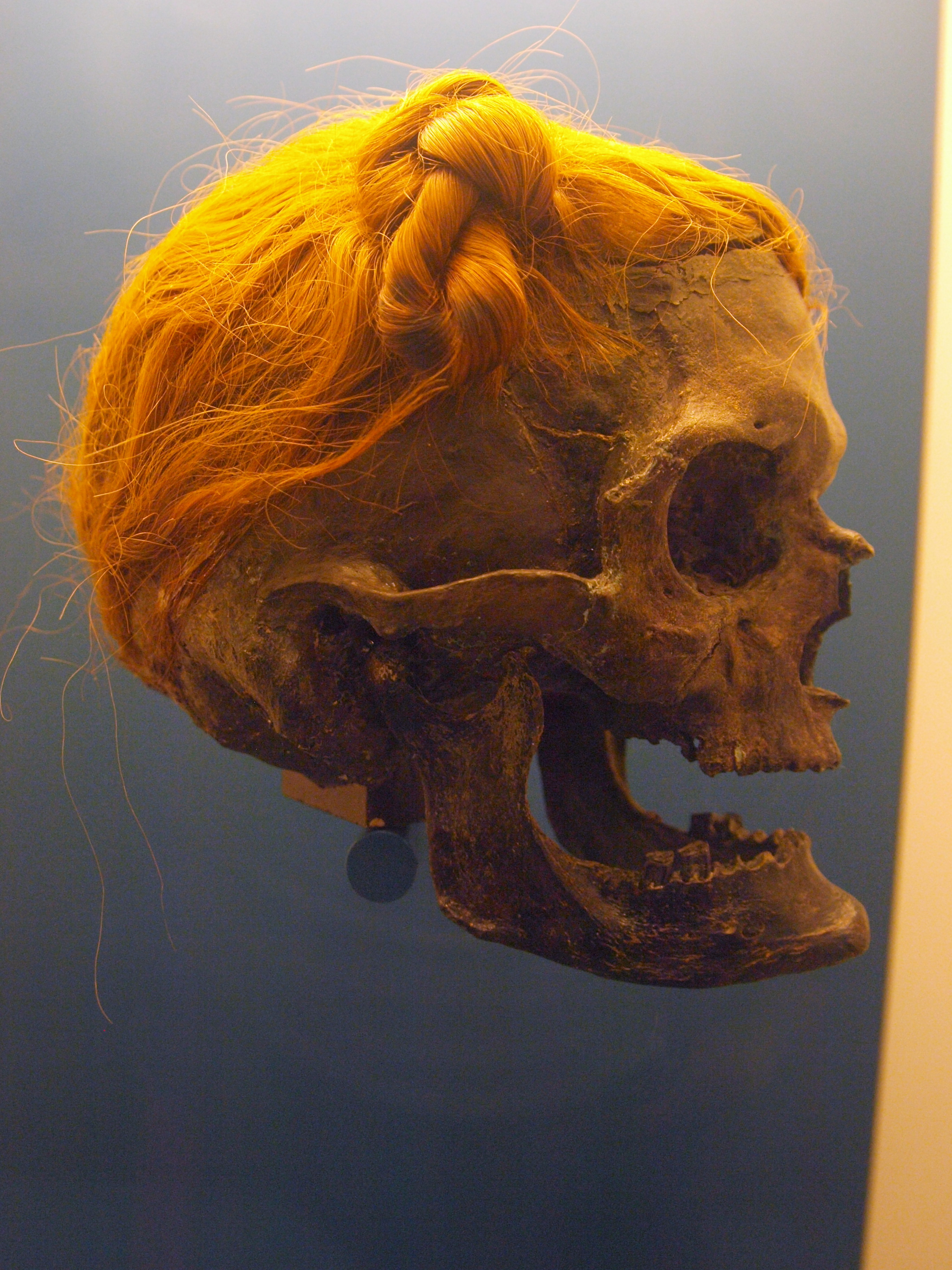
A bog body, the Osterby Man, displaying the Suebian knot, a hairstyle which, according to Tacitus, was common among Germanic warriors

The century after the Batavian Revolt saw mostly peace between the Germanic peoples and Rome. In 83 CE, Emperor Domitian of the Flavian dynasty attacked the Chatti north of Mogontiacum (now Mainz). This war would last until 85 CE. Following the end of the war with the Chatti, Domitian reduced the number of Roman soldiers on the upper Rhine and shifted the Roman military to guarding the Danube frontier, beginning the construction of the limes, the longest fortified border in the empire. The period afterwards was peaceful enough that the emperor Trajan reduced the number of soldiers on the frontier. According to Edward James, the Romans appear to have reserved the right to choose rulers among the barbarians on the frontier.

==== Marcomannic Wars to 375 CE ====
Following sixty years of quiet on the frontier, 166 CE saw a major incursion of peoples from north of the Danube during the reign of Marcus Aurelius, beginning the Marcomannic Wars. By 168 (during the Antonine plague), barbarian hosts consisting of Marcomanni, Quadi, and Sarmatian Iazyges, attacked and pushed their way to Italy. They advanced as far as Upper Italy, destroyed Opitergium/Oderzo and besieged Aquileia. The Romans had finished the war by 180, through a combination of Roman military victories, the resettling of some peoples on Roman territory, and by making alliances with others. Marcus Aurelius's successor Commodus chose not to permanently occupy any territory conquered north of the Danube, and the following decades saw an increase in the defenses at the limes. The Romans renewed their right to choose the kings of the Marcomanni and Quadi, and Commodus forbid them to hold assemblies unless a Roman centurion was present.

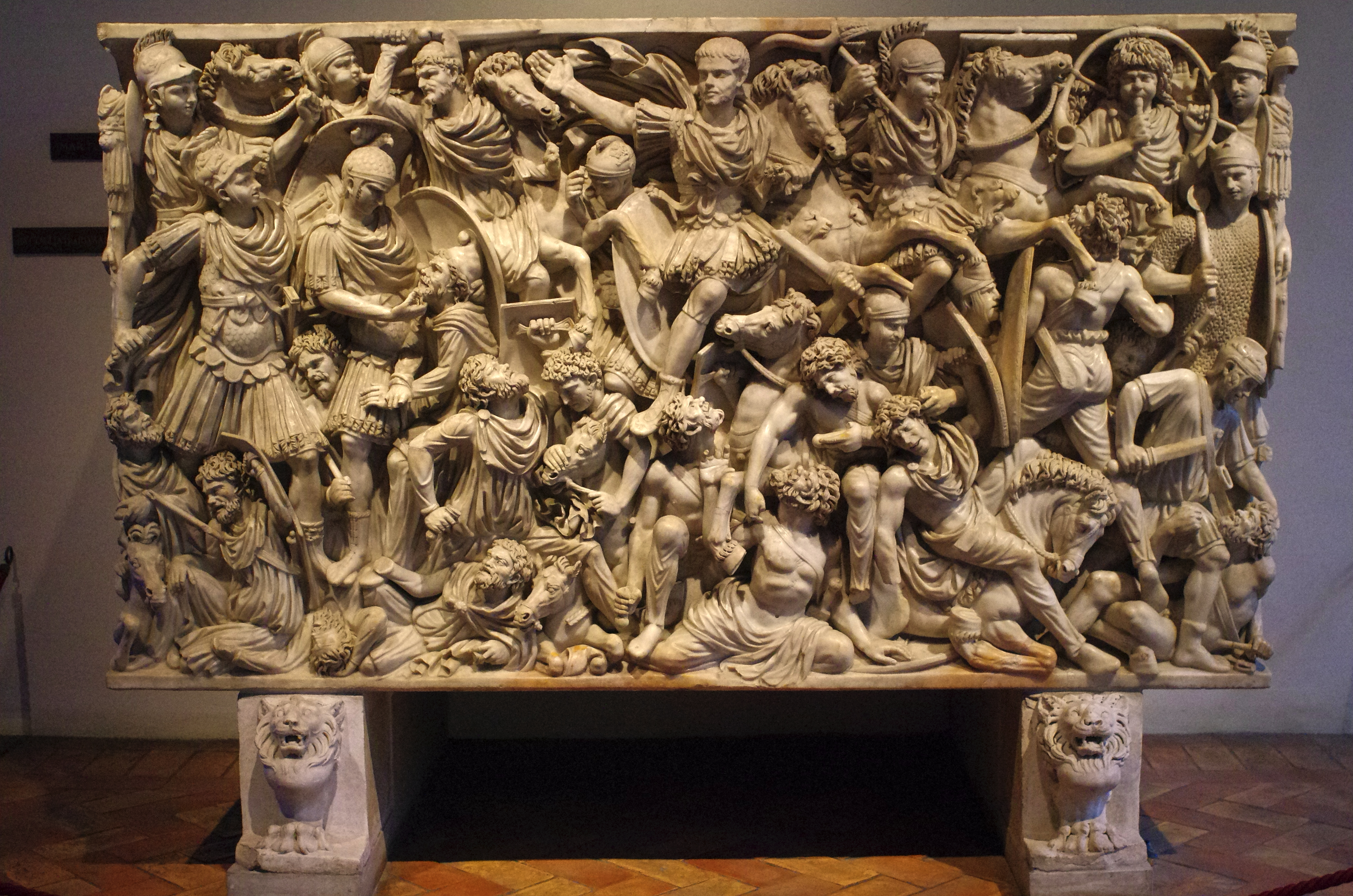
Depiction of Romans fighting Goths on the Ludovisi Battle sarcophagus (c. 250–260 CE)

The period after the Marcomannic Wars saw the emergence of peoples with new names along the Roman frontiers, which were probably formed by the merger of smaller groups. These new confederacies or peoples tended to border the Roman imperial frontier. Many ethnic names from earlier periods disappear. The Alamanni emerged along the upper Rhine and are mentioned in Roman sources from the third century onward. The Goths begin to be mentioned along the lower Danube, where they attacked the city of Histria in 238. The Franks are first mentioned occupying territory between the Rhine and Weser. The Lombards seem to have moved their center of power to the central Elbe. Groups such as the Alamanni, Goths, and Franks were not unified polities; they formed multiple, loosely associated groups, who often fought each other and some of whom sought Roman friendship. The Romans also begin to mention seaborne attacks by the Saxons, a term used generically in Latin for Germanic-speaking pirates. A system of defenses on both sides of the English Channel, the Saxon Shore, was established to deal with their raids.

From 250 onward, the Gothic peoples formed the "single most potent threat to the northern frontier of Rome". In 250 CE a Gothic king Cniva led Goths with Bastarnae, Carpi, Vandals, and Taifali into the empire, laying siege to Philippopolis. He followed his victory there with another on the marshy terrain at Abrittus, a battle which cost the life of Roman emperor Decius. In 253/254, further attacks occurred reaching Thessalonica and possibly Thrace. In 267/268 there were large raids led by the Herules in 267/268, and a mixed group of Goths and Herules in 269/270. Gothic attacks were abruptly ended in the years after 270, after a Roman victory in which the Gothic king Cannabaudes was killed.

The Roman limes largely collapsed in 259/260, during the Crisis of the Third Century (235–284), and Germanic raids penetrated as far as northern Italy. The limes on the Rhine and upper Danube was brought under control again in 270s, and by 300 the Romans had reestablished control over areas they had abandoned during the crisis. From the later third century onward, the Roman army relied increasingly on troops of Barbarian origin, often recruited from Germanic peoples, with some functioning as senior commanders in the Roman army. In the 4th century, warfare along the Rhine frontier between the Romans and Franks and Alemanni seems to have mostly consisted of campaigns of plunder, during which major battles were avoided. The Romans generally followed a policy of trying to prevent strong leaders from emerging among the barbarians, using treachery, kidnapping, and assassination, paying off rival tribes to attack them, or by supporting internal rivals.

=== Migration Period (c. 375–568) ===
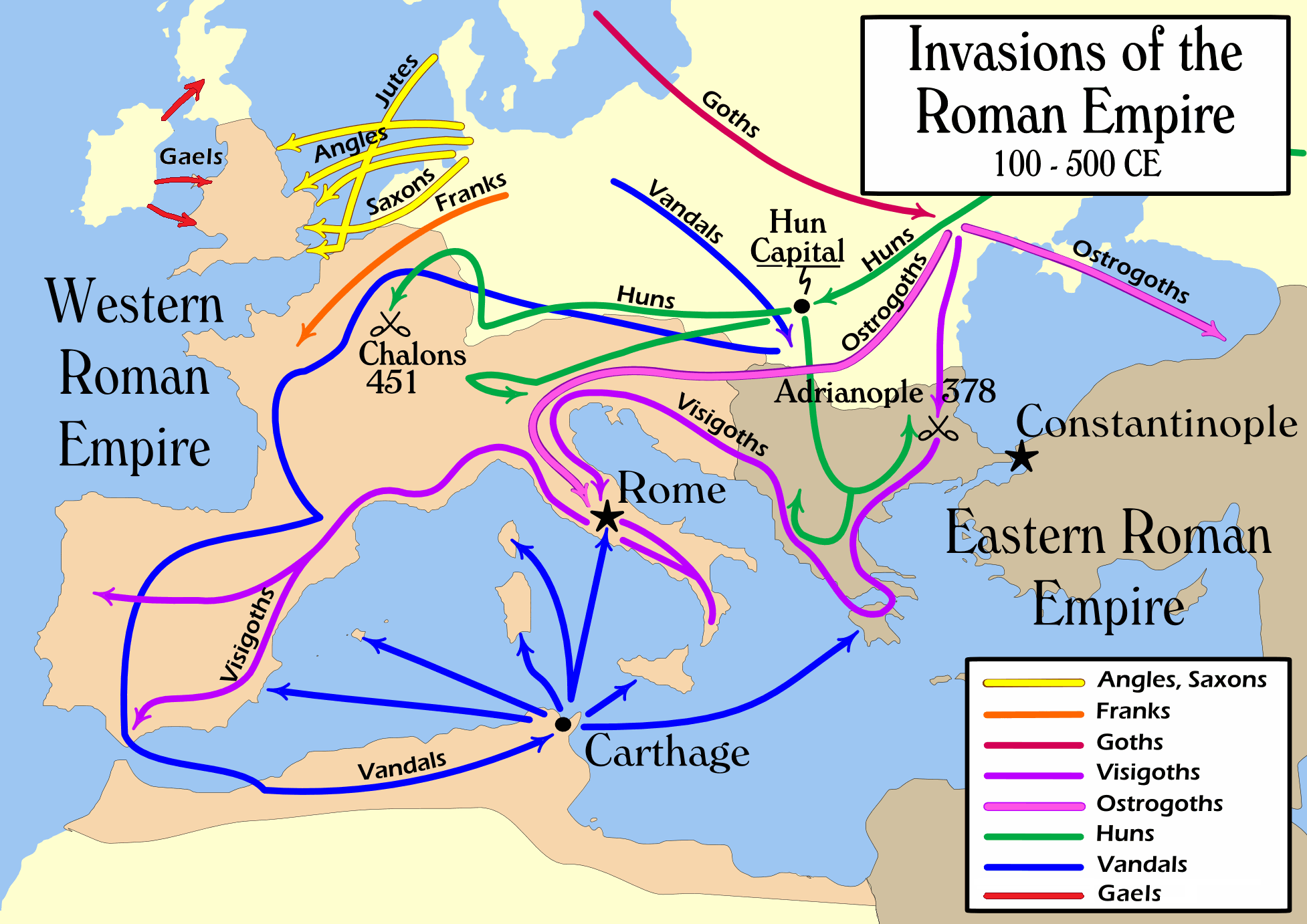
2nd century to 6th century simplified migrations

The Migration Period is traditionally cited by historians as beginning in 375 CE, under the assumption that the appearance of the Huns prompted the Visigoths to seek shelter within the Roman Empire in 376. The end of the migration period is usually set at 568 when the Lombards invaded Italy. During this time period, numerous barbarian groups invaded the Roman Empire and established new kingdoms within its boundaries. These Germanic migrations traditionally mark the transition between antiquity and the beginning of the early Middle Ages. The reasons for the migrations of the period are unclear, but scholars have proposed overpopulation, climate change, bad harvests, famines, and adventurousness as possible reasons. Migrations were probably carried out by relatively small groups rather than entire peoples.

==== Early Migration Period (before 375–420) ====
The Greuthungi, a Gothic group in modern Ukraine under the rule of Ermanaric, were among the first peoples attacked by the Huns, apparently facing Hunnic pressure for some years. Following Ermanaric's death, the Greuthungi's resistance broke and they moved toward the Dniester river. A second Gothic group, the Tervingi under King Athanaric, constructed a defensive earthwork against the Huns near the Dniester. However, these measures did not stop the Huns and the majority of the Tervingi abandoned Athanaric; they subsequently fled—accompanied by a contingent of Greuthungi—to the Danube in 376, seeking asylum in the Roman Empire. The emperor Valens chose only to admit the Tervingi, who were settled in the Roman provinces of Thrace and Moesia.

Due to mistreatment by the Romans, the Tervingi revolted in 377, starting the Gothic War, joined by the Greuthungi. (Note: During the initial stage of the conflict between the Romans and the Tervingi, the Greuthungi had crossed the Danube into the Empire.) The Goths and their allies defeated the Romans first at Marcianople, then defeated and killed emperor Valens in the Battle of Adrianople in 378, destroying two-thirds of Valens' army. Following further fighting, peace was negotiated in 382, granting the Goths considerable autonomy within the Roman Empire. However, these Goths—who would be known as the Visigoths—revolted several more times, finally coming to be ruled by Alaric. In 397, the disunited eastern Empire submitted to some of his demands, possibly giving him control over Epirus. In the aftermath of the large-scale Gothic entries into the empire, the Franks and Alemanni became more secure in their positions in 395, when Stilicho, the barbarian generalissimo who held power in the western Empire, made agreements with them.

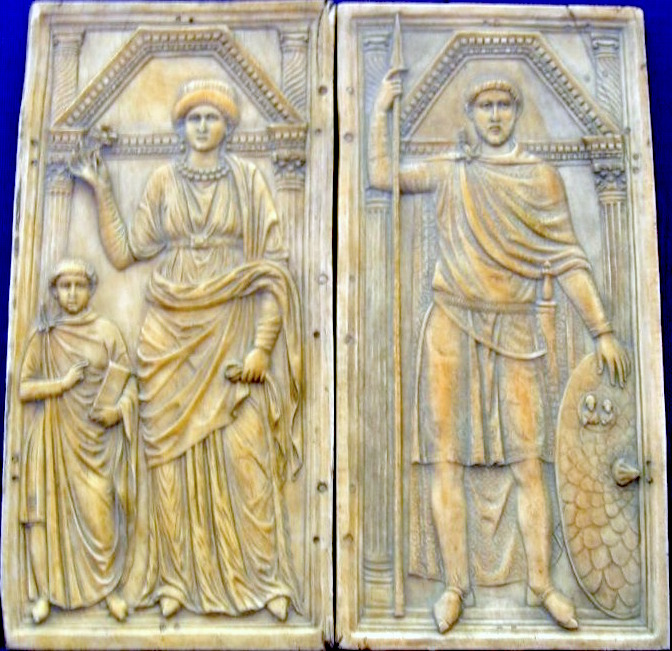
A replica of an ivory diptych probably depicting Stilicho (on the right), the son of a Vandal father and a Roman mother, who became the most powerful man in the Western Roman Empire from 395 to 408 CE

In 401, Alaric invaded Italy, coming to an understanding with Stilicho in 404/5. This agreement allowed Stilicho to fight against the force of Radagaisus, who had crossed the Middle Danube in 405/6 and invaded Italy, only to be defeated outside Florence. That same year, a large force of Vandals, Suevi, Alans, and Burgundians crossed the Rhine, fighting the Franks but facing no Roman resistance. In 409, the Suevi, Vandals, and Alans crossing the Pyrenees into Spain, where they took possession of the northern part of the peninsula. The Burgundians seized the land around modern Speyer, Worms, and Strasbourg, territory that was recognized by the Roman Emperor Honorius. When Stilicho fell from power in 408, Alaric invaded Italy again and eventually sacked Rome in 410; Alaric died shortly thereafter. The Visigoths withdrew into Gaul where they faced a power struggle until the succession of Wallia in 415 and his son Theodoric I in 417/18. Following successful campaigns against them by the Roman emperor Flavius Constantius, the Visigoths were settled as Roman allies in Gaul between modern Toulouse and Bourdeaux.

Other Goths, including those of Athanaric, continued to live outside the empire, with three groups crossing into the Roman territory after the Tervingi. The Huns gradually conquered Gothic groups north of the Danube, of which at least six are known, from 376 to 400. Those in Crimea may never have been conquered. The Gepids also formed an important Germanic people under Hunnic rule; the Huns had largely conquered them by 406. One Gothic group under Hunnic domination was ruled by the Amal dynasty, who would form the core of the Ostrogoths. The situation outside the Roman empire in 410s and 420s is poorly attested, but it is clear that the Huns continued to spread their influence onto the middle Danube.

==== The Hunnic Empire (c. 420–453) ====
In 428, the Vandal leader Geiseric moved his forces across the strait of Gibraltar into north Africa. Within two years, they had conquered most of north Africa. By 434, following a renewed political crisis in Rome, the Rhine frontier had collapsed, and in order to restore it, the Roman magister militum Flavius Aetius engineered the destruction of the Burgundian kingdom in 435/436, possibly with Hunnic mercenaries, and launched several successful campaigns against the Visigoths. In 439, the Vandals conquered Carthage, which served as an excellent base for further raids throughout the Mediterranean and became the basis for the Vandal Kingdom. The loss of Carthage forced Aetius to make peace with the Visigoths in 442, effectively recognizing their independence within the boundaries of the empire. During the resulting peace, Aetius resettled the Burgundians in Sapaudia in southern Gaul. In the 430s, Aetius negotiated peace with the Suevi in Spain, leading to a practical loss of Roman control in the province. Despite the peace, the Suevi expanded their territory by conquering Mérida in 439 and Seville in 441.

By 440, Attila and the Huns had come to rule a multi-ethnic empire north of the Danube; two of the most important peoples within this empire were the Gepids and the Goths. The Gepid king Ardaric came to power around 440 and participated in various Hunnic campaigns. In 450, the Huns interfered in a Frankish succession dispute, leading in 451 to an invasion of Gaul. Aetius, by uniting a coalition of Visigoths, part of the Franks, and others, was able to defeat the Hunnic army at the Battle of the Catalaunian Plains. In 453, Attila died unexpectedly, and an alliance led by Ardaric's Gepids rebelled against the rule of his sons, defeating them in the Battle of Nedao. Either before or after Attila's death, Valamer, a Gothic ruler of the Amal dynasty, seems to have consolidated power over a large part of the Goths in the Hunnic domain. For the next 20 years, the former subject peoples of the Huns would fight among each other for preeminence.

The arrival of the Saxons in Britain is traditionally dated to 449, however, archaeology indicates they had begun arriving in Britain earlier. Latin sources used Saxon generically for seaborne raiders, meaning that not all of the invaders belonged to the continental Saxons. According to the British monk Gildas (c. 500 – c. 570), this group had been recruited to protect the Romano-British from the Picts, but had revolted. They quickly established themselves as rulers on the eastern part of the island.

==== After the death of Attila (453–568) ====
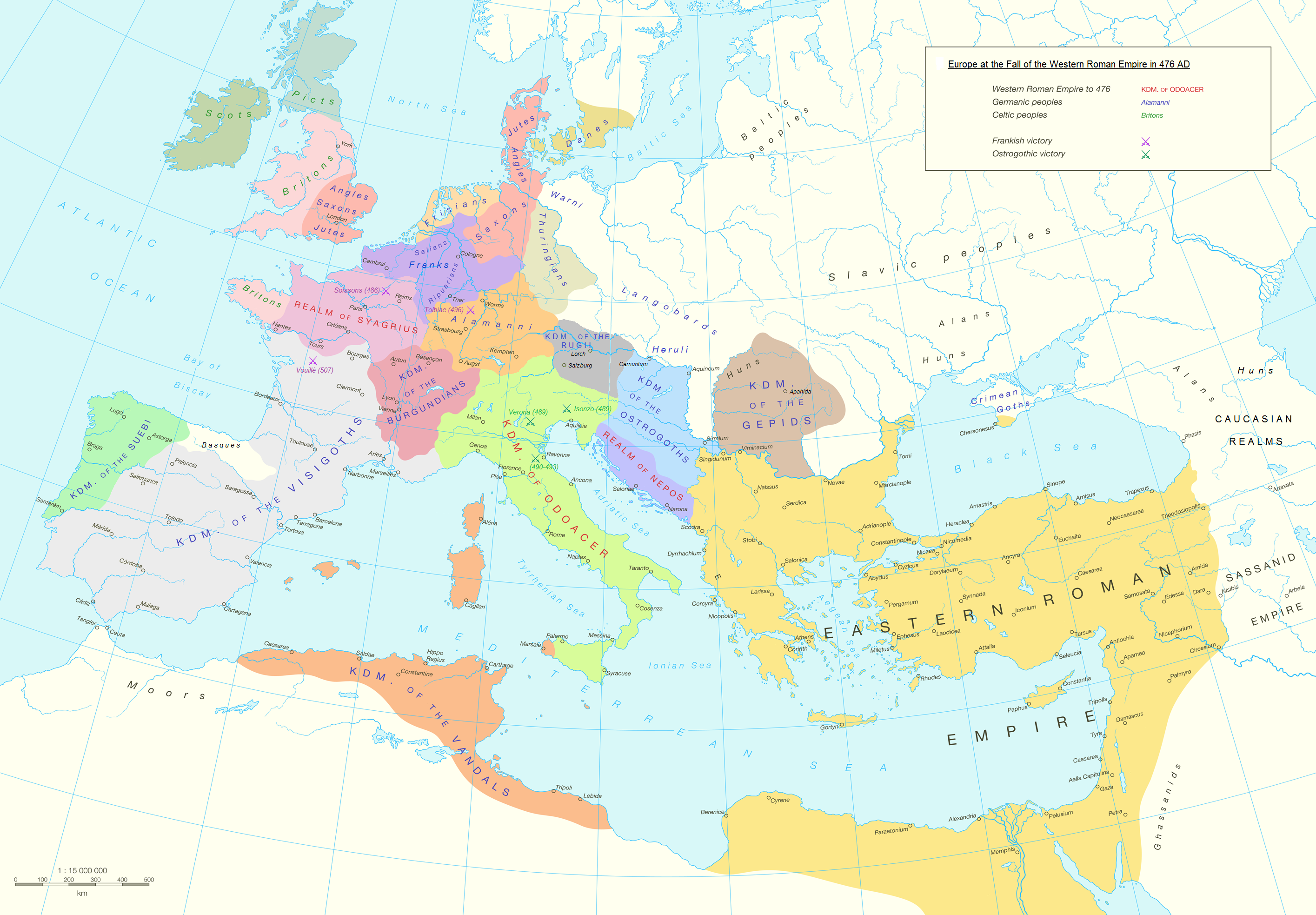
Barbarian kingdoms and peoples after the end of the Western Roman Empire in 476 CE

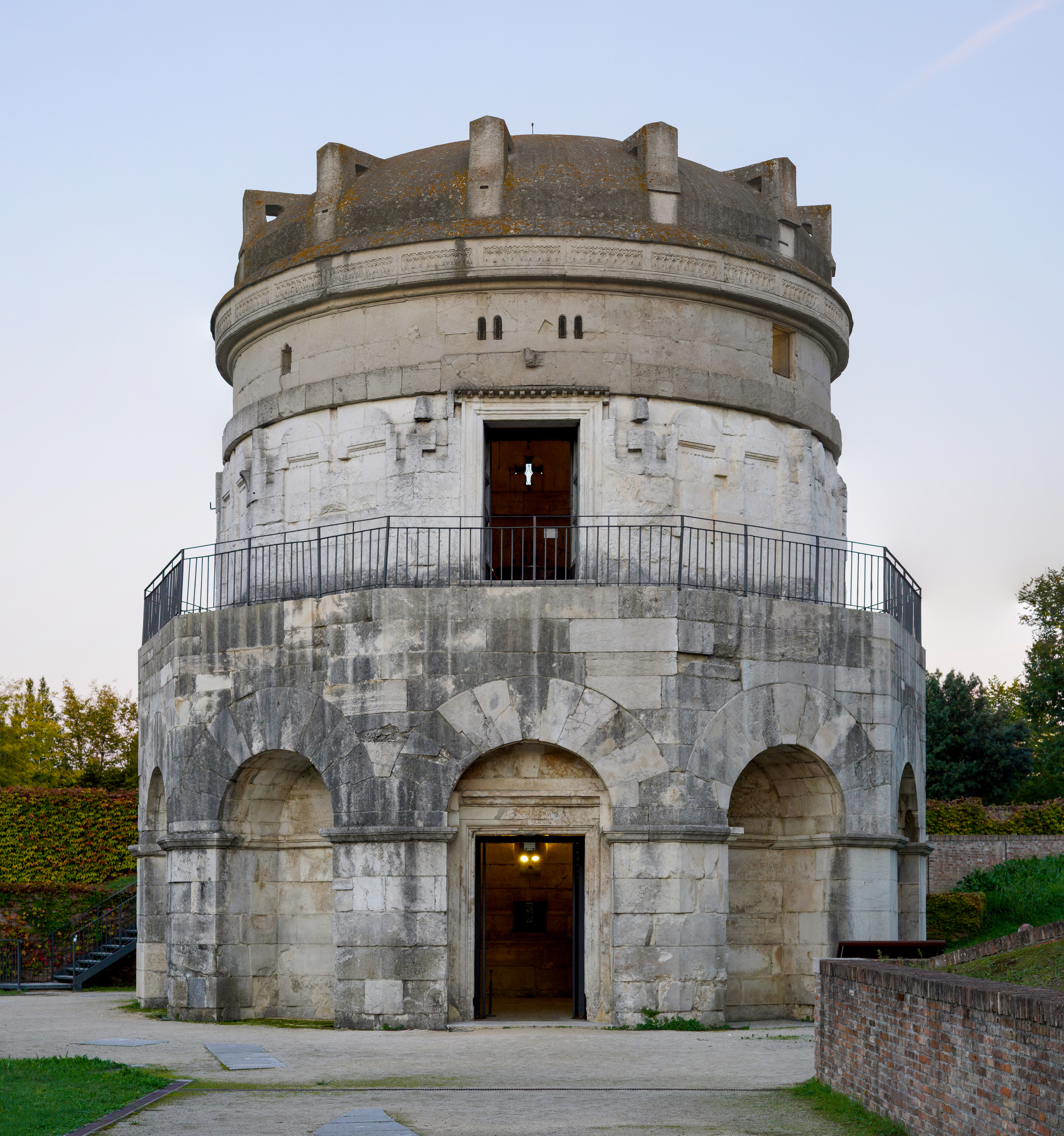
Mausoleum of Theodoric the Great

In 455, in the aftermath of the death of Aetius in 453 and the murder of emperor Valentinian III in 455, the Vandals invaded Italy and sacked Rome in 455. In 456, the Romans persuaded the Visigoths to fight the Suevi, who had broken their treaty with Rome. The Visigoths and a force of Burgundians and Franks defeated the Suevi at the Battle of Campus Paramus, reducing Suevi control to northwestern Spain. The Visigoths went on to conquer all of the Iberian Peninsula by 484 except a small part that remained under Suevian control.

The Ostrogoths, led by Valamer's brother Thiudimer, invaded the Balkans in 473. Thiudimer's son Theodoric succeeded him in 476. In that same year, a barbarian commander in the Roman Italian army, Odoacer, mutinied and removed the final western Roman emperor, Romulus Augustulus. Odoacer ruled Italy for himself, largely continuing the policies of Roman imperial rule. He destroyed the Kingdom of the Rugians, in modern Austria, in 487/488. Theodoric, meanwhile, successfully extorted the Eastern Empire through a series of campaigns in the Balkans. The eastern emperor Zeno agreed to send Theodoric to Italy in 487/8. After a successful invasion, Theodoric killed and replaced Odoacer in 493, founding a new Ostrogothic kingdom. Theodoric died in 526, amid increasing tensions with the eastern empire.

Toward the end of the migration period, in the early 500s, Roman sources portray a completely changed ethnic landscape outside of the empire: the Marcomanni and Quadi disappeared, as had the Vandals. Instead, the Thuringians, Rugians, Sciri, Herules, Goths, and Gepids are mentioned as occupying the Danube frontier. From the mid-5th century onward, the Alamanni had greatly expanded their territory in all directions and launched numerous raids into Gaul. The territory under the Frankish influence had grown to encompass northern Gaul and Germania to the Elbe. The Frankish king Clovis I united the various Frankish groups in 490s, and conquered the Alamanni by 506. From the 490s onward, Clovis waged wars against the Visigoths, defeating them in 507 and taking control of most of Gaul. Clovis's heirs conquered the Thuringians by 530 and the Burgundians by 532. The continental Saxons, composed of many subgroups, were made tributary to the Franks, as were the Frisians, who faced an attack by the Danes under Hygelac in 533.

The Vandal and Ostrogothic kingdoms were destroyed in 534 and 555 respectively by the Eastern Roman (Byzantine) empire under Justinian. Around 500, a new ethnic identity appears in modern southern Germany, the Baiuvarii (Bavarians), under the patronage of Theodoric's Ostrogothic kingdom and then of the Franks. The Lombards, moving out of Bohemia, destroyed the kingdom of the Heruli in Pannonia in 510. In 568, after destroying the Gepid kingdom, the last Germanic kingdom in the Carpathian basin, the Lombards under Alboin invaded northern Italy, eventually conquering most of it. This invasion has traditionally been regarded as the end of the migration period. The eastern part of Germania, formerly inhabited by the Goths, Gepids, Vandals, and Rugians, was gradually Slavicized, a process enabled by the invasion of the nomadic Avars.

=== Early Middle Ages to c. 800 ===
Frankish expansion from the early kingdom of Clovis I (481) to the divisions of Charlemagne's Empire (843–870)

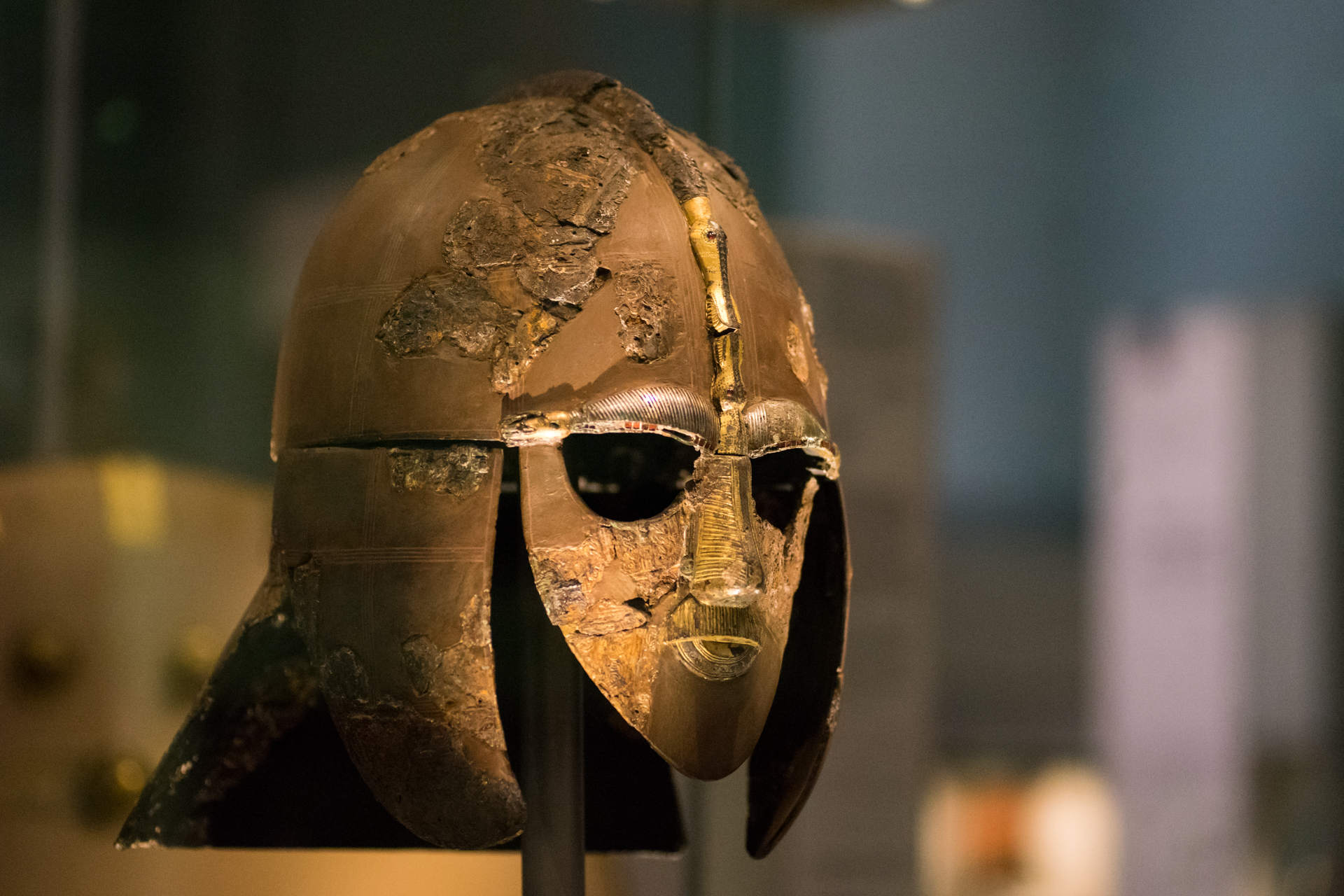
The Sutton Hoo helmet from c. 625 in the British Museum

Merovingian Frankia became divided into three subkingdoms: Austrasia in the east around the Rhine and Meuse, Neustria in the west around Paris, and Burgundy in the southeast around Chalon-sur-Saône. The Franks ruled a multilingual and multi-ethnic kingdom, divided between a mostly Romance-speaking West and a mostly Germanic-speaking east, that integrated former Roman elites but remained centered on a Frankish ethnic identity. In 687, the Pippinids came to control the Merovingian rulers as mayors of the palace in Neustria. Under their direction, the subkingdoms of Frankia were reunited. Following the mayoralty of Charles Martel, the Pippinids replaced the Merovingians as kings in 751, when Charles's son Pepin the Short became king and founded the Carolingian dynasty. His son, Charlemagne, would go on to conquer the Lombards, Saxons, and Bavarians. Charlemagne was crowned Roman emperor in 800 and regarded his residence of Aachen as the new Rome.

Following their invasion in 568, the Lombards quickly conquered larger parts of the Italian peninsula. From 574 to 584, a period without a single Lombard ruler, the Lombards nearly collapsed, until a more centralized Lombard polity emerged under King Agilulf in 590. The invading Lombards only ever made up a very small percentage of the Italian population, however Lombard ethnic identity expanded to include people of both Roman and barbarian descent. Lombard power reached its peak during the reign of King Liutprand (712–744). After Liutprand's death, the Frankish King Pippin the Short invaded in 755, greatly weakening the kingdom. The Lombard kingdom was finally annexed by Charlemagne in 773.

After a period of weak central authority, the Visigothic kingdom came under the rule of Liuvigild, who conquered the Kingdom of the Suebi in 585. A Visigothic identity that was distinct from the Romance-speaking population they ruled had disappeared by 700, with the removal of all legal differences between the two groups. In 711, a Muslim army landed at Grenada; the entire Visigothic kingdom would be conquered by the Umayyad Caliphate by 725.

In what would become England, the Anglo-Saxons were divided into several competing kingdoms, the most important of which were Northumbria, Mercia, and Wessex. In the 7th century, Northumbria established overlordship over the other Anglo-Saxon Kingdoms, until Mercia revolted under Wulfhere in 658. Subsequently, Mercia would establish dominance until 825 with the death of King Cenwulf. Few written sources report on Vendel period Scandinavia from 400 to 700, however this period saw profound societal changes and the formation of early states with connections to the Anglo-Saxon and Frankish kingdoms. In 793, the first recorded Viking raid occurred at Lindisfarne, ushering in the Viking Age.

== Religion ==
=== Germanic paganism ===
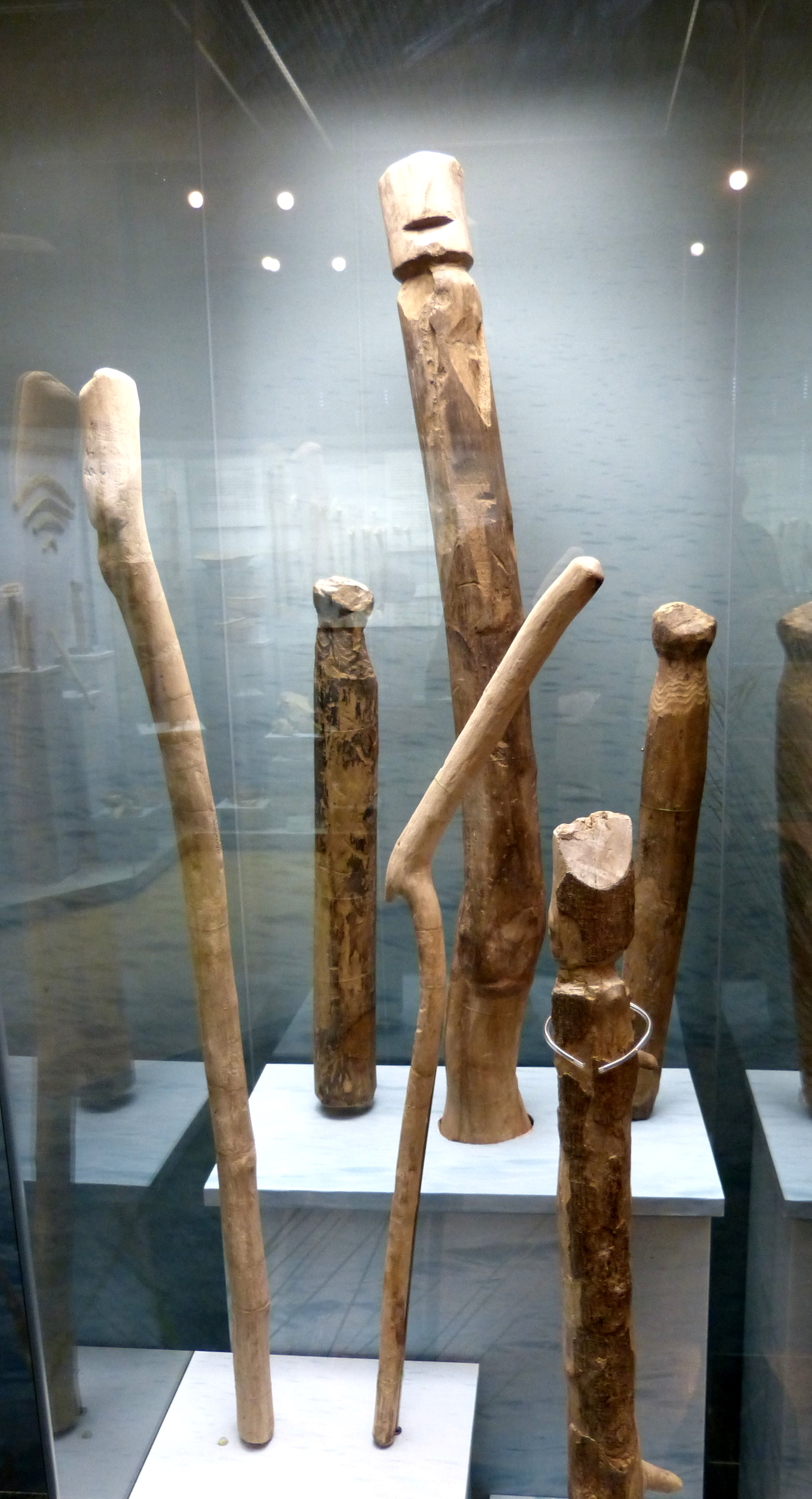
Wooden idols from Oberdorla moor, modern Thuringia. The idols were found in context with animal bones and other evidence of sacrificial rites.

Germanic paganism refers to the traditional, culturally significant religion of the Germanic-speaking peoples. It did not form a uniform religious system across Germanic-speaking Europe, but varied from place to place, people to people, and time to time. In many contact areas (e.g. Rhineland and eastern and northern Scandinavia), it was similar to neighboring religions such as those of the Slavs, Celts, and Finnic peoples. The term is sometimes applied as early as the Stone Age, Bronze Age, or the earlier Iron Age, but it is more generally restricted to the time period after the Germanic languages had become distinct from other Indo-European languages. From the first reports in Roman sources to the final conversion to Christianity, Germanic paganism thus covers a period of around one thousand years. Scholars are divided as to the degree of continuity between the religious practices of the earlier Germanic peoples and those attested in later Norse paganism and elsewhere: while some scholars argue that Tacitus, early medieval sources, and the Norse sources indicate religious continuity, other scholars are highly skeptical of such arguments.

Like their neighbors and other historically related peoples, the ancient Germanic peoples venerated numerous indigenous deities. These deities are attested throughout literature authored by or written about Germanic-speaking peoples, including runic inscriptions, contemporary written accounts, and in folklore after Christianization. As an example, the second of the two Merseburg charms (two Old High German examples of alliterative verse from a manuscript dated to the ninth century) mentions six deities: Woden, Balder, Sinthgunt, Sunna, Frija, and Volla.

With the exception of Sinthgunt, proposed cognates to these deities occur in other Germanic languages, such as Old English and Old Norse. By way of the comparative method, philologists are then able to reconstruct and propose early Germanic forms of these names from early Germanic mythology. Compare the following table:

Old High German	Old Norse	Old English	Proto-Germanic reconstruction	Notes
Wuotan	Óðinn	Wōden	*Wōđanaz	A deity similarly associated with healing magic in the Old English Nine Herbs Charm and particular forms of magic throughout the Old Norse record. This deity is strongly associated with extensions of *Frijjō (see below).
Balder	Baldr	Bældæg	*Balđraz	In Old Norse texts, where the only description of the deity occurs, Baldr is a son of the god Odin and is associated with beauty and light.
Sunne	Sól	Sigel	*Sowelō ~ *Sōel	A theonym identical to the proper noun 'Sun'. A goddess and the personified Sun.
Volla	Fulla	Unattested	*Fullōn	A goddess associated with extensions of the goddess *Frijjō (see below). The Old Norse record refers to Fulla as a servant of the goddess Frigg, while the second Merseburg Charm refers to Volla as Friia's sister.
Friia	Frigg	Frīg	*Frijjō	Associated with the goddess Volla/Fulla in both the Old High German and Old Norse records, this goddess is also strongly associated with the god Odin (see above) in both the Old Norse and Langobardic records.

The structure of the magic formula in this charm has a long history prior to this attestation: it is first known to have occurred in Vedic India, where it occurs in the Atharvaveda, dated to around 500 BCE. Numerous other beings common to various groups of ancient Germanic peoples receive mention throughout the ancient Germanic record. One such type of entity, a variety of supernatural women, is also mentioned in the first of the two Merseburg Charms:

Old High German	Old Norse	Old English	Proto-Germanic reconstruction	Notes
itis	dís	ides	*đīsō	A type of goddess-like supernatural entity. The West Germanic forms present some linguistic difficulties but the North Germanic and West Germanic forms are used explicitly as cognates (compare Old English ides Scildinga and Old Norse dís Skjǫldunga).

Other widely attested entities from the North and West Germanic folklore include elves, dwarfs, and the mare. (For more discussion on these entities, see Proto-Germanic folklore.)

The great majority of material describing Germanic mythology stems from the North Germanic record. The body of myths among the North Germanic-speaking peoples is known today as Norse mythology and is attested in numerous works, the most expansive of which are the Poetic Edda and the Prose Edda. While these texts were composed in the 13th century, they frequently quote genres of traditional alliterative verse known today as eddic poetry and skaldic poetry dating to the pre-Christian period.

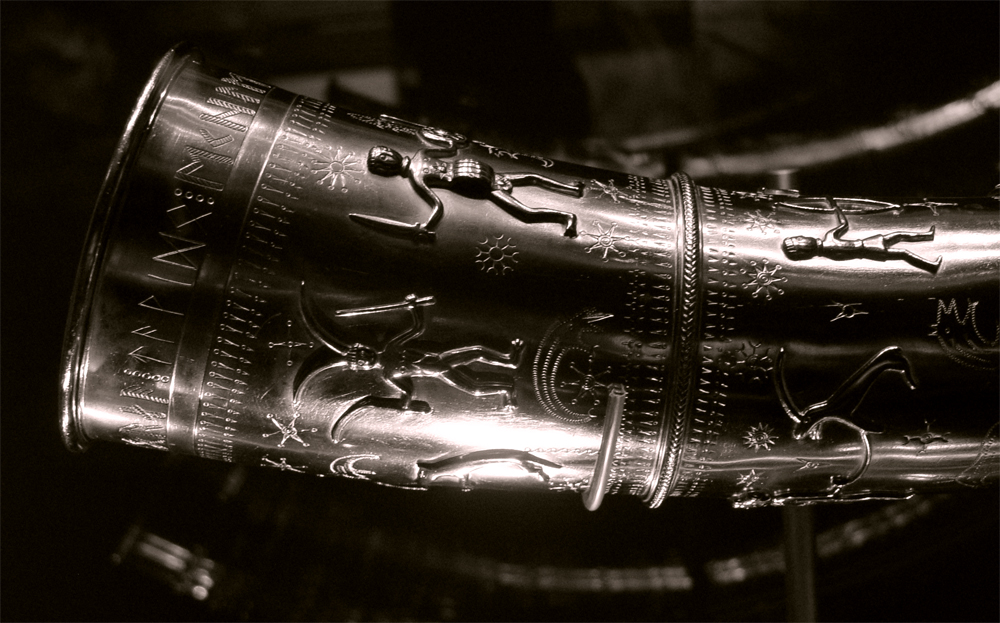
An image of a museum reproduction of one of the two golden horns of Gallehus, found in Denmark and dating to the early fifth century. Composed in Proto-Norse, the Elder Futhark inscription on the horn features the earliest known generally accepted example of Germanic alliterative verse.

West Germanic mythology (that of speakers of, e.g., Old English and Old High German) is comparatively poorly attested. Notable texts include the Old Saxon Baptismal Vow and the Old English Nine Herbs Charm. While most extant references are simply to deity names, some narratives do survive into the present, such as the Lombard origin myth, which details a tradition among the Lombards that features the deities Frea (cognate with Old Norse Frigg) and Godan (cognate with Old Norse Óðinn). Attested in the 7th-century Origo Gentis Langobardorum and the 8th-century Historia Langobardorum from the Italian Peninsula, the narrative strongly corresponds in numerous ways with the prose introduction to the eddic poem Grímnismál, recorded in 13th-century Iceland.

Very few texts make up the corpus of Gothic and other East Germanic languages, and East Germanic paganism and its associated mythic body is especially poorly attested. Notable topics that provide insight into the matter of East Germanic paganism include the Ring of Pietroassa, which appears to be a cult object (see also Gothic runic inscriptions), and the mention of the Gothic Anses (cognate with Old Norse Æsir '(pagan) gods') by Jordanes.

Practices associated with the religion of the ancient Germanic peoples see fewer attestations. However, elements of religious practices are discernable throughout the textual record associated with the ancient Germanic peoples, including a focus on sacred groves and trees, the presence of seeresses, and numerous vocabulary items. The archaeological record has yielded a variety of depictions of deities, a number of them associated with depictions of the ancient Germanic peoples (see Anthropomorphic wooden cult figurines of Central and Northern Europe). Notable from the Roman period are the Matres and Matronae, some having Germanic names, to whom devotional altars were set up in regions of Germania, Eastern Gaul, and Northern Italy (with a small distribution elsewhere) that were occupied by the Roman army from the first to the fifth century.

Germanic mythology and religious practice is of particular interest to Indo-Europeanists, scholars who seek to identify aspects of ancient Germanic culture—both in terms of linguistic correspondence and by way of motifs—stemming from Proto-Indo-European culture, including Proto-Indo-European mythology. The primordial being Ymir, attested solely in Old Norse sources, makes for a commonly cited example. In Old Norse texts, the death of this entity results in creation of the cosmos, a complex of motifs that finds strong correspondence elsewhere in the Indo-European sphere, notably in Vedic mythology.

=== Conversion to Christianity ===
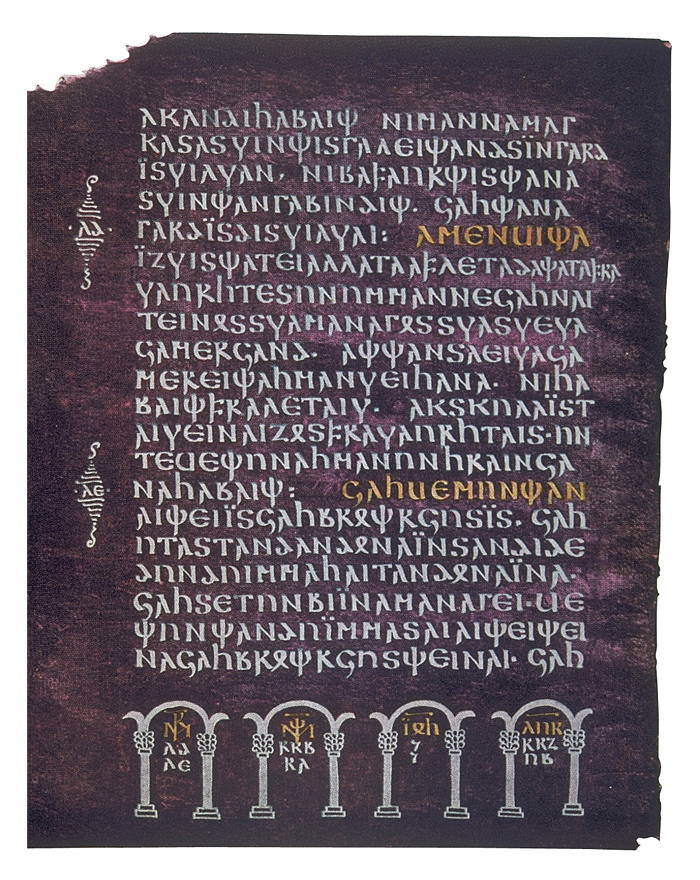
Page from the Codex Argenteus containing the Gothic Bible translated by Wulfila

Germanic peoples began entering the Roman Empire in large numbers at the same time that Christianity was spreading there, and this connection was a major factor encouraging conversion. The East Germanic peoples, the Langobards, and the Suevi in Spain converted to Arian Christianity, a form of Christianity that believed that God the Father was superior to God the Son. The first Germanic people to convert to Arianism were the Visigoths, at the latest in 376 when they entered the Roman Empire. This followed a longer period of missionary work by both Orthodox Christians and Arians, such as the Arian Wulfila, who was made missionary bishop of the Goths in 341 and translated the Bible into Gothic. The Arian Germanic peoples all eventually converted to Nicene Christianity, which had become the dominant form of Christianity within the Roman Empire; the last to convert were the Visigoths in Spain under their king Reccared in 587.

The areas of the Roman Empire conquered by the Franks, Alemanni, and Baiuvarii were mostly Christian already, but it appears that Christianity declined there. In 496, the Frankish king Clovis I converted to Nicene Christianity. This began a period of missionizing within Frankish territory. The Anglo-Saxons gradually converted following a mission sent by Pope Gregory the Great in 595. In the 7th century, Frankish-supported missionary activity spread out of Gaul, led by figures of the Anglo-Saxon mission such as Saint Boniface. The Saxons initially rejected Christianization, but were eventually forcibly converted by Charlemagne as a result of their conquest in the Saxon Wars in 776/777.

While attempts to convert the Scandinavian peoples began in 831, they were mostly unsuccessful until the 10th and 11th centuries. The last Germanic people to convert were the Swedes, although the Geats had converted earlier. The pagan Temple at Uppsala seems to have continued to exist into the early 1100s.

== Society and culture ==
=== Runic writing ===
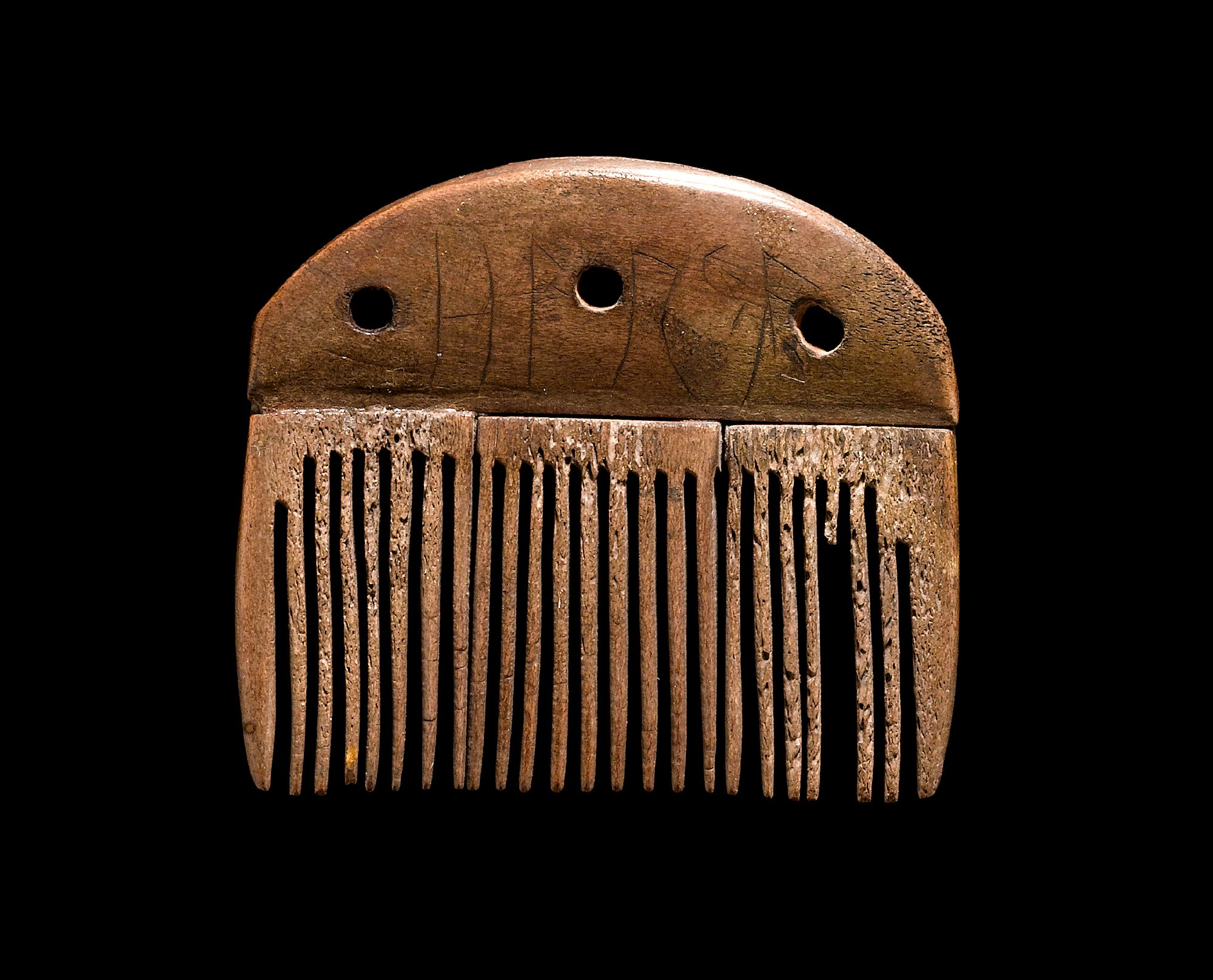
The Vimose Comb, housed at the National Museum of Denmark and dating to around from c. 160 CE, bears the oldest generally accepted runic inscription.

Germanic speakers developed a native script, the runes (or the fuþark), and the earliest known form of which consists of 24 characters. The runes are generally held to have been used exclusively by Germanic-speaking populations. (Note: "The indigenous ancient alphabet of Germania, the fuþark, consisted of twenty-four characters named runes." "The discovery of a rune-inscribed bone from Lány (Břeclav, Moravia/Czech Republic) challenges the prevalent opinion that the older fuþark was used exclusively by Germanic-speaking populations.") All known early runic inscriptions are found in Germanic contexts with the potential exception of one inscription, which may indicate cultural transfer between the Germanic speakers to Slavic speakers (and may potentially be the earliest known writing among Slavic speakers). (Note: "Runes are an alphabetic script, called fuþark, used among Germanic tribes ... The find reported here renders six of the last eight runes of the older fuþark, making it the first find containing the final part of the older fuþark in South-Germanic inscriptions, and the only one found in a non-Germanic context.")

Like other indigenous scripts of Europe, the runes ultimately developed from the Phoenician alphabet, but unlike similar scripts, the runes were not replaced by the Latin alphabet by the first century BCE. Runes remained in use among the Germanic peoples throughout their history despite the significant influence of Rome. (Note: "For unknown reasons the Latin, or Roman, alphabet was not adapted in the North, but instead an alphabet was created that reflected Roman influence, but deviated in crucial features. History of writing in the Mediterranean area shows that there were many indigenous scripts, all somehow descending from the Phoenician mother script, but they were all replaced in ultimately the first century BC by the Roman script, the writing system of the leading culture.")

The precise date that Germanic speakers developed the runic alphabet is unknown, with estimates varying from 100 BCE to 100 CE. Generally accepted inscriptions in the oldest attested form of the script, called the Elder Futhark, date from 200 to 700 CE. The word rune is widely attested among Germanic languages, where it developed from Proto-Germanic *rūna and held a primary meaning of 'secret', but also other meanings such as 'whisper', 'mystery', 'closed deliberation', and 'council'. In most cases, runes appear not to have been used for everyday communication and knowledge of them may have generally been limited to a small group, for whom the term erilaR is attested from the sixth century onward.

The letters of the Elder Futhark are arranged in an order called the futhark, named after its first six characters. The alphabet is supposed to have been extremely phonetic, and each letter could also represent a word or concept, so that, for instance, the f-rune also stood for *fehu ('livestock, personal property'). Such examples are known as ideographic runes. Runic inscriptions are found on organic materials such as wood, bone, horn, ivory, and animal hides, as well as on stone and metal. Inscriptions tend to be short, and are difficult to interpret as profane or magical. They include names, inscriptions by the maker of an object, memorials to the dead, as well as inscriptions that are religious or magical in nature.

=== Personal names ===
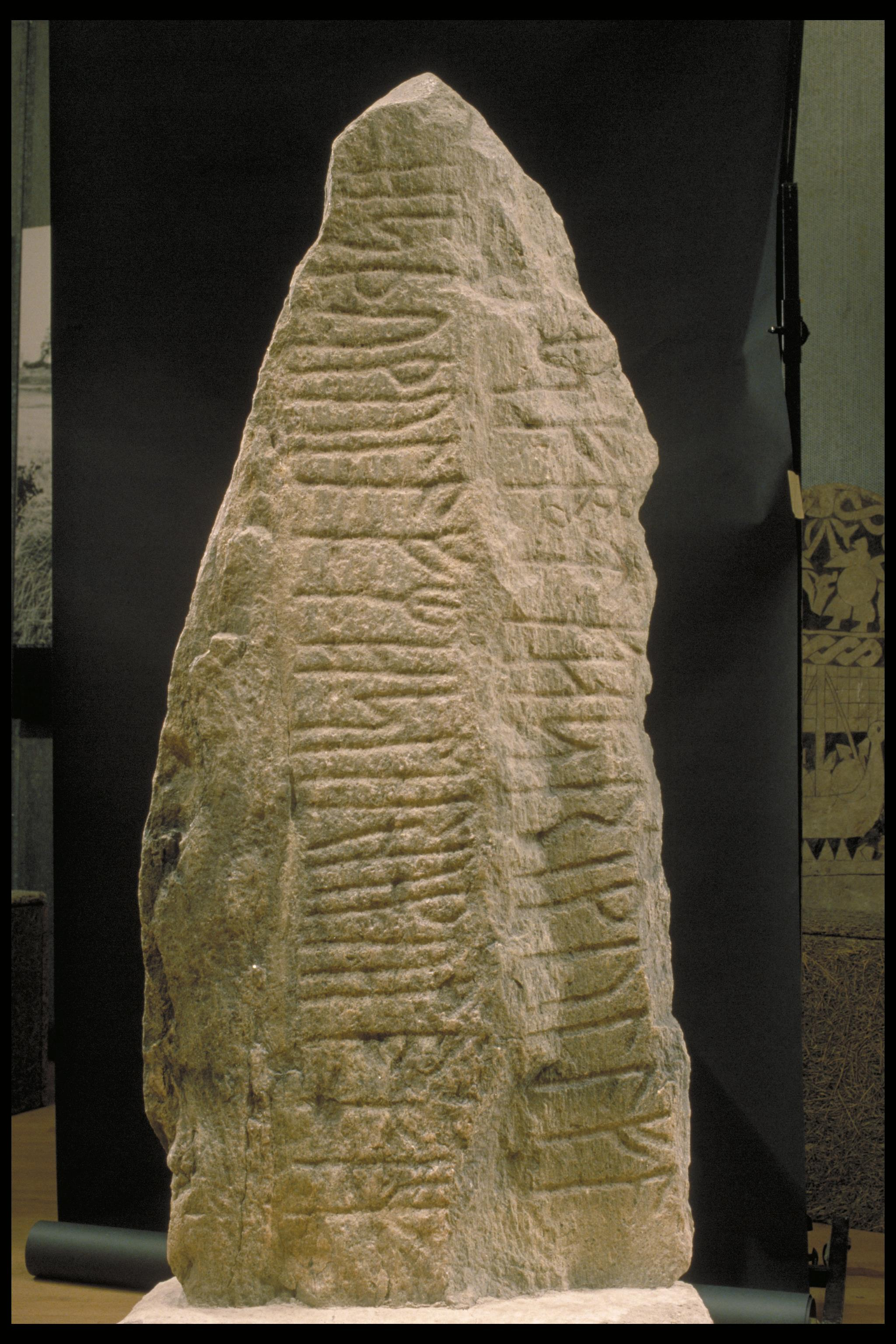
The Istaby Stone (DR359) is a runestone that features a Proto-Norse Elder Futhark inscription describing three generations of men. Their names share the common element of 'wolf' (wulfaz) and alliterate.

Germanic personal names are commonly dithematic, consisting of two components that may be combined freely (such as the Old Norse female personal name Sigríðr, consisting of sigr 'victory' + fríðr 'beloved'). As summarized by Per Vikstrand, "The old Germanic personal names are, from a social and ideological point of view, characterized by three main features: religion, heroism, and family bonds. The religious aspect [of Germanic names] seems to be an inherited, Indo-European trace, which the Germanic languages share with Greek and other Indo-European languages."

One point of debate surrounding Germanic name-giving practice is whether name elements were considered semantically meaningful when combined. Whatever the case, an element of a name could be inherited by a male or female's offspring, leading to an alliterative lineage (related, see alliterative verse). The runestone D359 in Istaby, Sweden provides one such example, where three generations of men are connected by way of the element *wulfaz, meaning 'wolf' (the alliterative Haþuwulfaz, *Heruwulfaz, and Hariwulfaz). Sacral components to Germanic personal names are also attested, including elements such as *hailaga- and *wīha- (both usually translated as 'holy, sacred', see for example Vé), and deity names (theonyms). Deity names as first components of personal names are attested primarily in Old Norse names, where they commonly reference in particular the god Thor (Old Norse Þórr).

=== Poetry and legend ===
The ancient Germanic-speaking peoples were a largely oral culture. Written literature in Germanic languages is not recorded until the 6th century (Gothic Bible) or the 8th century in modern England and Germany. The philologist Andreas Heusler proposed the existence of various genres of literature in the "Old Germanic" period, which were largely based on genres found in high medieval Old Norse poetry. These include ritual poetry, epigrammatic poetry (Spruchdichtung), memorial verses (Merkdichtung), lyric, narrative poetry, and praise poetry. Heinrich Beck suggests that, on the basis of Latin mentions in late antiquity and the early Middle Ages, the following genres can be adduced: origo gentis (the origin of a people or their rulers), the fall of heroes (casus heroici), praise poetry, and laments for the dead.

Some stylistic aspects of later Germanic poetry appear to have origins in the Indo-European period, as shown by comparison with ancient Greek and Sanskrit poetry. Originally, the Germanic-speaking peoples shared a metrical and poetic form, alliterative verse, which is attested in very similar forms in Old Saxon, Old High German and Old English, and in a modified form in Old Norse. Alliterative verse is not attested in the small extant Gothic corpus. The poetic forms diverge among the different languages from the 9th century onward.

Later Germanic peoples shared a common legendary tradition. These heroic legends mostly involve historical personages who lived during the migration period (4th–6th centuries CE), placing them in highly ahistorical and mythologized settings; (Note: Historian Shami Ghosh for instance, argues: "It is certainly the case that the Goths, Lombards, Franks, Angles, Saxons, and Burgundians...were all Germanic peoples, in that their vernacular tongue belonged to the Germanic sub-group of the Indo-European family of languages. It is also the case that the corpus of what literary scholars define as Germanic heroic poetry does contain narratives that have as a historical core events that took place largely in the period c.300–c.600—insofar as any of these narratives can in fact be related to any sort of historical realities at all. But there is little evidence from before the eighth century, at least, for any sense even of an awareness of an inter-relatedness among these peoples, and certainly not of any perception among them of any significance of such inter-relatedness—any sort of knowledge of and meaning granted to a common 'Germanentum', or 'Germanic-ness', that has any relation to the burden of significance such a concept has borne in modern scholarship. Furthermore, the historical links between the extant heroic texts and any verifiable historical fact are both invariably slender and often quite tenuous, and therefore should not be overvalued.") they originate and develop as part of an oral tradition. Some early Gothic heroic legends are already found in Jordanes' Getica (c. 551). The close link between Germanic heroic legend and Germanic language and possibly poetic devices is shown by the fact that the Germanic speakers in Francia who adopted a Romance language, do not preserve Germanic legends but rather developed their own heroic folklore—excepting the figure of Walter of Aquitaine.

=== Germanic law ===
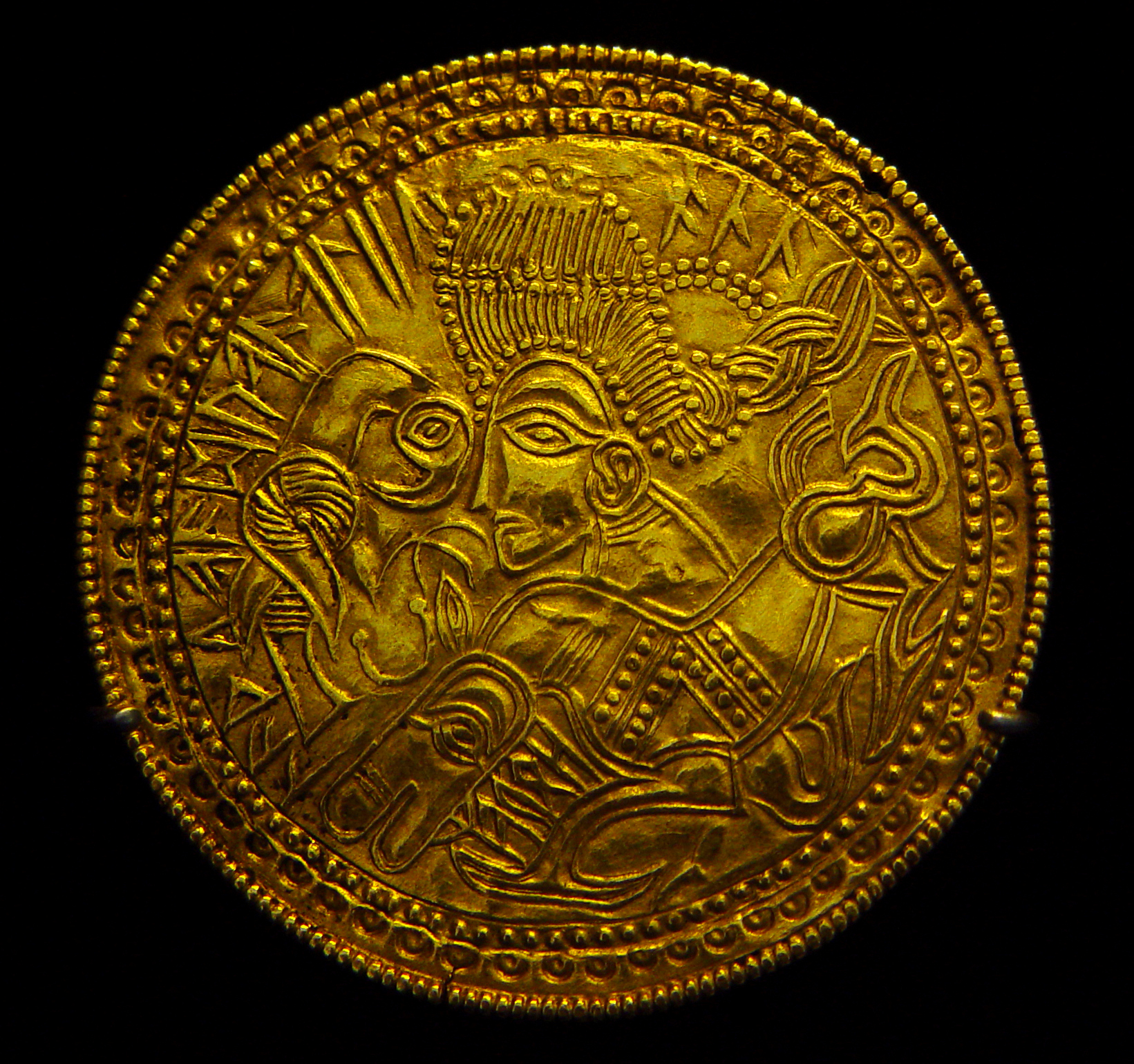
Germanic bracteate from Funen, Denmark

Until the middle of the 20th century, the majority of scholars assumed the existence of a distinct Germanic legal culture and law. Early ideas about Germanic law have come under intense scholarly scrutiny since the 1950s, and specific aspects of it such as the legal importance of Sippe, retinues, and loyalty, and the concept of outlawry can no longer be justified. Besides the assumption of a common Germanic legal tradition and the use of sources of different types from different places and time periods, there are no native sources for early Germanic law. The earliest written legal sources, the Leges Barbarorum, were all written under Roman and Christian influence and often with the help of Roman jurists, and contain large amounts of "Vulgar Latin Law", an unofficial legal system that functioned in the Roman provinces.

As of 2023, scholarly consensus is that Germanic law is best understood in contrast with Roman law, in that whereas Roman law was "learned" and the same across regions, Germanic law was not learned and incorporated regional peculiarities. Common elements include an emphasis on orality, gesture, formulaic language, legal symbolism, and ritual. Some items in the "Leges", such as the use of vernacular words, may reveal aspects of originally Germanic, or at least non-Roman, law. Legal historian Ruth Schmidt-Wiegand writes that this vernacular, often in the form of Latinized words, belongs to "the oldest layers of a Germanic legal language" and shows some similarities to Gothic.

=== Warfare ===
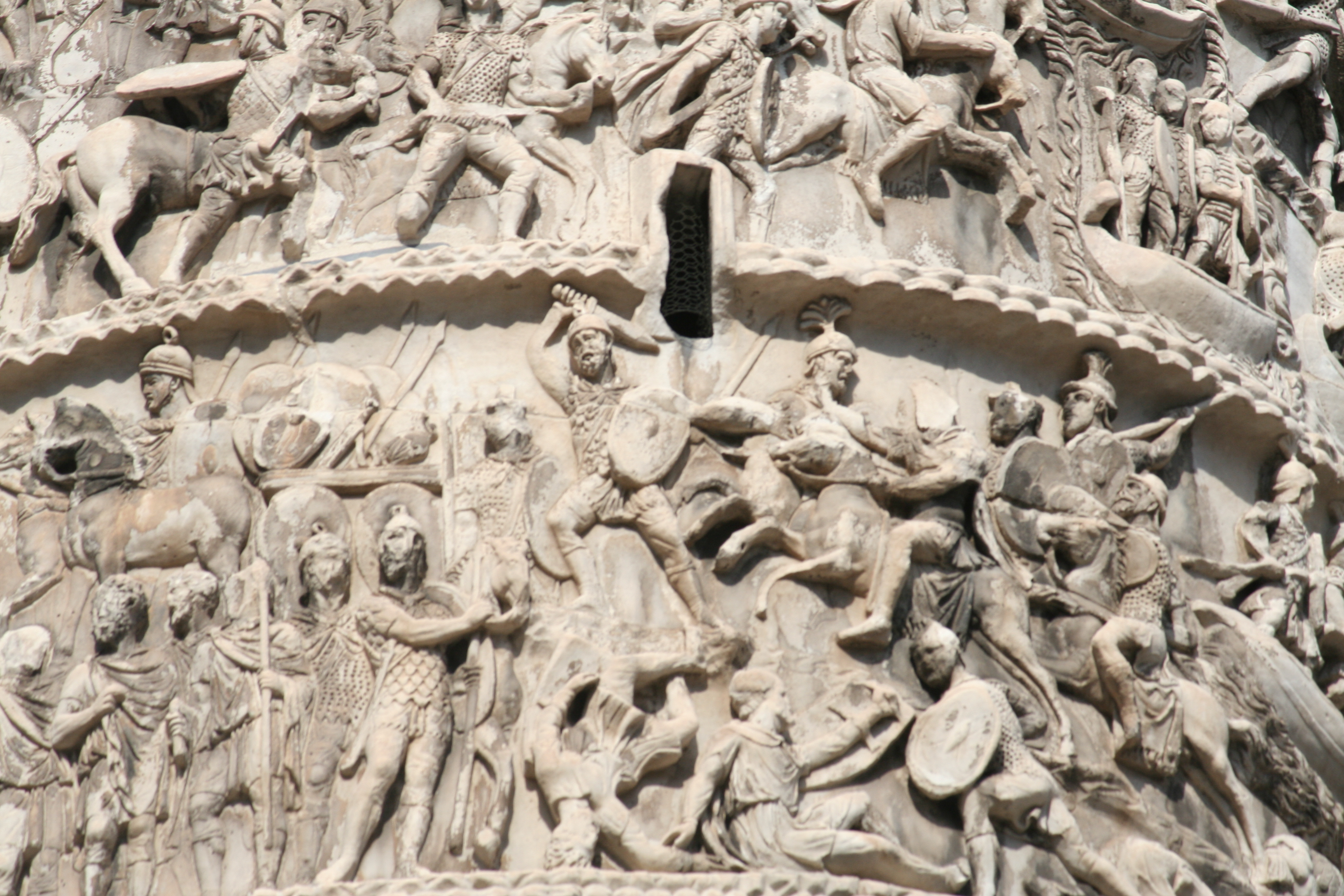
Image of Romans fighting the Marcomanni on the Column of Marcus Aurelius (193 CE)

Warfare seems to have been a constant in Germanic society, including conflicts among and within Germanic peoples. There is no common Germanic word for "war", and it was not necessarily differentiated from other forms of violence. Historical information on Germanic warfare almost entirely depends on Greco-Roman sources, however their accuracy has been questioned. The core of the army was formed by the comitatus (retinue), a group of warriors following a chief. As retinues grew larger, their names could become associated with entire peoples. Many retinues functioned as auxilia (mercenary units in the Roman army).

Roman sources stress, perhaps partially as a literary topos, that the Germanic peoples fought without discipline. Germanic warriors fought mostly on foot, in tight formations in close combat. Tacitus mentions a single formation as used by the Germani, the wedge (Latin: cuneus). Cavalry was rare: in the Roman period, it mostly consisted of chiefs and their immediate retinues, who may have dismounted to fight. However, East Germanic peoples such as the Goths developed cavalry forces armed with lances due to contact with various nomadic peoples. Archaeological finds, mostly in the form of grave goods, indicate that most warriors were armed with spear, shield, and often with swords. Higher status individuals were often buried with spurs for riding. The only archaeological evidence for helmets and chain mail shows them to be of Roman manufacture.

== Economy and material culture ==
=== Agriculture and population density ===
Unlike agriculture in the Roman provinces, which was organized around the large farms known as villae rusticae, Germanic agriculture was organized around villages. When Germanic peoples expanded into northern Gaul in the 4th and 5th centuries CE, they brought this village-based agriculture with them, which increased the agricultural productivity of the land; Heiko Steuer suggests this means that Germania was more agriculturally productive than is generally assumed. Villages were not distant from each other but often within sight, revealing a fairly high population density, and contrary to the assertions of Roman sources, only about 30% of Germania was covered in forest, about the same percentage as today.

Based on pollen samples and the finds of seeds and plant remains, the chief grains cultivated in Germania were barley, oats, and wheat (both Einkorn and emmer), while the most common vegetables were beans and peas. Flax was also grown. Agriculture in Germania relied heavily on animal husbandry, primarily the raising of cattle, which were smaller than their Roman counterparts Both cultivation and animal husbandry methods improved with time, with examples being the introduction of rye, which grew better in Germania, and the introduction of the three-field system.

=== Crafts ===
It is unclear if there was a special class of craftsmen in Germania, however archaeological finds of tools are frequent. Many everyday items such as dishes were made out of wood, and archaeology has found the remains of wooden well construction. The 4th-century CE Nydam and Illerup ships show highly developed knowledge of ship construction, while elite graves have revealed wooden furniture with complex joinery. Products made from ceramics included cooking, drinking, and storage, vessels, as well as lamps. While originally formed by hand, the period around 1 CE saw the introduction of the potter's wheel. Some of the ceramics produced on potter's wheels seem to have been done in direct imitation of Roman wares, and may have been produced by Romans in Germania or by Germani who had learned Roman techniques while serving in the Roman army. The shape and decoration of Germanic ceramics vary by region and archaeologists have traditionally used these variations to determine larger cultural areas. Many ceramics were probably produced locally in hearths, but large pottery kilns have also been discovered, and it seems clear that there were areas of specialized production.

=== Metalworking ===
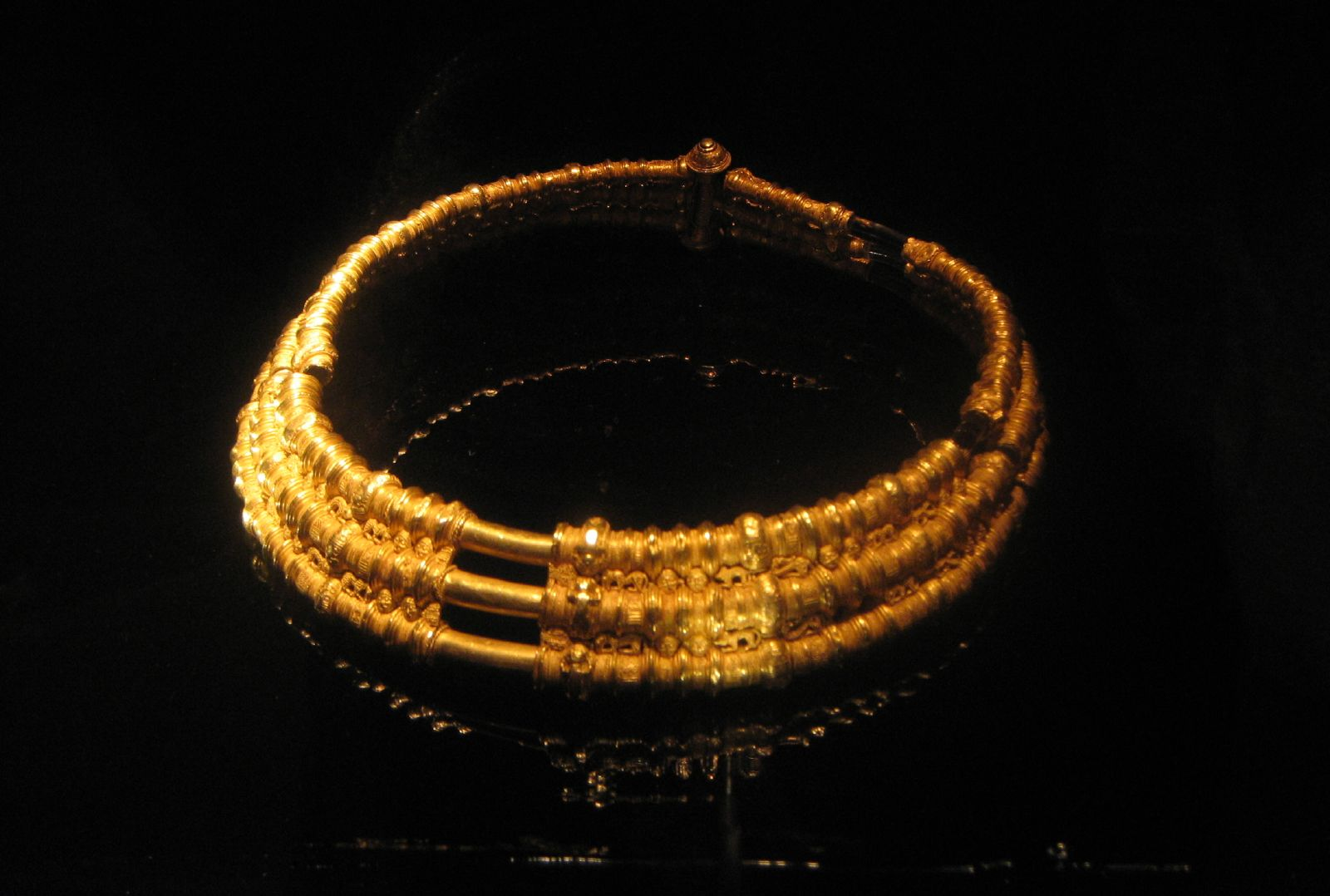
A 5th-century CE gold collar from Ålleberg, Sweden. It displays Germanic filigree work.

Despite the claims of Roman writers such as Tacitus that the Germani had little iron and lacked expertise in working it, deposits of iron were commonly found in Germania and Germanic smiths were skillful metalworkers. Smithies are known from multiple settlements, and smiths were often buried with their tools. An iron mine discovered at Rudki, in the Łysogóry mountains of modern central Poland, operated from the 1st to the 4th centuries CE and included a substantial smelting workshop; similar facilities have been found in Bohemia. The remains of large smelting operations have been discovered by Ribe in Jutland (4th to 6th century CE), as well as at Glienick in northern Germany and at Heeten in the Netherlands (both 4th century CE). Germanic smelting furnaces may have produced metal that was as high-quality as that produced by the Romans. In addition to large-scale production, nearly every individual settlement seems to have produced some iron for local use. Iron was used for agricultural tools, tools for various crafts, and for weapons.

Lead was needed in order to make molds and for the production of jewelry, however it is unclear if the Germani were able to produce lead. While lead mining is known from within the Siegerland across the Rhine from the Roman Empire, it is sometimes theorized that this was the work of Roman miners. Another mine within Germania was near modern Soest, where again it is theorized that lead was exported to Rome. The neighboring Roman provinces of Germania superior and Germania inferior produced a great deal of lead, which has been found stamped as plumbum Germanicum ("Germanic lead") in Roman shipwrecks.

Deposits of gold are not found naturally within Germania and had to either be imported or could be found having naturally washed down rivers. The earliest known gold objects made by Germanic craftsmen are mostly small ornaments dating from the later 1st century CE. Silver working likewise dates from the first century CE, and silver often served as a decorative element with other metals. From the 2nd century onward, increasingly complex gold jewelry was made, often inlaid with precious stones and in a polychrome style. Inspired by Roman metalwork, Germanic craftsmen also began working with gold and silver-gilt foils on belt buckles, jewelry, and weapons. Pure gold objects produced in the late Roman period included torcs with snakeheads, often displaying filigree and cloisonné work, techniques that dominated throughout Germanic Europe.

=== Clothing and textiles ===
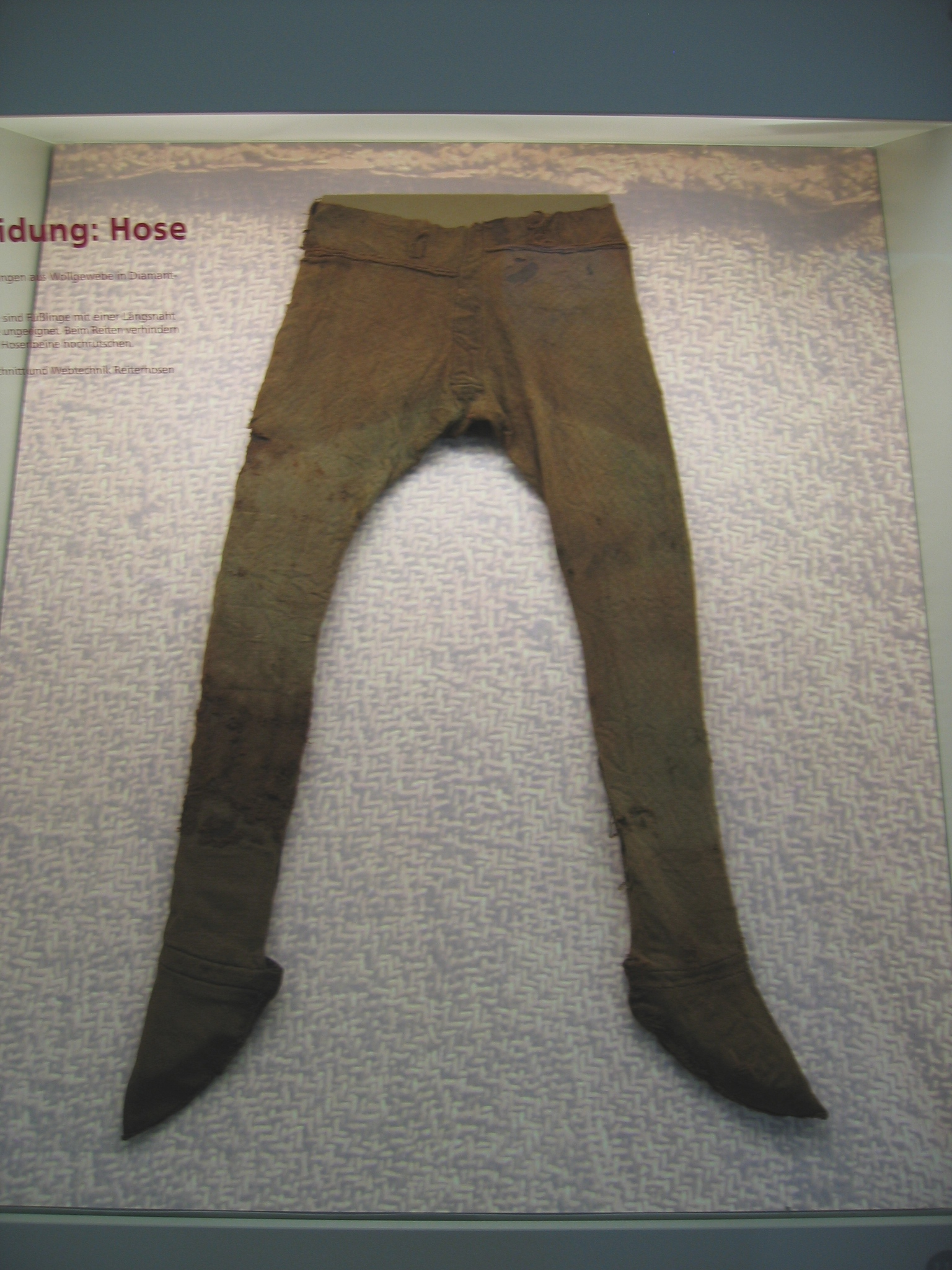
A pair of trousers with attached stockings found in the Thorsberg moor (3rd century CE)

Clothing does not generally preserve well archaeologically. Early Germanic clothing is shown on some Roman stone monuments such as Trajan's Column and the Column of Marcus Aurelius, and is occasionally discovered in finds from in moors, mostly from Scandinavia. Frequent finds include long trousers, sometimes including connected stockings, shirt-like gowns (Kittel) with long sleeves, large pieces of cloth, and capes with fur on the inside. All of these are thought to be male clothing, while finds of tubular garments are thought to be female clothing. These would have reached to the ankles and would likely have been held in place by brooches at the height of the shoulders, as shown on Roman monuments. On Roman depictions, the dress was gathered below the breast or at the waist, and there are frequently no sleeves. Sometimes a blouse or skirt is depicted below the dress, along with a neckerchief around the throat. By the middle of the 5th century CE, both men and women among the continental Germanic peoples came to wear a Roman-style tunic as their most important piece of clothing. This was secured at the waist and likely adopted due to intensive contact with the Roman world. The Romans typically depict Germanic men and women as bareheaded, although some head-coverings have been found. Although Tacitus mentions an undergarment made of linen, no examples of these have been found.

Surviving examples indicate that Germanic textiles were of high quality and mostly made of flax and wool. Roman depictions show the Germani wearing materials that were only lightly worked. Surviving examples indicate that a variety of weaving techniques were used. Leather was used for shoes, belts, and other gear. Spindles, sometimes made of glass or amber, and the weights from looms and distaffs are frequently found in Germanic settlements.

=== Trade ===
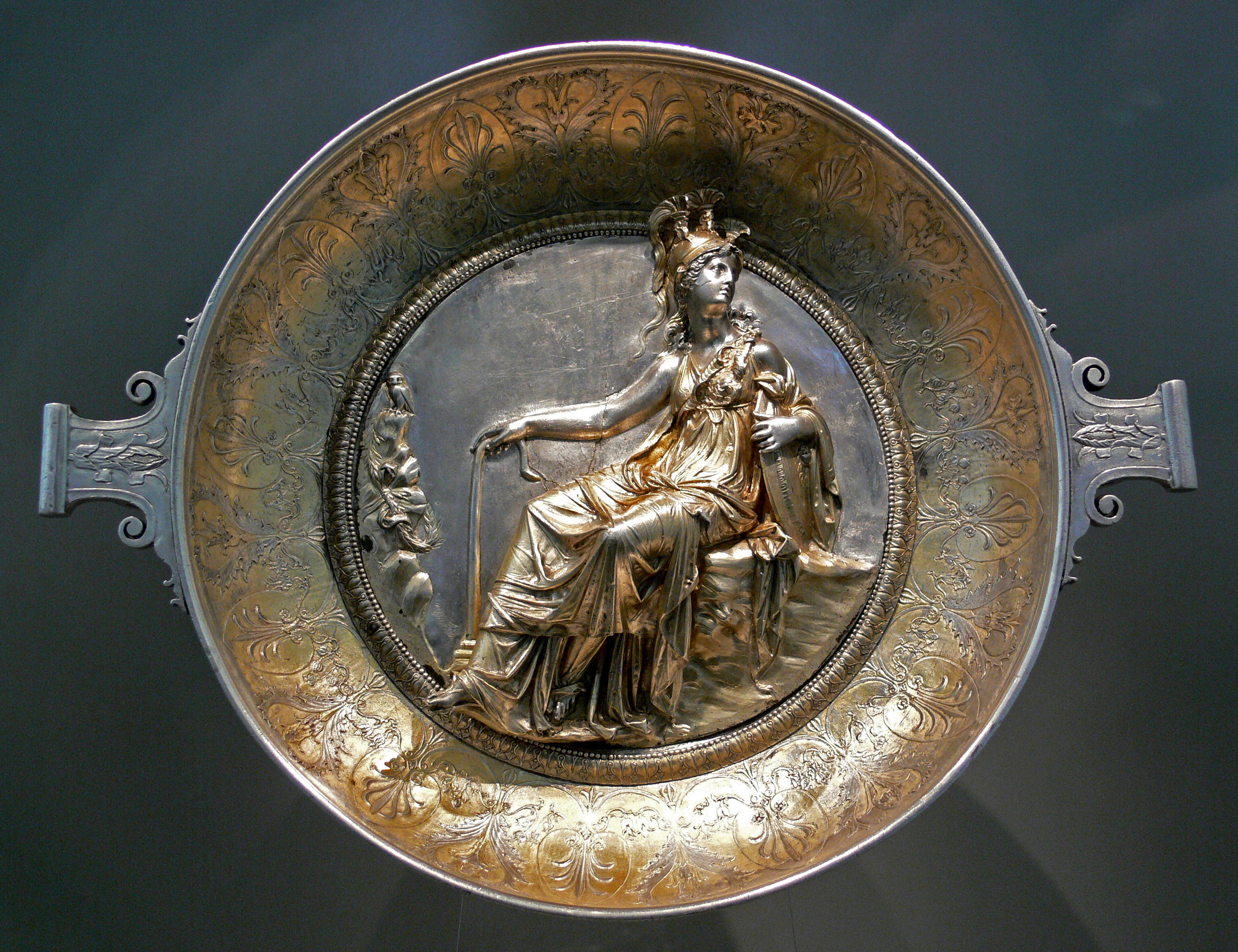
The Minerva Bowl, part of the Hildesheim Treasure, likely a Roman diplomatic gift. The treasure may date from the reign of Nero (37–68 CE) or the early Flavian dynasty (69–96 CE).

Archaeology shows that from at least the turn of the 3rd century CE larger regional settlements in Germania existed that were not exclusively involved in an agrarian economy, and that the main settlements were connected by paved roads. The entirety of Germania was within a system of long-distance trade. Migration-period seaborne trade is suggested by Gudme on the Danish island of Funen and other harbors on the Baltic.

Roman trade with Germania is poorly documented. Roman merchants crossing the Alps for Germania are recorded already by Caesar in the 1st century BCE. During the imperial period, most trade probably took place in trading posts in Germania or at major Roman bases. The most well-known Germanic export to the Roman Empire was amber, with a trade centered on the Baltic coast. Economically, however, amber is likely to have been fairly unimportant. The use of Germanic loanwords in surviving Latin texts suggests that besides amber (glaesum), the Romans also imported the feathers of Germanic geese (ganta) and hair dye (sapo). Germanic slaves were also a major commodity. Archaeological discoveries indicate that lead was exported from Germania as well, perhaps mined in Roman-Germanic "joint ventures".

Products imported from Rome are found archaeologically throughout the Germanic sphere and include vessels of bronze and silver, glassware, pottery, brooches; other products such as textiles and foodstuffs may have been just as important. Rather than mine and smelt non-ferrous metals themselves, Germanic smiths seem to have often preferred to melt down finished metal objects from Rome, which were imported in large numbers, including coins, metal vessels, and metal statues. Tacitus mentions in Germania chapter 23 that the Germani living along the Rhine bought wine, and Roman wine has been found in Denmark and northern Poland. Finds of Roman silver coinage and weapons might have been war booty or the result of trade, while high quality silver items may have been diplomatic gifts. Roman coinage may have acted as a form of currency as well.

== Genetics ==
The use of genetic studies to investigate the Germanic past is controversial, with scholars such as Guy Halsall suggesting it could represent a hearkening back to 19th-century ideas of race. Sebastian Brather, Wilhelm Heizmann, and Steffen Patzold write that genetics studies are of great use for demographic history, but cannot give us any information about cultural history. In a 2013 book which reviewed studies made up until then, it was noted that studies have associated several Y-DNA haplogroups with Germanic-speaking populations including haplogroup I1, R1a1a, R1b-P312 and R1b-U106.

== Modern reception ==
The rediscovery of Tacitus's Germania in the 1450s was used by German humanists to claim a glorious classical past for their nation that could compete with that of Greece and Rome, and to equate the "Germanic" with the "German". While the humanists' notion of the "Germanic" was initially vague, later it was narrowed and used to support a notion of German(ic) superiority to other nations. Equally important was Jordanes's Getica, rediscovered by Aeneas Sylvius Piccolomini in the mid-15th century and first printed in 1515 by Konrad Peutinger, which depicted Scandinavia as the "womb of nations" (Latin: vagina nationum) from which all the historical northeastern European barbarians migrated in the distant past. While treated with suspicion by German scholars, who preferred the indigenous origin given by Tacitus, this motif became very popular in contemporary Swedish Gothicism, as it supported Sweden's imperial ambitions. Peutinger printed the Getica together with Paul the Deacon's History of the Lombards, so that the Germania, the Getica, and the History of the Lombards formed the basis for the study of the Germanic past. Scholars did not clearly differentiate between the Germanic peoples, Celtic peoples, and the "Scythian peoples" until the late 18th century with the discovery of Indo-European and the establishment of language as the primary criterion for nationality. Before that time, German scholars considered the Celtic peoples to be part of the Germanic group.

The beginning of Germanic philology proper starts around the turn of the 19th century, with Jacob and Wilhelm Grimm being the two most significant founding figures. Their oeuvre included various monumental works on linguistics, culture, and literature. Jacob Grimm offered many arguments identifying the Germans as the "most Germanic" of the Germanic-speaking peoples, many of which were taken up later by others who sought to equate "Germanicness" (German: Germanentum) with "Germanness" (German: Deutschtum). Grimm also argued that the Scandinavian sources were, while much later, more "pure" attestations of "Germanness" than those from the south, an opinion that remains common today. German nationalist thinkers of the völkisch movement placed a great emphasis on the connection of modern Germans to the Germania using Tacitus to prove the purity and virtue of the German people, which had allowed them to conquer the decadent Romans. German historians used the Germanic past to argue for a liberal, democratic form of government and a unified German state. Contemporary Romantic nationalism in Scandinavia placed more weight on the Viking Age, resulting in the movement known as Scandinavism.

In the late 19th century, Gustaf Kossinna developed several widely accepted theories tying archaeological finds of specific assemblages of objects. Kossina used his theories to extend Germanic identity back to the Neolithic period and to state with confidence when and where various Germanic and other peoples had migrated within Europe. In the 1930s and 40s, the Nazi Party made use of notions of Germanic "purity" reaching back into the earliest prehistoric times. Nazi ideologues also used the "Germanic" nature of peoples such as the Franks and Goths to justify territorial annexations in northern France, Ukraine, and the Crimea. Scholars reinterpreted Germanic culture to justify the Nazis' rule as anchored in the Germanic past, emphasizing noble leaders and warlike retinues who dominated surrounding peoples. After 1945, these associations led to a scholarly backlash and re-examining of Germanic origins. Many medieval specialists have even argued that scholars should avoid the term Germanic altogether since it is too emotionally charged, adding that it has been politically abused and creates more confusion than clarity.

== See also ==
- List of early Germanic peoples
