= Gothic name =

The onomastics of the Gothic language (Gothic personal names) are an important source not only for the history of the Goths themselves, but for Germanic onomastics in general and the linguistic and cultural history of the Germanic Heroic Age of c. the 3rd to 6th centuries. Gothic names can be found in Roman records as far back as the 4th century AD. After the Muslim invasion of Hispania and the fall of the Visigothic kingdom in the early 8th century, the Gothic tradition was largely interrupted, although Gothic or pseudo-Gothic names continued to be given in the Kingdom of Asturias in the 9th and 10th centuries.

(Not to be confused with names inspired by the modern-day Goth subculture.)

== History ==
The names of the Goths themselves have been traced to their 3rd century settlement in Scythia. The names Tervingi and Greuthungi have been interpreted as meaning "forest-dwellers" and "steppe-dwellers", respectively. Later on, the terms Ostrogothi and Visigothi have also been understood to mean "Eastern Goths" and "Western Goths", although all four etymologies are not without detractors.

Jordanes gives partly mythological genealogies leading up to historical 4th to 5th century rulers:

- Amali dynasty: Gapt, Hulmu, Augis, Amal, Athal, Achiulf, Oduulf, Ansila, Ediulf, Vultuulf, Ermanaric
- Vultuulf, Valaravans, Vinithariust Vandalarius, Theodemir, Valamir, Vidimer.

Another important source of early Gothic names are the accounts (hagiography) surrounding the persecution of Gothic Christians in the second half of the 4th century. Many of the Gothic saints mentioned in these sources bear resemblance to Syrian, Cappadocian and Phrygian names, following in the baptismal tradition of that time.

Even though the Muslim invasion of Hispania (715 AD) and subsequent fall of the Visigothic kingdom in the early 8th century caused most Gothic naming traditions to be lost, a type of Gothic or pseudo-Gothic naming tradition continued in the Kingdom of Asturias, which by that time had become the central driving force behind the Christian reconquest of Andalusia. Thus, Alfonso I of Asturias was originally given the Gothic name *Adafuns or Adalfuns, becoming one of the most popular names in the medieval Iberian kingdoms.

In France, where remnants of the old Visigothic Kingdom still remained (Gothic March), Gothic names continued to be common up until the 12th century.

== List of names ==
Gothic names of the 4th to 6th centuries include:

Recorded Name	Gothic Form (reconstructed forms indicated by *)	Etymology	Lifetime	Identity/Source
Ariaricus			fl. 330s	Balthi Therving king
Aoricus			fl. 340s	Therving king
At(h)alaricus	*Aþalareiks	aþal(a) "noble" + reiks "ruler"	d. 534	King of the Ostrogoths
Athanaricus	*Aþanareiks	aþni "year" + reiks "ruler"	fl. 369, d. 381	Therving king
Ermanaricus	*Airmanareiks	Ermana "all men" + reiks "ruler"	cf. Arminius, Herman, Manrique	Amali king of the Greuthungi
Odotheus/Alatheus	*Audaþius or *Alaþius	auda- "wealth", or ala- "all"(?) plus þius "servant"	fl. 380s	King of the Greuthungi
Alaricus	*Alareiks	ala "all"(?) + reiks	fl. 395–410	Visigothic king
Fritigernus	*Friþugairns	friþus "peace" + gairns "desiring"	fl. 370s	Therving leader
Friþareikeis	*Friþareiks	friþa "peace" + reiks "ruler" (i.e. Frederick)	d. 370s	Martyr
Wingourichos, Jungericus	*Wingureiks		fl. 370s	Therving official
Gainas			fl. 390s	Gothic Magister militum
Geberic			fl. 4th century	Gothic king
Sigericus		sigu "victory" + reiks "ruler"	d. 415	Amali king of the Visigoths
Nanduin			fl. 500s	Gothic saio
Nidada			fl. 3rd or 4th century	Gothic leader, ancestor of Geberic
At(h)aulphus	*Aþaulf or *Ataulf	aþa(l) "noble" or ata "father" + ulf "wolf"	r. 410–415	Balthi king of the Visigoths
Theodericus	*Þiudareiks	þiuda "people" + reiks "ruler" (see Theodoric)	r. 418–451	Balthi king of the Visigoths
Triwila			fl. 520s	Saio of Theodoric and praepositus cubiculi
Ragnaris	*Raginariþ	ragina (cf. Vandalic Raginari ) and riþ, both meaning "counsel"	d. 555	A Hunnic leader allied with the Ostrogoths
Sunifredus	𐍃𐌿𐌽𐌾𐌰𐌹𐍆𐍂𐌹𐌸𐌰𐍃 sunjaifriþas		c. 550 (Naples Deed) c. 700 (Visigothic Nobleman)	Visigothic Nobleman
Wulfila	*Wulfila	wulfs "wolf" + -ila (diminutive suffix)	c. 311-383	Bishop

== See also ==
- Name of the Goths
- List of Visigothic queens
- Amali dynasty
- Balthi dynasty
