= Ring of Pietroassa =

Roman-era necklace found in Romania

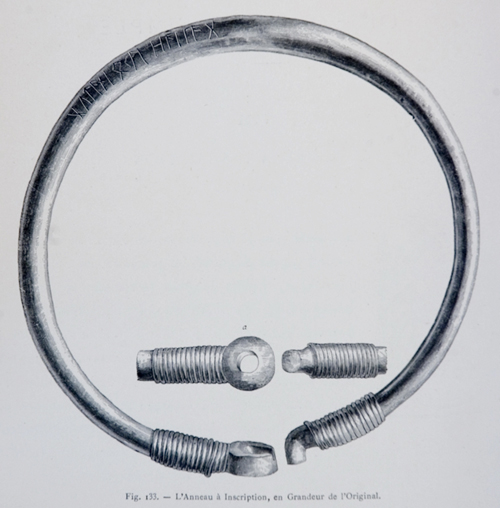
The ring of Pietroassa (drawing by Henri Trenk, 1875).

The Ring of Pietroassa or Buzău torc is a gold torc-like necklace found in a ring barrow in Pietroassa (now Pietroasele), Buzău County, southern Romania (formerly Wallachia), in 1837. It formed part of a large gold hoard (the Pietroasele treasure) dated to between 250 and 400 CE. The ring itself is generally assumed to be of Roman-Mediterranean origin, and features a Gothic language inscription in the Elder Futhark runic alphabet.

The inscribed ring remains the subject of considerable academic interest, and a number of theories regarding its origin, the reason for its burial and its date have been proposed. The inscription, which sustained irreparable damage shortly after its discovery, can no longer be read with certainty, and has been subjected to various attempts at reconstruction and interpretation. Recently, however, it has become possible to reconstruct the damaged portion with the aid of rediscovered depictions of the ring in its original state. Taken as a whole, the inscribed ring may offer insight into the nature of the pre-Christian pagan religion of the Goths.

== History ==
=== Origin ===
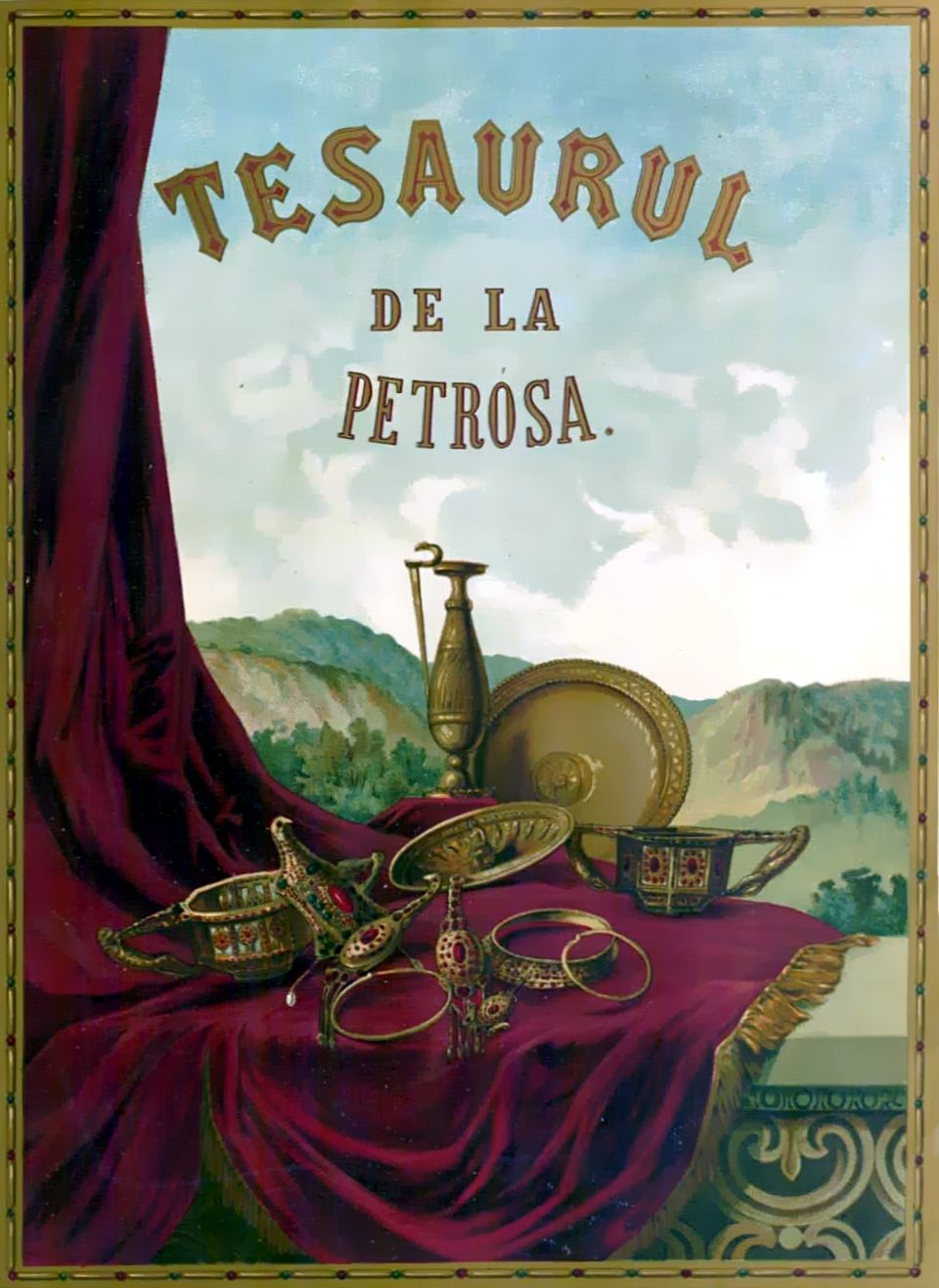
A poster depicting the Pietroassa treasure, of which the inscribed ring is a part

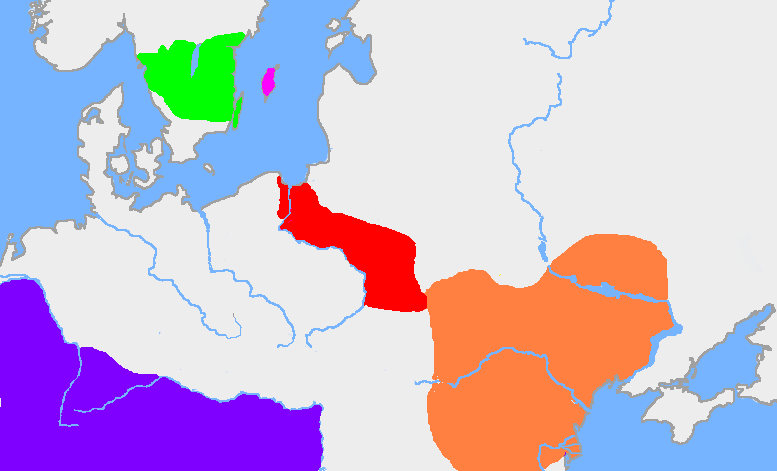
Wielbark Culture, early 3rd century Chernyakhov culture, early 4th century Roman Empire

The original hoard, discovered within a large ring barrow known as Istriţa Hill near Pietroasele, Romania, consisted of 22 pieces, comprising a wide assortment of gold vessels, plates and cups as well as jewellery, including two rings with inscriptions. When first uncovered, the objects were found stuck together by an unidentifiable black mass, leading to the assumption that the hoard might have been covered in some kind of organic material (e.g. cloth or leather) prior to being interred. The total weight of the find was approximately 20 kg (44 lb.).

Ten objects, among them one of the inscribed rings, were stolen shortly after the find was made, and when the remaining objects were recovered, it was discovered that the other ring had been cut into at least four pieces by a Bucharest goldsmith, whereby one of the inscribed characters had become damaged to the point of illegibility. Fortunately, detailed drawings, a cast, and a photograph made by London's Arundel Society of the ring before it was damaged survive, and the nature of the lost character can be established with relative certainty.

The remaining objects in the collection display a high quality of craftsmanship such that scholars doubt an indigenous origin. Taylor (1879), in one of the earliest works discussing the find, speculates that the objects could represent a part of the plunder acquired by Goths in the raids made on the Roman provinces of Moesia and Thrace (238–251). Another early theory, probably first proposed by Odobescu (1889) and picked up again by Giurascu (1976), identifies Athanaric, pagan king of the Gothic Thervingi, as the likely owner of the hoard, presumably acquired through the conflict with the Roman Emperor Valens in 369. The Goldhelm catalogue (1994) suggests that the objects could also be viewed as having been gifts made by Roman leaders to allied Germanic princes.

Recent mineralogical studies performed on the objects indicate at least three geographically disparate origins for the gold ore itself: the Southern Ural Mountains, Nubia (Sudan), and Persia. An indigenous Dacian origin for the ore has been ruled out. Though Cojocaru (1999) rejects the possibility of Roman imperial coins having been melted down and used for some of the objects, Constantinescu (2003) comes to the opposite conclusion.

A comparison of mineralogical composition, smelting and forging techniques, and earlier typological analysis indicates that the gold used to make the inscribed ring, classified as Celto-Germanic, is neither as pure as that of the Graeco-Roman, nor as alloyed as that found in the Polychrome Germanic objects. These results seem to indicate that at least part of the hoard—including the inscribed ring—was composed of gold ore mined far north of Dacia, and could therefore represent objects that had been in Gothic possession prior to their southward migration (see Wielbark culture, Chernyakhov culture). While this may cast some doubt on the traditional theory regarding a Roman-Mediterranean origin for the ring, further research is necessary before the origin of the material used in its manufacture can be identified conclusively.

=== Burial ===
As with most finds of this type, it remains unclear as to why the objects were placed within the barrow, though several plausible reasons have been proposed. Taylor argues that the ring-barrow in which the objects were found was likely the site of a pagan temple, and that, based on an analysis of the surviving inscription (see below), they were part of a votive hoard indicative of a still-active paganism. Though this theory has been largely ignored, later research, notably that of Looijenga (1997), has observed that all of the remaining objects in the hoard possess a "definite ceremonial character". Particularly noteworthy in this connection is the Patera, or libation dish, which is decorated with depictions of (probably Germanic) deities.

Those in favour of viewing the objects as the personal hoard of Athanaric suggest that the gold was buried in an attempt to hide it from the Huns, who had defeated the Gothic Greuthungi north of the Black Sea and began moving down into Thervingian Dacia around 375. However, it remains unclear why the gold would have remained buried, as Athanaric's treaty with Theodosius I (380) enabled him to bring his tribesmen under the protection of Roman rule prior to his death in 381. Other researchers have suggested that the hoard was that of an Ostrogothic king, with Rusu (1984) specifically identifying Gainnas, a Gothic general in the Roman army who was killed by the Huns around 400, as the owner of the hoard. Although this would help explain why the hoard remained buried, it fails to account for the conspicuous ring-barrow having been chosen as the site to hide such a large and valuable treasure.

=== Date ===
Various dates for the burial of the hoard have been proposed, largely derived from considerations regarding the origin of the objects themselves and their manner of burial, though the inscription has also been an important factor (see below). Taylor suggests a range from 210 to 250. In more recent studies, scholars have proposed slightly later dates, with supporters of the Athanaric theory suggesting the end of the 4th century, the date also proposed by Constantinescu, and Tomescu suggesting the early 5th century.

== Inscription ==
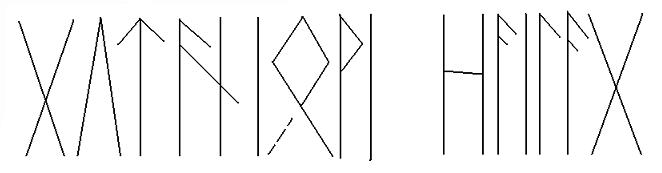
Rendition of the runic inscription from the ring of Pietroassa.

=== Reconstruction and interpretation ===
The gold ring bears an Elder Futhark runic inscription of 15 characters, with the 7th (probably ᛟ /o/) having been mostly destroyed when the ring was cut in half by thieves. The damaged rune has been the object of some scholarly debate, and is variously interpreted as indicating ᛃ /j/ (Reichert 1993, Nedoma 1993) or possibly ᛋ /s/ (Looijenga 1997). If the photograph of the Arundel Society is to be taken as a guide, then the inscription originally read as follows:

gutaniowi hailag
ᚷᚢᛏᚨᚾᛁᛟᚹᛁ ᚺᚨᛁᛚᚨᚷ

This reading was followed by early scholars, notably Taylor, who translates "dedicated to the temple of the Goths", and Diculescu (1923), who translates "sacred (hailag) to the Jove (iowī, i.e. Thor) of the Goths". Düwel (2001), commenting upon the same reading, suggests interpreting ᛟ as indicative of ō[þal] thus:

gutanī ō[þal] wī[h] hailag

This, following Krause (1966), translates as "sacred (and) inviolable inheritance of the Goths". Other scholars have interpreted the ᛟ as indicative of a feminine ending: Johnsen (1971) translates "the holy relic (= the [altar] ring) of Gutaniō"; Krogmann (1978), reading ᛗ /m/ for ᚹᛁ /wi/, translates "dedicated to the Gothic Mothers (= female guardian spirits of the Goths)"; Antonsen (2002) translates "Sacrosanct of Gothic women/female warriors". Construing the damaged rune as ᛋ /s/, Looijenga (1997) reads:

gutanīs wī[h] hailag

She comments that gutanīs should be understood as an early form of Gothic gutaneis, "Gothic", and wī[h] as early Gothic weih, "sanctuary". Following this reading, she translates the whole inscription "Gothic (object). Sacrosanct." Reichert (1993) suggests that it is also possible to read the damaged rune as ᛃ /j/, and interprets it as representative of j[ēra], thus:

gutanī j[era] wī[h] hailag

Reichert translates this as "(good) year of the Goths, sacred (and) inviolable hailag". Though Düwel (2001) has expressed doubts regarding the meaning of such a statement, Nordgren (2004) supports Reichert's reading, viewing the ring as connected to a sacral king in his role of ensuring an abundant harvest (represented by ᛃ jera). Pieper (2003) reads the damaged rune as ᛝ /ŋ/, thus:

gutanī [i(ng)]wi[n] hailag

He translates this "[to] Ingwin of the Goths. Holy."

=== Meaning ===
Despite the lack of consensus regarding the exact import of the inscription, scholars seem to agree that its language is some form of Gothic and that the intent behind it was religious. Taylor interprets the inscription as being clearly pagan in nature and indicative of the existence of a temple to which the ring was a votive offering. He derives his date for the burial (210 to 250) from the fact that the Christianizing of the Goths along the Danube is generally considered to have been almost complete within a few generations after their having arrived there in 238. Though paganism among the Goths did survive the initial conversion phase of 250 to 300 – as the martyring of the converted Christian Goths Wereka, Batwin (370) and Sabbas (372) at the hands of the indigenously pagan Goths (in the latter case Athanaric) shows – it was weakened considerably in the following years, and the likelihood of such a deposit being made would have been greatly diminished.

MacLeod and Mees (2006), following Mees (2004), interpret the ring as possibly representing either a "temple-ring" or a "sacred oath-ring", the existence of which in pagan times is documented in Old Norse literature and archaeological finds. Furthermore, they suggest that the inscription could be proof of the existence of "mother goddess" worship among the Goths – echoing the well-documented worship of "mother goddesses" in other parts of the Germanic North. MacLeod and Mees also propose that the appearance of both of the Common Germanic terms denoting "holiness" (wīh and hailag) may help to clarify the distinction between the two concepts in the Gothic language, implying that the ring was considered holy, not only for its being connected to one or more divinities, but also in and of itself.

== See also ==
- Almáttki áss
- Elder Futhark
- Gothic runic inscriptions
- Pietroasele Treasure
- Treasure of Osztrópataka
- Pietroasele
