= List of pagans =

This is a list of historical individuals notable for their pagan religion.

== Arabic ==
Pagans among the Arabic peoples

- Amr ibn Hishām, pagan leader
- Epiphanius of Petra, pagan sophist and rhetorician
- Theodora of Emesa, neoplatonist
- Umayyah ibn Khalaf, pagan leader
- Utbah ibn Rabi'ah, pagan leader

== Baltic ==
Historic Baltic pagans:

- Algirdas (died 1377), Lithuanian grand prince
- Kęstutis, brother of Algirdas, killed 1382, for some time held title of grand prince of Lithuania after Algirdas' death
- Nameisis (died after 1281), Semigallian duke
- Viestards (died 1230), Semigallian duke
- Vytautas the Great, grand duke of Lithuania and son of Kęstutis, baptized with his cousin Jogaila in 1386
- Jogaila, king of Poland, baptized in 1386 and renamed Władysław II Jagiełło. Together with Vytautas they are the last pagan monarchs of Europe. He gave his name to the Jagiellon branch of Gediminids – one of largest dynasties in medieval Europe.

== Celtic ==
Pagans among the ancient Celtic peoples (Roman Gaul, Roman Britain, Ireland)

Historic Celtic pagans:

- Caratacus (born c. 10 AD), chieftain of the Catuvellauni tribe which led the British resistance to the Roman Conquest
- Boudica (born c. 30 AD–60 AD) Celtic warrior queen of the Iceni tribe who fought against the Roman oppression of Britain
- Niall of the Nine Hostages (died c. 405), according to legend kidnapped St. Patrick as a youth
- Lóegaire mac Néill (fl. c. 440s), according to Muirchu moccu Machtheni a "great, fierce, pagan emperor of the barbarians reigning in Tara"
- Lughaid mac Loeguire (died c. 507)
- Diarmait mac Cerbaill (died 585), according to Irish tradition the last high king of Ireland to follow the pagan rituals of inauguration
- Gwenc'hlan, legendary as the last Breton bard and druid

== Egyptian ==
- Horapollo, 5th-century Egyptian pagan writer

== Germanic ==
Historic Germanic pagans:

- Albruna, Germanic seeress, prophetess, soothsayer
- Aoric, Gothic pagan
- Arbogast (died 394), Frankish general who tried to revive paganism in the Roman Empire
- Ariaric, Gothic pagan
- Arwald (died 686), last pagan ruler of the Isle of Wight, or any Anglo-Saxon kingdom
- Atharid, Gothic pagan
- Audofleda, pagan Gothic queen until her marriage
- Athanaric (died 381), king of several branches of the Thervings for at least two decades in the 4th century
- Björn Eriksson, king of Sweden
- Blot-Sweyn, leader of the Swedish pagan renaissance in the 11th century
- Coifi, priest of the temple at Goodmanham in the Kingdom of Northumbria in 627
- Dagalaifus, pagan of Germanic descent who served as consul in 366
- Eadbald (died 640), king of Kent
- Eanfrith (590–634), king of Bernicia from 633 to 634 who reverted to paganism after becoming king
- Ecgric (died c. 636), East Anglian king of an independent kingdom
- Emund Eriksson, Swedish king
- Eric of Good Harvests (died c. 1081), semi-historical successor to Blot-Sweyn, and the last pagan king in Scandinavia
- Erik Ringsson, Swedish king and the son of Ring
- Eric the Victorious (born c. 945 - died c. 995), Swedish monarch who became Christian but later reverted to paganism
- Fravitta, pagan chieftain of the Visigoths
- Ganna, Germanic prophetess and priestess (Seherin) of the Semnones tribe and a predecessor of Veleda
- Gandalf Alfgeirsson, legendary king of the petty kingdom Alfheim, in south-eastern Norway and south-western Sweden He is portrayed in Snorri Sturluson's saga Heimskringla.
- Gibuld (fl. c. 470), king of the Alamanni who freed hostages on the request of Saint Severinus of Noricum
- Hermeric (died 441), king of the Suevi in Galicia
- Haakon Sigurdsson (c. 937 – 995), de facto ruler of Norway from about 975 to 995 who was in favor of Norse paganism
- Palnetoke, legendary pagan foster-father of Sweyn's
- Peada of Mercia (died 656), son of Penda and a pagan until his conversion
- Penda of Mercia (died 655), one of the last pagan Anglo-Saxon rulers of England
- Radagaisus, pagan Gothic king
- Redbad, last independent ruler of Frisia
- Ragnachar, Frankish pagan petty king
- Rechila, Suevic King of Galicia from 438 until his death
- Ricberht, East Anglian king of an independent kingdom
- Ring, Swedish king
- Sæward, brother of Sexred
- Sexred (died 626?), pagan king of the East Saxons who refused to accept Christianity, openly practiced paganism and gave permission to his subjects to worship their idols
- Sigeberht the Little, king of Essex
- Sigehere (died c. 688), joint king of the Kingdom of Essex along with his cousin Sæbbi
- Sigrid the Haughty, first wife of Eric the Victorious
- Steinunn Refsdóttir was an Icelandic skald active at the end of the 10th century.
- Sweyn Forkbeard (died 1014), pagan king of Denmark
- Swithhelm, pagan king of Essex but converted to Christianity in 662
- Tytila (died c. 616), semi-historical pagan king of East Anglia
- Veleda, priestess and prophetess of the Bructeri tribe
- Waluburg, Semnonian seeress in the service of the governor of Roman Egypt
- Wehha, king of the East Angles
- Widukind (died 808), pagan Saxon leader and the chief opponent of Charlemagne during the Saxon Wars
- Wingurich, Gothic pagan
- Wuffa, king of the East Angles

== Graeco-Roman ==
Historic Graeco-Roman pagans:

- Alexander the Great, king of the ancient Greek kingdom of Macedon and conqueror of Achaemenid Persia, with his death marking the start of the Hellenistic period. Alexander became legendary as a classical hero in the mold of Achilles, featuring prominently in the historical and mythical traditions of both Greek and non-Greek cultures.
- Hadrian (76–138), completed the Temple of Olympian Zeus and was noted for strengthening ties between the Roman and Greek pantheons
- Lucian of Samosata, writer and satirist
- Decius, emperor who made efforts to increase public piety. Required sacrifices on his behalf which led to execution for those who refused, mostly non-pagans.
- Diocletian, emperor noted for his piety and pagan views. Persecuted and executed Manicheans and Christians in an effort to support the Roman state religion.
- Galerius, emperor who strongly supported Roman paganism. Thought to have been the primary driver behind the Diocletian persecutions of Manicheans and Christians in defense of Roman religion.
- Porphyry, neoplatonist philosopher who argued strongly in favor of Roman paganism and opposed the rise of Christianity. Also wrote many treatises on Roman paganism and is attributed as the author of many more that are of more uncertain origin.
- Iamblichus of Chalcis, disciple of Porphyry
- Ammianus Marcellinus, 4th-century historian
- Maurus Servius Honoratus, 4th-century grammarian
- Julian (ruled 361–363), attempted to re-establish Roman paganism, initiating a "pagan revival" among a number of families of the Roman elite
- Alypius of Antioch
- Vettius Agorius Praetextatus (died 384)
- Virius Nicomachus Flavianus (334–394)
- Quintus Aurelius Symmachus (c. 340 – c. 402), Roman senator who attempted to have the altar of Altar of Victory restored
- Hypatia of Alexandria, neoplatonist philosopher, mathematician and astronomer, killed in 415 by a Christian mob
- Nicomachus Flavianus (died after 432)
- Eunapius, last hierophant of Eleusis
- Martianus Capella, 5th-century author
- Proclus (died 485), neoplatonist philosopher
- Zosimus, 5th-century Byzantine historian
- Damascius (c. 480 – died after 533), "the last of the neoplatonists"
- Gemistus Pletho, 15th-century Byzantine philosopher
- Salutius, 4th-century author of the treatise On the Gods and the Cosmos for Hellenic paganism
- Rutilius Claudius Namatianus (died after 416), Roman imperial poet

== Turko-Mongolic ==
- Attila
- Bayan I
- Asparuh
- Krum
- Genghis Khan
- Abaqa Khan

== Hungarian ==
- Árpád
- Géza
- Koppány
- Vata

== See also ==
- List of druids and neo-druids
- List of modern pagans
- List of neopagan movements
- Lists of people by belief
