= Nicetas the Goth =

Christian martyr and saint

Saint Nicetas the Goth
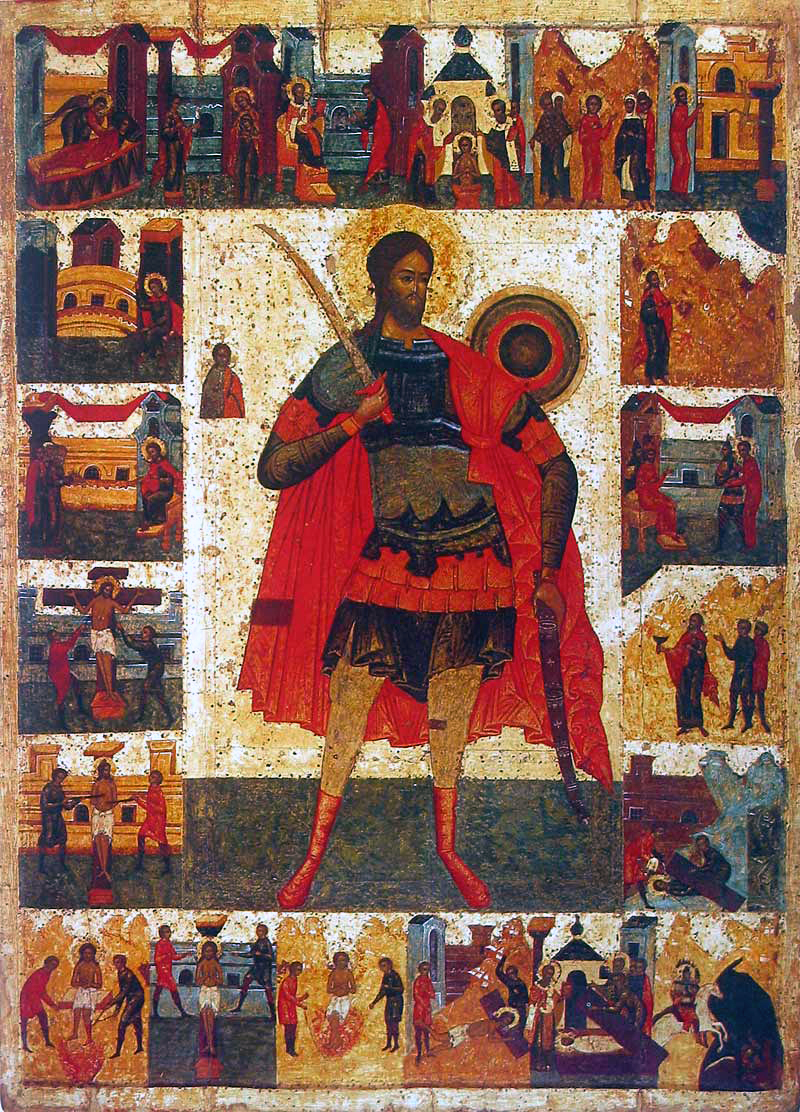

Martyr
- Venerated in: Catholic Church; Eastern Orthodox Church
- Feast: September 15

Nicetas (Greek: Nικήτας) is a Christian martyr of the 4th century, venerated particularly in the Eastern Orthodox Church. His feastday is 15 September. Nicetas was of Gothic origin, living during the 4th century AD. His life spanned the years of Emperor Constantine the Great's sole rule (324–337 AD). He belonged to the upper social class of his people. Nicetas was instructed in Christianity by Theophilus of Gothia, a converted bishop.

His martyrdom occurred during the persecution initiated by Athanaric, a judge (iudex) of the Visigothic tribes, after 374 AD. The persecution was fueled by the rejection of the native pagan religion and the adoption of the Roman Emperor's religion, which was Christianity, then considered the religion of the enemy. Nicetas' story highlights the tensions between pagan and Christian beliefs during this era and his sacrifice underlines the spread of Christianity among Gothic tribes.

== Life ==
Nicetas, a Gothic soldier, lived in the Danube region at the margins of the Byzantine Empire. Presumably, he received his Greek name on the occasion of his baptism by the Gothic bishop Theophilus, a participant in the First Ecumenical Council. Pagan Goths began to oppose the spread of Christianity, which resulted in internecine strife. Nicetas fought in the Gothic civil war between the pagan Athanaric and the Christian Fritigern. After the defeat of Athanaric and after the invention of Gothic alphabets by Ulfilas, Nicetas worked intensely among the Goths.

After a few years, Athanarichus returned, defeated Fritigern, and resumed his persecution of Christians. Nicetas was condemned to the stake in 372. According to his Passio, the devil, shaped as an angel, induced Nicetas to sacrifice to the pagan gods for saving his life; Nicetas, however, put him to flight by means of prayer and assisted by archangel Michael.

His friend Marianus took his body to Mopsuestia in Cilicia, and built a church dedicated to Nicetas. His body was buried there, and later transferred to Constantinople.

Part of his relics were later given to the monastery of Vysokie Dechani in Serbia. In Greece, Russia, Ukraine, Serbia, Macedonia and Cyprus there are several churches and monasteries named after St Nicetas. See Church of Saint Nicetas.

The veneration of this saint in the medieval period gave rise to the Slavic forms of his name: Nikita, Mykyta and Mikita. St Nicetas is prayed to for the preservation of children from birth defects.

== See also ==
- Gothic persecution of Christians
- Sabbas the Goth
