= Kindins =

Kindins is a Gothic word (attested only in the Gothic Bible, translating Greek ἡγεμών) that is identified by some scholars as the vernacular title for what may have been a political or judicial position among the 4th century Goths, identified in Greek and Latin sources as a "judge" (iudex, δικαστής). Patrick J. Geary described the position as a "super-royal judge".

Herwig Wolfram suggested that the term also equated with the Burgundian hendinos and carried the meaning "representative of the kindred". Peter Heather considered the word þiudans could have also meant the same designation. Heather also noted that the title of this type of judge passed from father to son through Ariaric, Aoric and Athanaric. Wolfram described the office of kindins as "the judge who, elected for the duration of a specific threat and limited in his authority to the territory of the tribal confederation, exercised special monarchical power." He noted the root of the word kind meant "race" or "lineage" and how the passage of history transformed the word kindins from its original meaning of "clan chief". Knut Helle referred to the position of kindins as a "war leader" that would be appointed upon a council of several reiks during special conditions in times of crisis or war.

Wolfram considered Ariaric likely to have been the first reliably and independently recorded Thervingian kindins.

== See also ==
- Germanic king
