= Atharid =

Thervingian Kunja

Atharid (flourished in 4th century AD) was a Gothic tribal chief under the Thervingian leader Athanaric. He was the son of Athanaric's sub-king Rothesteus, and played a leading role in the killing of the Christian saint Sabbas the Goth.

== See also ==
- Gothic persecution of Christians
