= Gothic paganism =

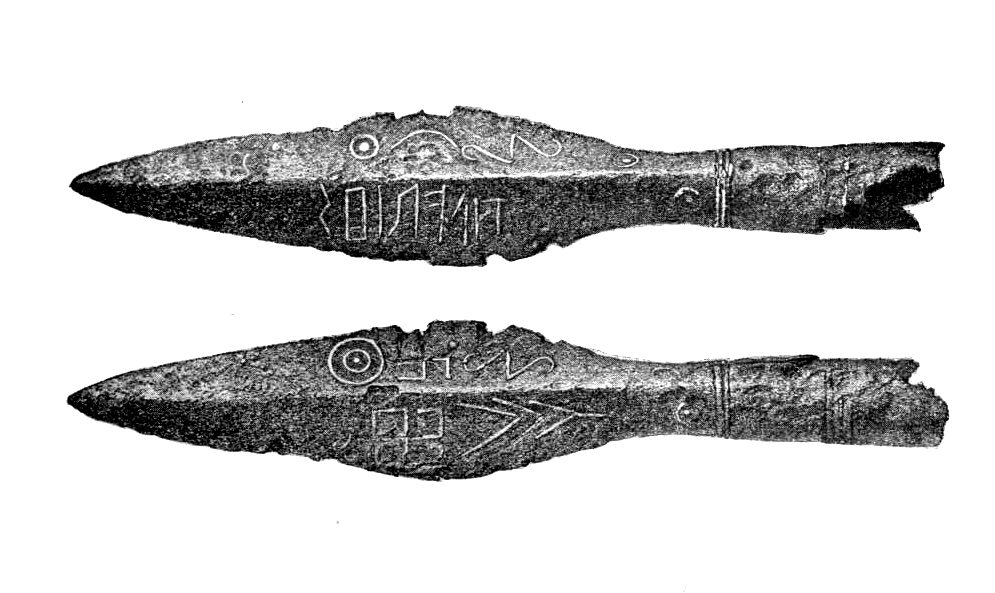
The Spearhead of Kovel (early 3rd century)

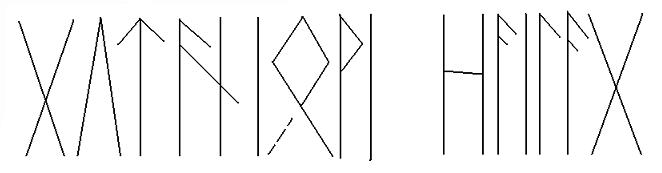
A drawing of the Elder Futhark inscription from the Ring of Pietroassa (3rd or 4th century), read as ᚷᚢᛏᚨᚾᛁᛟᚹᛁ ᚺᚨᛁᛚᚨᚷ (gutani[o]wi hailag). The seventh letter, here substituted as ᛟ (o), was destroyed when the ring was cut in half by thieves in 1875. The reading of the damaged part is disputed, but it is clear that the inscription begins with the name of the Goths (Gutani) and ends with the word for "holy, sacred" (hailag).

Gothic paganism or Gothic polytheism was the original religion of the Goths before their conversion to Christianity.

== History ==
The Goths first appear in historical records in the early 3rd century and were Christianised in the 4th and the 5th centuries. Information on the form of Germanic paganism practiced by the Goths before Christianisation is thus limited to a comparatively narrow and sparsely documented time window in the 3rd and the 4th centuries.

The centre of the Gothic cult was the village or clan (Kuni) and the ritual sacrificial meal held by the villagers under the leadership of the reiks. The reiks saw themselves as the guardians of ethnic tradition. That was expressed starkly in the Gothic persecution of Christians in the 370s in which the reiks Athanaric saw his privilege threatened by the new religion. He responded by the persecution of converted Goths but not of Christian foreigners. According to the Passio of Sabas the Goth, Sabas was executed for professing Christianity or rather for refusing to sacrifice to the tribal gods, and his companion, the priest Sansalas, was let go because he was a foreigner.

After the Goths had settled in Scythia in the 2nd century, it is probable that a process of ethnogenesis was set in motion, and that most of the "Goths" of the 3rd and the 4th centuries were not in fact descended from Scandinavia but, much as was the case with the "Huns" in the following century, consisted of a heterogeneous population, which was united under the name of "Goths" by virtue of having submitted to the elite that was formed by the ruling dynasties of the reiks.

Gothic religion was purely tribal in which polytheism, nature worship, and ancestor worship were one and the same. It is known that the Amali dynasty deified their ancestors, the Ansis (cognate with Old English ēse, Old Norse æsir), and that the Tervingi opened battle with songs of praise for their ancestors.

The gradual Christianisation of parts of the Gothic population came to a turning point in the 370s. A civil strife between the Christian reiks Fritigern and the pagan reiks Athanaric prompted Roman military intervention on the side of the Christians, which led to the Gothic War (376–382). In 376, the Romans allowed a number of ostensibly-Christian Goths, including bishops and priests, to cross the Danube and to be granted asylum.

== Religious practices ==
The English word god itself is cognate with the Gothic word guþ for a pagan idol, presumably a wooden statue of the kind paraded by Winguric on a chariot when he challenged the Gothic Christians to worship the tribal gods. It became the word for the Christian God in the Gothic Bible with its grammatical gender changed from neuter to masculine only in the new sense.

The name of the Goths themselves is presumably related and means "those who libate", and guþ "idol" is the object of the act of libation.

The words for "to sacrifice" and for "sacrificer" were blotan and blostreis, which were used in Biblical Gothic in the sense of "Christian worship" and "Christian priest".

One peculiarity that separates Gothic religion from all other forms of early Germanic religion is the absence of weapons as grave goods. Pagan warrior graves in Scandinavia, England and Germany almost invariably contained weapons until the practice was discontinued by Christianisation, but the pagan Goths do not seem to have felt the need to bury their dead with weapons. That may have arisen from the fact that weapon burials began to become prominent among pagan peoples in the 5th and the 6th centuries, possibly as a method of permanently establishing prestige upon certain families by burial ritual in a period of a heightened economy and increased intergroup competition, thus well after the Goths' Christianisation.

A Gothic belief in witches is attested with the story of the haliurun(n)ae (compare Anglo-Saxon hellrúne), who were expelled from the tribe by King Filimer and later mated with evil spirits and gave birth to the Huns, who eventually destroyed the Gothic Empire. Wolfram compares the rejection of necromancy or witchcraft by the Goths to the pagan Scandinavian rejection of the seiðr of Finnic sorcerers or shamans.

== Gothic deities ==
Very little can be said with certainty regarding the individual gods worshipped among the Goths.

In the light of comparative evidence from later forms of Germanic paganism, it seems likely that the "Germanic trinity" of Wodanaz, Tīwaz, and Þunraz may have had a parallel among the Goths, with the names Gaut, Teiws, and Fairguneis.

=== War god *Teiws ===
The Goths had a cult of a god of war, identified by the Romans with Mars, presumably cognate to the Proto-Germanic Tīwaz, perhaps called *Teiws in Gothic, on the basis on the corresponding letter names.

Among the Tervingi, perhaps also known as the Terwing, the tribe's mythical, eponymous ancestor, possibly related also to the Týrfingr lost sword legend, 'the finger' of the god Týr, which on touch caused sudden death to its enemies.

=== Ancestor Gapt vs. Norse Odin ===
There was also Gaut or Gapt, the ancestor of the Amali dynasty and presumably eponymous of the entire people of the "Goths". It is unclear whether this deity should be considered independent of those that were just mentioned or if it is only another name by which either of them was also known.

Old Norse Gautr in later centuries served as another name for Odin in Scandinavia. It may also be significant that in the Prose Edda, Odin himself is said to have come to the north from the Black Sea region, referred to as Turkland, the lands that some believe were formerly and later inhabited by some ancestors of the Goths. If Gapt was the original "ansic" ancestor, who was later identified with Odin, the Gothic letter name *ansuz (aza) may testify to his importance, but that does not imply that Gaut can be assumed to have had the same attributes typical of Odin in the Viking Age. These may be echoes that hark back to an older influence from many centuries earlier in which it is visible in the archaeological records the introduction of steppes elements from the Yamna Culture among the earliest Germanic cultural horizon, which giving birth to the Corded Ware Culture from the Copper Age.

=== *Fairguneis, Ingwaz, and *Donaws ===
Another important god may have been called *Fairguneis, identified by the Romans as Jupiter and presumed by modern scholars to be Thor, but that relies on the accuracy of the Romans' interpretation of Gothic religion.

The Gothic letter enguz may indicate the existence among the Goths of the god Ingwaz, an older name for the god Freyr, but there is no other evidence for this theory.

Finally, the Danube River may have also been deified as *Donaws.

== See also ==
- Gaut
- Germanic paganism
- Gothic Christianity
- Gothic runic inscriptions
- Ring of Pietroassa

== Sources ==
- Wolfram, Herwig (1990). "Cult and Religion among the Goths". History of the Goths. Translated by Dunlap, Thomas J. University of California Press. pp. 106–112. ISBN 0520069838.
