= Muderic =

Muderic or Munderichus was a Thervingian Gothic warrior and Roman general. He was a member of the nobility of the Thervingi. In the late 370s, along with Lagarimanus, Muderic fought as a general under Athanaric against the invading Huns. Muderic later joined the Roman army, rising to the rank of Dux of Arabia.

== See also ==
- Vadomarius

== Sources ==
- Ammianus Marcellinus. Roman History.584.5
