= Riecke =

Riecke is a German language surname. Such as the related Rieck, Riek and Rieg it belongs to the group of family names derived from given names – in this case either from the name Rüdiger (English renditions: Ruediger, Rudiger, Roger) or from several compound names of Germanic origin with the element rik(e) (e. g. Richard, Dietrich, Heinrich, Friedrich) – and may refer to:

- Addison Riecke (born 2004), American child actress
- Eduard Riecke (1845–1915), German experimental physicist
- Erhard Riecke (1869–1939), German dermatologist and venereologist
- Hans-Joachim Riecke (1899–1986), German Nazi politician
- Louis Riecke, American weightlifter
