= Winguric =

Winguric or Wingurich (fl. 4th century AD), also known as Wingureiks, Wingourichos, also Jungeric was a Gothic ruler (reiks) under the Thervingian chieftain Athanaric who played a prominent role in the Gothic persecution of Christians. Around 375 he burned twenty-six Gothic Christians to death in the Crimea, who were later sanctified as martyrs by the Christian church.

Winguric is identified by name in the Menologion of Basil II and the Synaxarion of Constantinople. He was one of the unnamed "envoys" of Athanaric mentioned by Sozomen.
