= Rieck =

Rieck is a German language surname. Such as the related Riecke, Riek and Rieg it belongs to the group of family names derived from given names – in this case either from the name Rüdiger (English renditions: Ruediger, Rudiger, Roger) or from several compound names of Germanic origin with the element rik(e) (e. g. Richard, Dietrich, Heinrich, Friedrich) – and may refer to:

- Alfred Rieck (1914–2000), German rower
- Arnold Rieck (1876–1924), German stage and film actor
- Gilbert De Rieck (born 1936), former Belgian cyclist
- Hermann Rieck (c. 1837-1921), German-born pioneer farmer in Australia
- Matthew Rieck (born 1980), Australian rugby league footballer
- Mieken Rieck (1892–1977), German tennis player
