= Aoric =

King of the Thervingi

Aoric (Latinized Aoricus) was a Thervingian Gothic king (reiks and kindins) who lived in the 4th century. Aoric was son of Ariaric and father of Athanaric, he was raised in Constantinople, where a statue was erected in his honour. He was recorded by Auxentius of Durostorum leading a persecution of Gothic Christians in 347/348. Herwig Wolfram noted that "alliteration, variation, and rhythm in the line of names Athanaric, Aoric, Ariaric resemble the 'ideal type' of Hadubrand, Hildebrand, Heribrand". He considered the similarities and comparison suggested that all three kings were members of the Balti dynasty.
