= Rothesteus =

Rothesteus (flourished in 4th century), also known as Rothesteos, Rothestes, also Radistis was a Gothic sub-king under the Thervingian chieftain Athanaric. He was the father of Atharid, who played a leading role in the killing of the Christian martyr Sabbas.
