= Reik (surname) =

Reik is a surname. Notable people with the surname include:

- Haviva Reik (1914–1944), Jewish resistance fighter in World War II
- Theodor Reik (1888–1969), Austrian psychoanalyst
- Wolf Reik (born 1957), German molecular biologist

== See also ==
- Reck
- Reiks
- Riek
