= Ariaric =

4th-century Gothic ruler

Ariaric also known as Ariacus was a 4th-century Thervingian Gothic pagan ruler (reiks, kindins) He was succeeded by Geberic. In 328, Constantine the Great constructed a bridge across the Danube and built fortifications in the territory of Oltenia and Wallachia. This caused a migration of the Thervingi and Taifali to the west into Tisza Sarmatian controlled areas. The Sarmatians joined forces with Constantine, who appointed his son Constantine II to campaign against the Goths in late winter 332, reportedly resulting in the deaths of approximately one hundred thousand people due to the weather and lack of food. Ariaric was forced to sign a treaty or foedus with Constantine in 332. Yet some scholars dispute that this treaty was a foedus, but more like an act of submission.

Ariaric's son Aoric was raised in Constantinople, where a statue was erected in his memory. Patrick J. Geary suggested that under Ariaric branches of the western Goths became increasingly integrated into the Roman Empire and systems, providing troops for military campaigns against the Sassanid Empire.
