= Theophilus (bishop of the Goths) =

Theophilus Bishop of Gothia
- In office: 4th century
- Successor: Ulfilas

Personal details
- Denomination: Gothic Christianity

Theophilus was a Gothic bishop who attended the First Council of Nicaea in 325 CE and was among those who signed the Nicene Creed. His name is also sometimes spelled Theophilas, such as Theophilas Gothiae, or Theophilos.

Although the original documents of the council have not survived, several versions of the list of bishops at Nicaea have been preserved. British Library owns a 6th-century manuscript of Antiochene Synodicon (BL Add. 14528, ff. 1r–151v), collection of Syriac translations of records from several councils, including a list of 220 Nicaean bishops, among them "Theophilus of Gothia". Another gothic bishop that attended the council was Cadmus of Bosporus, from the Crimea. The bishops of Gothia were likely under the bishop of Constantinople's jurisdiction.

Theophilus ministered to communities of Gothic Christians, in either the area west of the Black Sea and along the lower Danube, according to most scholars, or in Crimea (on the northern coast of the Black Sea).

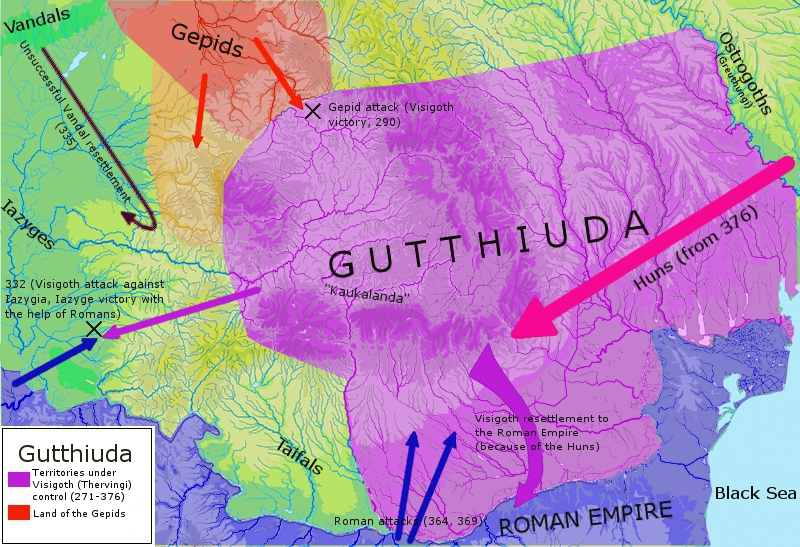
Gutthiuda, or Gothia, the country of Visigoths from about 290 to 455

According to the "Ecclesiastical History" in Nicene and Post-Nicene Fathers, one of Theophilus' disciples was the Gothic bishop Ulfilas, and since Ulfilas was among the Western Goths, this supports the position that Theophilus was from the area of the lower Danube, west of the Black Sea, with the bishop's seat at Tomi.

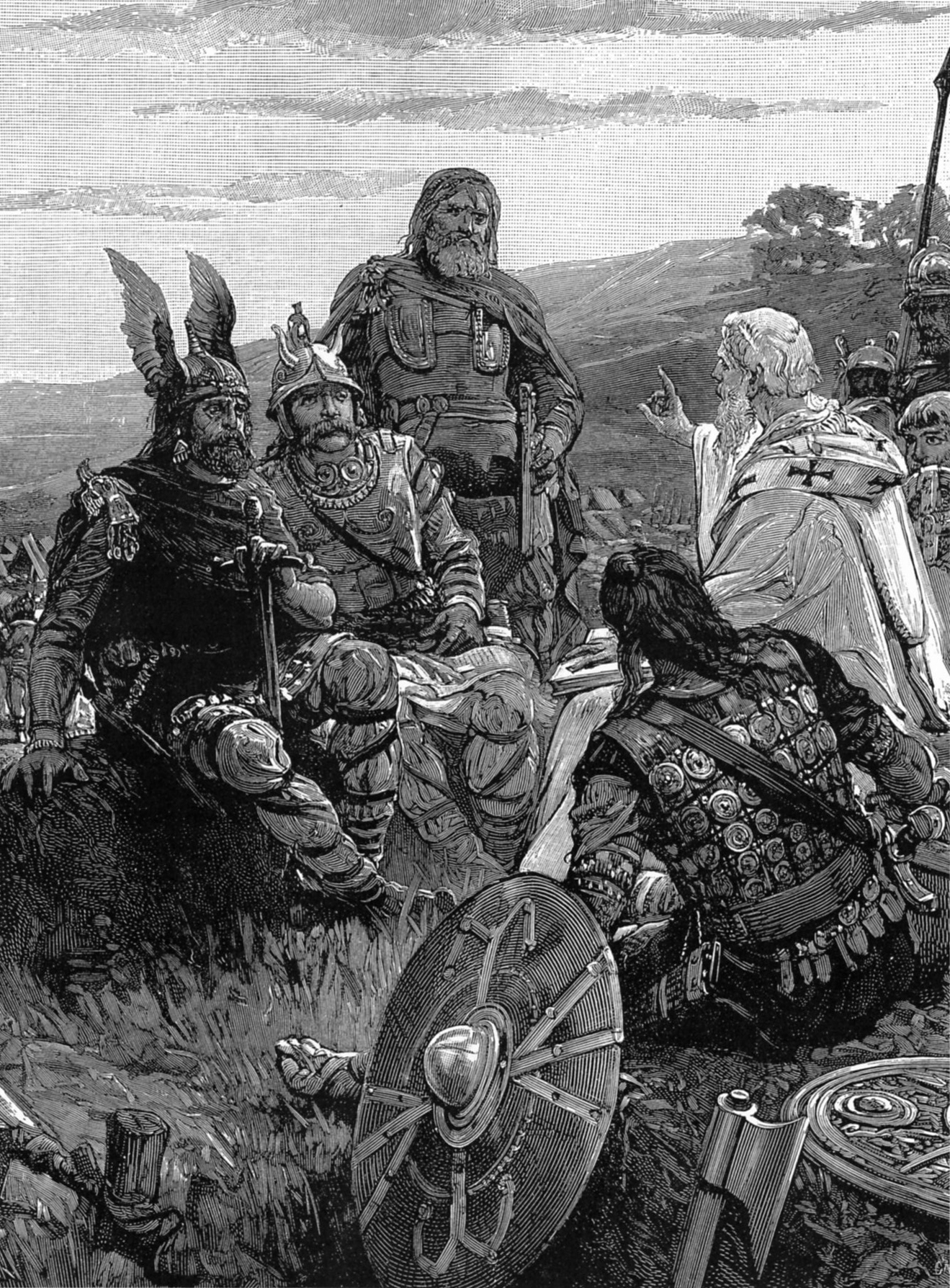
Ulfilas converting the Goths to Arian Christianity.

The Danube Goths, or Visigoths, were mostly pagans until Audius and Ulfilas spread the concept of Arianism in the 4th century, converting them to Christianity. He was succeeded as bishop by Ulfilas.

Another disciple of Theophilus was Saint Nicetas the Goth, whose eulogy included "The sainted martyr of Christ, Nicetas, lived in the reign of the Great Tsar Constantine; he was a Goth by origin, from those who lived on the river Danube. Being pious and fearing God, and living in the city of Gatan, he was instructed in the Christian faith by Theophilus, the reverend bishop of Gothia."

In Lectures on the History of the Eastern Church (1872) Artur Penrhyn Stanley speculated on the significance of the race and skin tone of Theophilus, asserting that "his light complexion doubtless made a marked contrast with the tawny hue and dark hair of almost all the rest" of the participants at the Council of Nicaea.

== See also ==
Other early bishops named Theophilus or Theophilos:

- Theophilus of Antioch (died by 185)
- Theophilus of Caesarea (died 195)
- Theophilos the Indian (died 364)
- Theophilus of Alexandria, pope 385–412

== Sources ==
- Alexander A. Vasiliev (1936). The Goths in Crimea. Cambridge, Massachusetts: The Mediaeval Academy of America.

Preceded by	Bishop of Gothia c. 325	Succeeded by Ulfilas
