= Sadagolthina =

Town of ancient Cappadocia

Coordinates: 38°49′41″N 33°32′32″E

Sadagolthina was a town of ancient Cappadocia, inhabited in Byzantine times. The town is known for being the ancestral place of Ulfilas, missionary to the Goths.

Its site is tentatively located near Karamollausağı, Asiatic Turkey.
