= Montes Serrorum =

Mountain in Romanian Carpathians

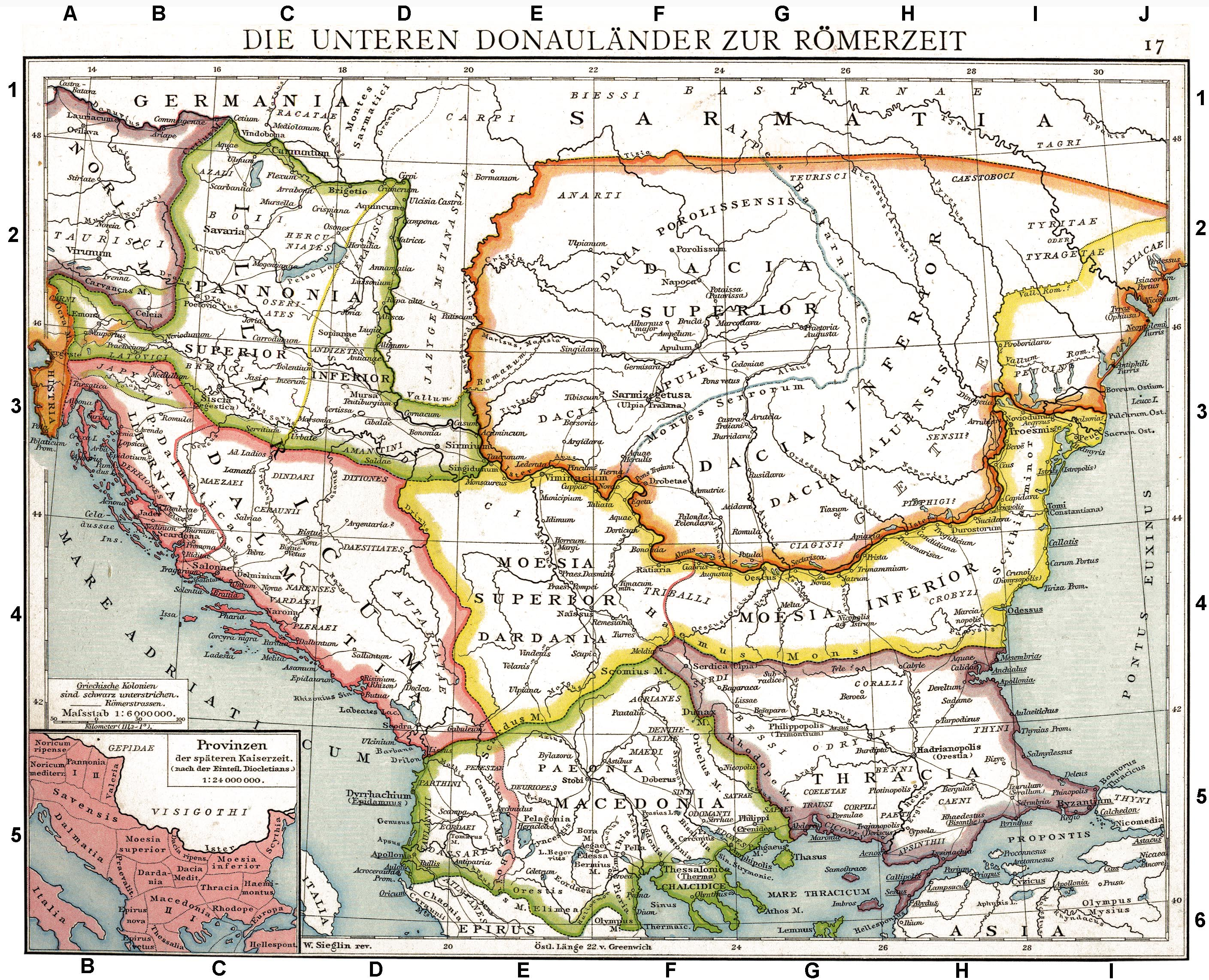
Montes Serrorum, south-east from Ulpia Traiana Sarmizegetusa on the map

Montes Serrorum (in Latin; "mountain of the Serri") is a mountain somewhere in the Carpathians mentioned by Roman soldier Ammianus Marcellinus (325–391) regarding events in the Gothic War (367–369).

In 367, the Roman Emperor Valens attacked the Thervingi (a Gothic people) north of the Danube river. However, he was unable to hit them directly, because apparently, the bulk of the Goths retreated to the Montes Serrorum. Marcellinus says that Valens could not find anyone to fight with (nullum inveniret quem superare poterat vel terrere) and even implies that all of them fled, horror-struck, to the mountains (omnes formidine perciti... montes petivere Serrorum). It was described as only accessible to those "exceedingly" familiar with the surroundings, thus the Roman troops were unable to achieve anything.

== Dispute ==
The mountain was probably located in the South-eastern Carpathians. Matei Cazacu (1972) tried to precisely locate it to the Siriul mountain range that divides Transylvania from Wallachia - the Buzău Mountains. Wanke (1990) was sceptical to Cazacu's attempt. There were attempts to etymologically derive Siriu from Romanian, Hungarian and Turkish language.

The toponym has been connected to the Sarmatian tribe Serri settled north of the Caucasus, mentioned by Pliny the Elder (23–79) in Naturalis Historia. Other considered an existence of another same-named Dacian tribe because were recorded Thracian words with the same root. Although by some it seems unlikely, the majority of scholars deem the Sarmatian tribal connection as the most credible explanation because it is also similar to other ancient names of the Carpathians, Sarmatian Mountains and Alpes Bastarnicae, the fact Marcellinus reported about the Caucaland referring to the Carpathians, making Montes Serrorum a made-up geographical name.

Konstantin Jireček (1854–1918) also connected the toponym with Pliny's Serri, but according to him they were "Caucasian Serbs". Slovene anthropologist Niko Županič (1876–1961) treated the toponym as evidence of "Serb presence in Dacia", and this view was supported by Ivo Vukcevich (2001), but the fringe theory in turn was discredited by Florin Curta for being based on a "dubious etymology".

The toponym Montes Serrorum in another version of the manuscript is written as Montes Succorum, however, although the root "suc-" is reported in several toponyms of the time in the region, the form is a result of writing error.
