= Gothic persecution of Christians =

Persecution of Christians by the Goths in the 4th century

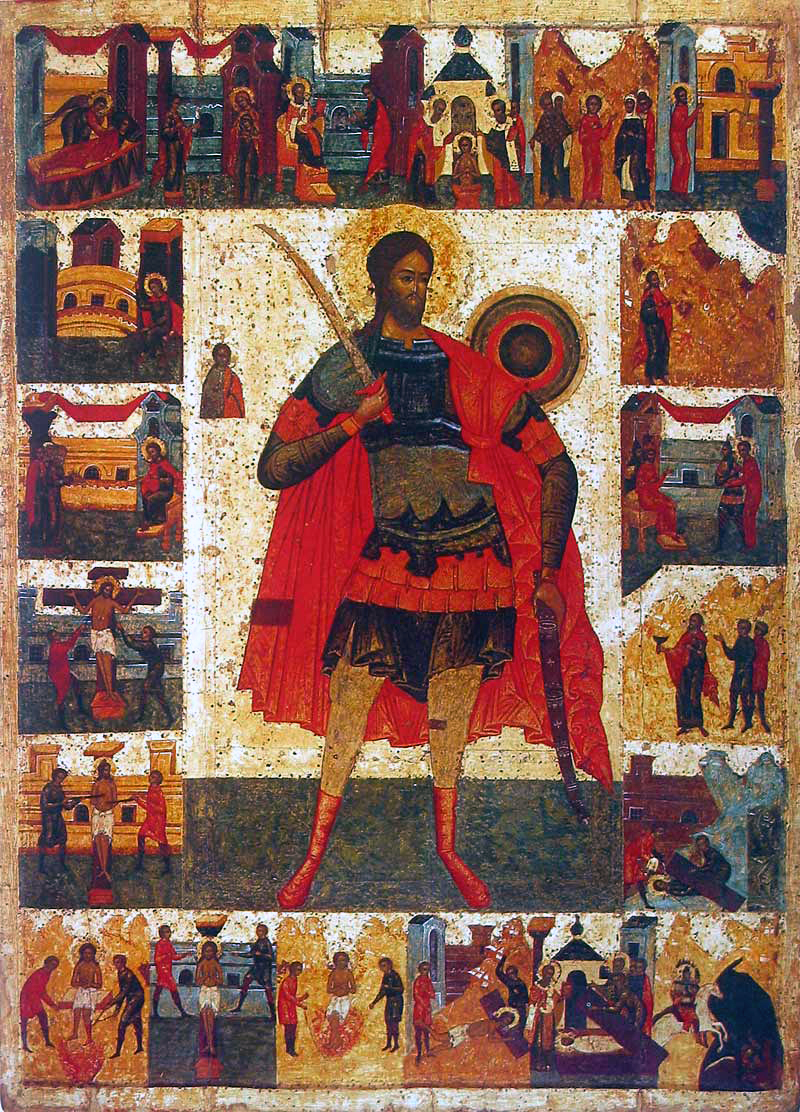
Icon of Saint Nicetas from Yaroslavl (16th century)

There is a record of Gothic persecution of Christians in the third century. According to Basil of Caesarea, some prisoners taken captive in a Gothic raid on Cappadocia around 260 preached the gospel to their captors and were martyred. One of their names was Eutychus. Bishop Dionysius of Caesarea sent messengers to the Goths to ransom captives and there was still a written record of these attempts in Basil's time.

== History ==
Two main outbreaks of persecution of Christians by the 4th-century Gothic authorities are recorded, in 347/8 under Aoric (according to Auxentius of Durostorum) and between 367 and 378 under Aoric's son, the iudex (kindins) Athanaric. The persecution of Christians under Athanaric shows that Christians were still a minority among the Tervingi in the 370s, but that they had become numerous enough to be considered a threat to Gothic culture. It is remarkable that Athanaric did not persecute Christians in general, but specifically converted Goths, while Christian foreigners were left alone. Athanaric's motive was thus the protection of the Gothic nation and its gods and not the persecution of Christianity as such.

The Terving ruler Athanaric opposed the spread of Christianity among the Goths, fearing that the new faith would destroy Gothic culture. According to the historiographer Sozomenos (Eccl. Hist. 6.37), Athanaric appointed Winguric (Wingureiks, Wingourichos, also Jungeric) to eradicate the Christian faith from the Gothic lands. In Crimea, Winguric placed an idol in a chariot and paraded it before a tent used by Christians for their church service; those who worshipped the idol were spared, and the rest were burned alive in the tent. A total of 308 people died in the fire, of which only 21 are known by name. This happened in or close to the year 375. A few years later, during the reign of Valentinian and Theodosius (383–392), Gaatha, the widow of a peer of Winguric's, and her daughter Dulcilla (or Duclida, Duklida) gathered the remains of twenty-six martyrs and with the help of some priests and a layman named Thyellas transferred them to Cyzicus.

The martyrs who died under Athanaric's persecution known by name are three clerics and 18 laypeople (11 men, 7 women). To this are added the four children of Wereka and Batwin (two sons and two daughters), plus an anonymous man who came to the tent and confessed Christ as Winguric was about to burn it and was martyred together with the others, to arrive at the number of "twenty-six martyrs" whose remains were transported by Gaatha. The 21 martyrs known by name are recorded with multiple variants in manuscript tradition:

- Werekas (or Ouerkas, Vercus), a papa or priest,
- Batwin (or Bathouses, Bathusius), a bilaifs (minister?)
- Arpulas (Arpilus), a monk,
- eleven laymen: Abippas (Abibus), Hagias (Agnus), Ruias (Reas), Egathrax (Igathrax), Eskoes (Iscous), Silas, Sigetzas (Signicus), Swerilas (Sonerilas), Swemblas (Suimbalus), Therthas (Thermus), and Philgas (Phillus),
- seven laywomen Anna, Alas (Alla), Baren (Beride, also recorded as Larissa), Moiko (Monco), Kamika (Mamika), Oneko (Virko), and Anemais (Animais, Animaida),

The list includes Syrian, Cappadocian and Phrygian names, even though the victims were all Goths. This may reflect the Christian practice of assuming a new "Christian name" at baptism, and in any case documents the close connection of the Gothic church with those of Asia Minor (where the invading Goths in the mid 3rd century first came into contact with Christianity).

The "26 Gothic martyrs" are commemorated in Orthodox Christianity on 26 March, but in the Gothic calendar fragment on 29 October (gaminþi marwtre þize bi Werekan papan jah Batwin bilaif. aikklesjons fullaizos ana Gutþiudai gabrannidai "remembrance of the martyrs who with Werekas the priest and Batwin the bilaif were burned in a crowded church among the Goths"). The same fragment for 23 October proscribes remembrance of "the many martyrs among the Gothic people, and of Fridaric" (þize ana Gutþiudai managaize martwre jah Friþareikeis), Fridaric being an otherwise unknown Gothic martyr.

Eastern Orthodox martyrologies enumerate "Twenty-six Martyred Goths", listing the 21 names given above, but adding one Constans as a twelfth layman, plus queen Gaatha along with her daughter Dulcilla and her son Agathon.

Sabbas the Goth was martyred in 372 in what is now the Wallachia region of Romania. Nicetas the Goth was also martyred in 372.

== See also ==
- Gothic paganism
- Gothic Christianity
- Germanic Christianity

== Sources ==
- Cassia, Margherita (2019). "Between Paganism and Judaism: Early Christianity in Cappadocia". In Stephen Mitchell; Philipp Pilhofer (eds.). Early Christianity in Asia Minor and Cyprus: From the Margins to the Mainstream. Early Christianity in Asia Minor, Volume 109. Leiden: Brill. pp. 13–48.
- Peter Heather, John Matthews, "Martyrs and Martyrologies" in: Goths in the Fourth Century (1991), 96–123.
- Herwig Wolfram, Thomas J. Dunlap (trans.), History of the Goths (1990), 81–83.
- Holweck, F. G., A Biographical Dictionary of the Saints. St. Louis, MO: B. Herder Book Co. 1924.
