= Ragnaris =

Pro-Ostrogothic Hunnic warlord

Ragnaris (Greek spelling Ῥάγναρις, Ῥαγναρίς, Ῥαγναρῆς; Germanic, died 555) was a Hunnic warlord who fought for the Ostrogoths in the final stages of the Gothic War against the Eastern Roman Empire. Procopius calls him a Goth, but the better informed Agathias records that he was of the Hunnic tribe of the Vittores or Vitgores (possibly the Bittugures mentioned in Jordanes).

== History ==
Ragnaris is first mentioned as the commander of the Ostrogothic garrison of Taranto in 552. According to Procopius, he began negotiations with the Eastern Roman general Pacurius for surrendering the city and entering imperial service with his men, but when he learned of the accession of Teia to the Ostrogothic throne he changed his mind. He took fifty Roman soldiers hostage so as to secure the release of his own men held by Pacurius, but the latter marched against him and he had them executed. Ragnaris did not await Pacurius behind his walls, but sallied forth to meet him in open battle, in which he was defeated. The Tarentines then refused to allow him to enter the city, forcing him to flee to nearby Acheruntia.

He reappears in late 554 as the leader of 7,000 Gothic troops, possibly survivors of Teia's last stand at the Battle of Mons Lactarius. Resolved to continue resisting the Romans, he led them to occupy the fortress of Compsa. The Eastern Roman general Narses laid siege to them in the winter, but the Goths were easily able to hold out, having secured large provisions. In spring, Narses and Ragnaris met to discuss possible terms, but could not agree. As they parted, however, Ragnaris tried to shoot Narses with an arrow, whereupon he was set upon and severely wounded by the general's bodyguards. His followers managed to carry him into the fortress, but he died two days later, and the final Gothic stronghold surrendered.

== Sources ==
- Amory, Patrick (2003). People and Identity in Ostrogothic Italy, 489-554. Cambridge University Press. ISBN 0521526353.
- Maenchen-Helfen, Otto J. (1973). The World of the Huns: Studies in Their History and Culture. University of California Press. ISBN 0520015967.
- Martindale, John R., ed. (1992). The Prosopography of the Later Roman Empire: Volume III, AD 527–641. Cambridge: Cambridge University Press. ISBN 0-521-20160-8.
