= Ulfilas =

Goth bishop and theologian (c. 311–383)

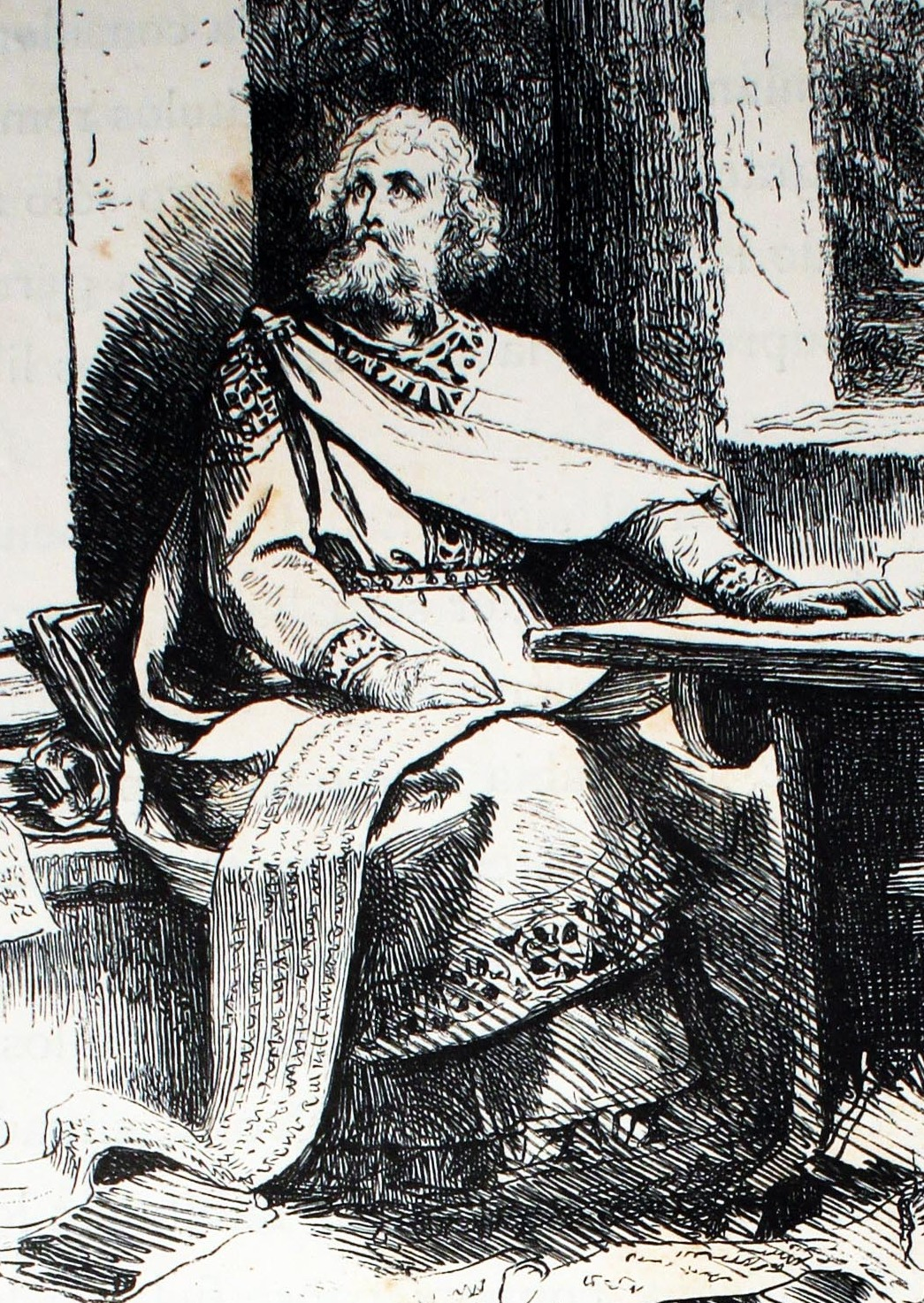
- Ulfilas Translates the Bible by Willhelm Lindenschmit, 1879
- Born: c. 311; Roman Dacia
- Died: 383 (aged 71–72); Constantinople, Byzantine Empire
- Known for: Overseeing translation of the Bible into Gothic

Ecclesiastical career
- Title: Apostle of the Goths; Confessor of the Faith

Ulfilas (Ancient Greek: Οὐλφίλας; c. 311 – 383), (Note: Also spelled Ulphilas and Orphila, all Latinized forms of the unattested Gothic form *𐍅𐌿𐌻𐍆𐌹𐌻𐌰 *Wulfila, literally 'Little Wolf'. There is no consensus among scholars as to what can be considered the correct form of Ulfila's name.) known also as Wulfila(s) or Urphilas, was a 4th-century Gothic preacher of Cappadocian Greek descent. He was the apostle to the Gothic people.

Ulfila served as a bishop and missionary, participated in the Arian controversy, and is credited with converting the Goths to Christianity as well as overseeing translation of the Bible into the Gothic language. For the purpose of the translation he developed the Gothic alphabet, largely based on the Greek alphabet, as well as Latin and Runic characters. Although the translation of the text into Gothic has traditionally been ascribed to Ulfila, analysis of the text of the Gothic Bible indicates the involvement of a team of translators, possibly under his supervision.

== Life ==
Ulfila is mentioned by the Nicene Christians Socrates of Constantinople, Sozomen, and Theodoret, in addition to the Eunomian historian Philostorgius. He is also mentioned by the Gothic historian Jordanes, although the writer said comparatively little of him. The dominant and most important account of Ulfila's life comes from a 4th century letter from his pupil, Auxentius of Durostorum, who wrote it immediately after his death. A summary by Photios I of Philostorgius' Ecclesiastical History is also significant, but references to Ulfila's life are generally scarce, and he was omitted from Jerome's De Viris Illustribus.

Around the year 311, (Note: Romanist Hagith Sivan of the University of Kansas alternatively puts Ulfila's birth c. 310.) Ulfila was born presumably in what is now modern Romania. He was partially descended from Roman prisoners who were captured in a raid by Goths at Sadagolthina and carried away from Asia Minor. His ancestors were likely kidnapped by Western Goths in 264 or 267 then brought to an area near the Danube river. (Note: Historian Herwig Wolfram places the date of his ancestors' capture by Danubian Goths in 257. Ulfila was born a third-generation Goth.) Prisoners taken in such raids from Anatolia were usually unrepentant Christians, and Ulfila was raised as a Christian in a pagan society. He lived in a diaspora community composed of Cappadocian Christians under the Thervingi between the Olt, Dniester, and Danube. It is believed that he was Cappadocian Greek on his maternal line and of Gothic descent through his father. (Note: According to German theologian Knut Schäferdiek, it is unsure whether Ulfila's mother was definitively from Cappadocia.) Ulfila was either raised by Goths in his childhood as a captive or was born in captivity to Cappadocian parents.

No sources exist concerning Ulfila's education. However, he was a lector in a church in Gothia by age thirty, which required study of the Bible and prepared him as a translator. Since services were rendered in the Gothic language, he may have already had both the ability to translate and read. According to Philostorgius, he was sent by the Goths during the reign of Constantine I as an ambassador to the Roman Empire, where he was consecrated as the bishop of Gothia by the Arian Eusebius of Nicomedia. (Note: Ulfila's rapid ascension to a bishop indicated some previous distinction he held, having never become a deacon or presbyter before assuming the position. Herwig Wolfram notes that "since Ulfila's episcopal commission was apparently valid not only for the Gothic gens but for all the 'Getic land,' he must have been recognized also by the non-Gothic peoples of the Gutthiuda, above all by the Romans".) The Romans saw Ulfila as pontifex ipseque primas (bishop and tribal leader); Constantius II supposedly described him as the era's Moses and he was additionally compared to the prophet Elijah. His first journey to Constantinople was made between 332 and 337 for the purpose of accompanying a Gothic delegation, and he possibly lived in the city for a time with Aoric. His consecration took place in either 336 or 341. (Note: Most scholars associate Ulfila's consecration with the council at Antioch in 341. According to classicist Timothy Barnes, "[they] have explained Philostorgius' dating as due either to confusion of the names of Constantine and Constantius (in itself a very frequent phenomenon) or to a mistaken retrojection of later events".)

=== Bishop ===
Ulfila would master both Greek and Latin during his life, and as bishop he wrote theological and exegetical treatises in both languages. In 341, he returned to Gothia, spending the following seven years working to explain and confirm the doctrine of Arianism among existing adherents and the unconverted. His pursuits were abruptly ended in 348, when a Thervingian iudex began the persecution of Christians in the area. The exact catalyst of the persecution is unknown. (Note: Herwig Wolfram speculates that the persecution took place "most likely after a war with the Romans". Evidence from Libanius and Cyril of Jerusalem suggested a crisis of Roman–Gothic relations. Academic Maurice Wiles writes that "to the Goths Ulfila's missionary activity is likely to have appeared as a form of Roman infiltration".) Ulfila and his followers were expelled and fled to the Roman provinces, where they were accepted by Constantius II. Ulfila then established himself in the mountains near Nicopolis in Moesia Inferior, with no evidence that he would ever return north of the Danube. He had been the only religious and political leader of Christian Goths at the time of the expulsion, after which he held the honorary title of confessor. His followers were shepherds, and their descendants remained 200 years later in Nicopolis as a poor and docile community.

For 33 years Ulfila continued to serve as bishop and attended church councils. Little is known about his life in Moesia, but he resumed preaching and likely exercised the office of chorepiscopus (Greek: χώρα). Most of his theological works, including the translation of the Bible from Greek into Gothic, were likely to have been produced in this period. He seemed to have remained the temporal and spiritual leader of the Christian Goths in Nicopolis, possibly exerting influence beyond the Roman frontier into Gothia as well. He also engaged in theological debates and subscribed to Homoeanism, which became established at the 357 Council of Sirmium.

Ulfila was present at the Council of Constantinople in 360, where he endorsed the council's creed and represented the Moesian Goths as their leader. The Roman emperors during the tenure of his bishopric were generally sympathetic to Arianism, though the situation changed near the end of his life. In 380, Theodosius I issued a law against heresy, supported the First Council of Nicaea, and deposed the Arian Demophilus of Constantinople in favor of orthodoxy. The next year, he confiscated all church property belonging to heretics and banned all heterodox religious meetings. After the convocation of the Second Ecumenical Council, the Arian bishops Palladius of Ratiaria and Secundianus of Singidunum were anathematized. Ulfila would journey with them to Constantinople upon being ordered by Theodosius to attend a disputation. He likely traveled to the city in 383, although the emperor came to reject the Homoian position. Ulfila soon became ill, died, and was buried soon after, though not before drafting a creed affirming his belief in Homoianism. He was succeeded as bishop by the Gotho-Phrygian Selenas.

== Translation of the Bible ==
The traditional date for Ulfila's completion of religious texts for the Goths of Moesia is around 369. Cassiodorus attests that he "invented the Gothic letters and translated the divine scriptures into that language". Walafrid Strabo wrote that "(a team of) scholars translated the sacred books". There is no primary evidence to support the traditional assumption that Ulfila translated the Bible into Gothic; the brief mentions of Ulfila as a translator in the works of ancient historians count only as circumstantial evidence. Authoritative scholarly opinion, based on rigorous analysis of the linguistic properties of the Gothic text, holds that the Gothic Bible was authored by a group of translators. This does not rule out the possibility that, while overseeing the translation of the Bible, Ulfila was one of several translators.

== Creed of Ulfila ==
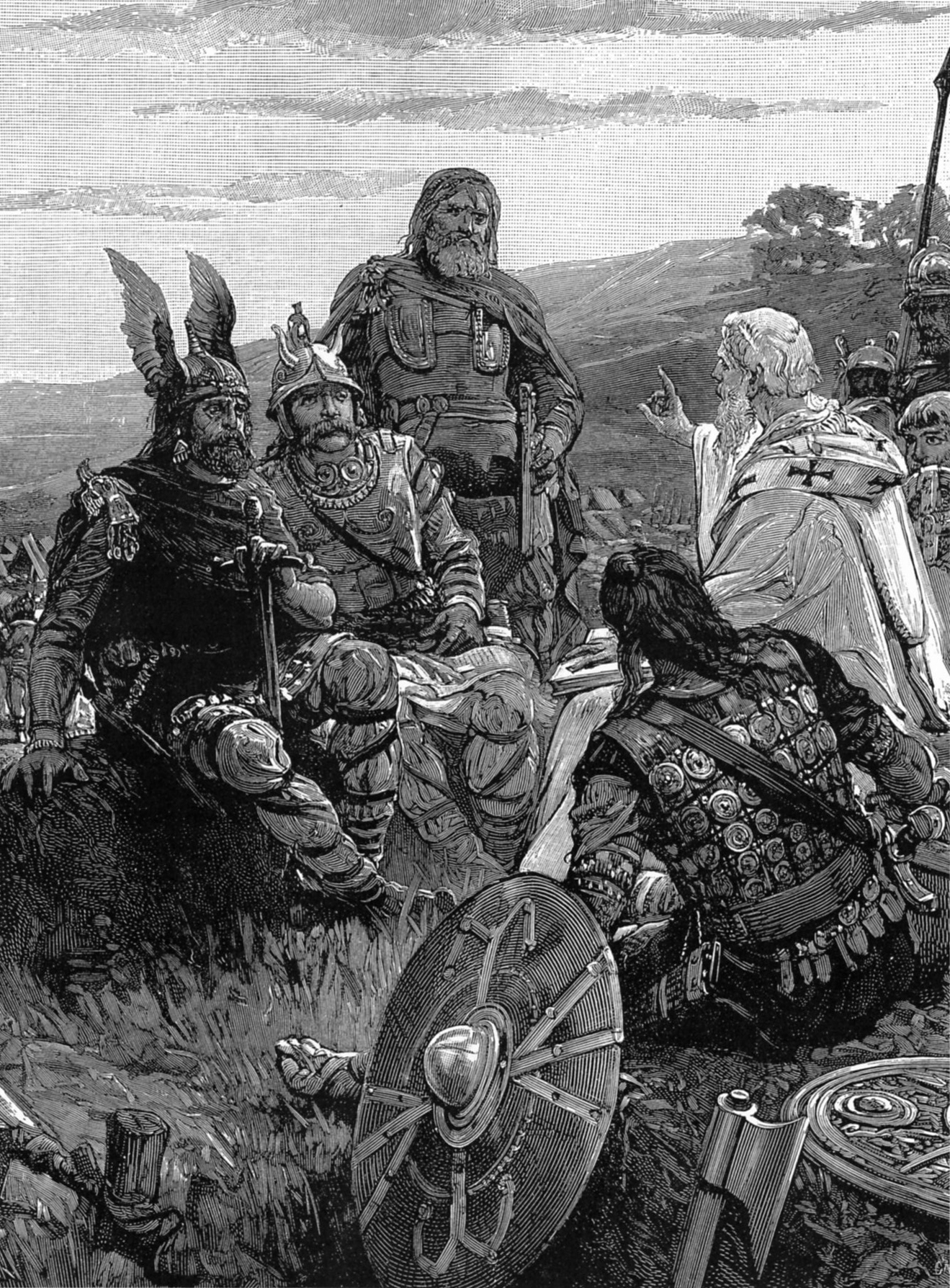
Ulfila explaining the Gospels to the Goths

The Creed of Ulfila concludes a letter praising him written by his foster son and pupil Auxentius of Durostorum. It distinguishes God the Father ("unbegotten") from God the Son ("only-begotten"), who was begotten before time and created the world, and the Holy Spirit, proceeding from the Father and the Son:

I, Ulfila, bishop and confessor, have always so believed, and in this, the one true faith, I make the journey to my Lord; I believe in one God the Father, the only unbegotten and invisible, and in his only-begotten son, our Lord and God, the designer and maker of all creation, having none other like him (so that one alone among all beings is God the Father, who is also the God of our God); and in one Holy Ghost, the illuminating and sanctifying power, as Christ said after his resurrection to his apostles: "And behold, I send the promise of my Father upon you; but tarry ye in the city of Jerusalem, until ye be clothed with power from on high" (Luke 24:49) and again "But ye shall receive power, when the Holy Ghost is come upon you" (Acts 1:8); being neither God (the Father) nor our God (Christ), but the minister of Christ... subject and obedient in all things to the Son; and the Son, subject and obedient in all things to God who is his Father... (whom) he ordained in the Holy Ghost through his Christ.

Maximinus, a 5th-century Arian theologian, copied Auxentius's letter, among other works, into the margins of one copy of Ambrose's De Fide; there are some gaps in the surviving text.

== Honours ==
- Wulfila Glacier on Greenwich Island in the South Shetland Islands, Antarctica is named after Bishop Ulfila.
- Part of the Walhalla (memorial) in Bavaria, Germany.

== See also ==
- Mardonius
- Gothic Bible
- Gothic Christianity
- Germanic Christianity

== Bibliography ==
- H. C. von Gabelentz, J. Loebe, Ulfila: Veteris et Novi Testamenti Versionis Gothicae fragmenta quae supersunt, Leipzig, Libraria Schnuphasiana, 1843.
- Carla Falluomini, The Gothic Version of the Gospels and Pauline Epistles. Cultural Background, Transmission and Character, Berlino, Walter de Gruyter, 2015 (Capitolo 1: "Wulfila and his context", pp. 4–24.)
- Heather, Peter J.; Matthews, John (1991). The Goths in the Fourth Century. Liverpool University Press. Contains translations of selected texts: Chapter 5. The Life and Work of Ulfila, 124; 6. The Gothic Bible 145; 7. Selections from the Gothic Bible 163–185.
- Bennett, William Holmes (1980). An Introduction to the Gothic Language. New York City: The Modern Language Association of America. ISBN 978-0-87352-295-3.
- Rubin, Zeev (1981). "The Conversion of the Visigoths to Christianity". Museum Helveticum. 38 (1). Schwabe Verlag: 34–54. JSTOR 24815706.
- Wolfram, Herwig (1988) [1979]. History of the Goths. Translated by Dunlap, Thomas J. (2nd ed.). Berkeley, California: University of California Press. ISBN 978-0-520-05259-8.
- Barnes, Timothy (October 1990). "The Consecration of Ulfila". The Journal of Theological Studies. 41 (2). Oxford University Press: 541–545. doi:10.1093/jts/41.2.541. JSTOR 23965598.
- Ebbinghaus, Ernst A. (1991). "Ulfila(s) or Wulfila?". Historische Sprachforschung. 104 (2). Vandenhoeck & Ruprecht: 236–238. JSTOR 40849028.
- Colette M., Van Kerckvoorde (1993). An Introduction to Middle Dutch. Walter de Gruyter. ISBN 3-11-013535-3.
- Sivan, Hagith (October 1996). "Ulfila's Own Conversion". The Harvard Theological Review. 89 (4). Cambridge, Massachusetts: Cambridge University Press: 373–386. doi:10.1017/S0017816000006106. JSTOR 1509923.
- Wiles, Maurice (1996). Archetypal Heresy: Arianism through the Centuries. Oxford, England: Oxford University Press. ISBN 978-0-19152059-4. OCLC 344023364.
- Mathisen, Ralph W. (July 1997). "Barbarian Bishops and the Churches "in Barbaricis Gentibus" During Late Antiquity". Speculum. 72 (3). University of Chicago Press: 664–697. doi:10.2307/3040758. JSTOR 3040758.
- Thompson, Edward Arthur (2008) [1966]. Kulikowski, Michael (ed.). The Visigoths in the Time of Ulfila (2nd ed.). London, England: Duckworth Books. ISBN 978-0-7156-3700-5.
- Ratkus, Artūras (2009). "The Greek Sources of the Gothic Bible Translation". Vertimo Studijos. 2 (2). Vilnius University: 37. doi:10.15388/VertStud.2009.2.10602. ISSN 2029-4050. S2CID 194725062.
- Kaylor, Noel Harold; Philips, Philip Edward (2012). A Companion to Boethius in the Middle Ages (1st ed.). Brill Publishers. ISBN 978-9004183544.
- Parvis, Sara (2016). "Was Ulfila Really a Homoian?". In Berndt, Guido M.; Steinacher, Roland (eds.). Arianism: Roman Heresy and Barbarian Creed. Ashgate Publishing. pp. 49–67. ISBN 9781317178651.
- Schäferdiek, Knut (2016). "Ulfila and the so-called 'Gothic' Arianism". In Berndt, Guido M.; Steinacher, Roland (eds.). Arianism: Roman Heresy and Barbarian Creed. Ashgate Publishing. pp. 45–49. ISBN 9781317178651.
- Miller, D. Gary (June 17, 2019). The Oxford Gothic Grammar. Oxford University Press. doi:10.1093/oso/9780198813590.001.0001. ISBN 9780198813590.

Preceded by Theophilus	Bishop of Gothia sometime after 325 until his death	Succeeded by Selina
