= Riek =

Riek is a surname and given name. Notable people with the name include:

== As a given name ==
- Riek Schagen (1913–2008), Dutch actress and painter
- Riek Machar (born 1953), South Sudanese politician
- Riek Gai Kok, South Sudanese politician

== As a surname ==
- Edgar Riek (1920–2016), Australian entomologist
- Gustav Riek (1900–1976), German archaeologist
- Sarah-Lorraine Riek (born 1992) German actress and model

== See also ==
- Reik (surname)
