= Gothic Christianity =

Christianity as practiced by the ancient Goths

Gothic Christianity refers to the Christian religion of the Goths and sometimes non-Gothic tribes, such as the Gepids, Vandals, and Burgundians, who may have used the translation of the Bible into the Gothic language and shared common doctrines and practices.

Germanic peoples, including the Goths, migrated into the Roman Empire in the 4th century and conquered and ruled most of the Western Roman Empire for most of the 5th century.

The Gothic tribes converted to Christianity sometime between 376 and 390 AD, around the time of the fall of the Western Roman Empire. Gothic Christianity is the earliest instance of the Christianization of a Germanic people, completed more than a century before the baptism of Frankish king Clovis I.

The Gothic Christians were followers of Arianism. Many church members, from simple believers, priests, and monks to bishops, emperors, and members of Rome's imperial family followed this doctrine, as did two Roman emperors, Constantius II and Valens.

After their sack of Rome, the Visigoths moved on to occupy Spain and southern France. Having been driven out of France, the Spanish Goths formally embraced Nicene Christianity at the Third Council of Toledo in 589.

== Origins ==
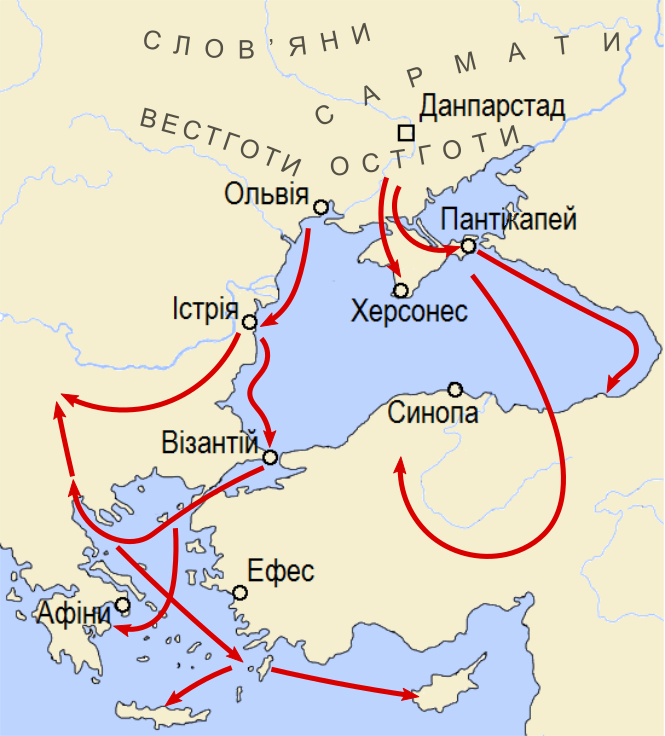
Gothic place of settlement and their raids into the Roman Empire in the 3rd century

During the 3rd century, East Germanic people, moving in a southeasterly direction, migrated into the Dacians' territories previously under Sarmatian and Roman control, and the confluence of East Germanic, Sarmatian, Dacian and Roman cultures resulted in the emergence of a new Gothic identity. Part of this identity was adherence to Gothic paganism, the exact nature of which, however, remains uncertain. Jordanes' 6th-century Getica claims the chief god of the Goths was Mars. Gothic paganism is a form of Germanic paganism.

Descriptions of Gothic and Vandal warfare appear in Roman records in Late Antiquity. At times these groups warred against or allied with the Roman Empire, the Huns, and various Germanic tribes. In 251 AD, the Gothic army raided the Roman provinces of Moesia and Thrace, defeated and killed the Roman emperor Decius, and took a number of predominantly female captives, many of which were Christian. This is assumed to represent the first lasting contact of the Goths with Christianity.

== Conversion ==
The conversion of the Goths to Christianity was a relatively swift process, facilitated both by the assimilation of Christian captives into Gothic society and by linking participation in Roman society with adherence to Christianity. The Homoians in the Danubian provinces played a major role in the conversion of the Goths to Arianism. Within a few generations of their appearance on the borders of the Empire in 238 AD, the conversion of the Goths to Christianity was nearly all-inclusive.

The Christian cross appeared on coins in Gothic Crimea shortly after the Edict of Tolerance was issued by Galerius in 311 AD, and a bishop by the name of Theophilas Gothiae was present at the First Council of Nicaea in 325 AD. However, fighting between Pagan and Christian Goths continued throughout this period, and religious persecutions – echoing the Diocletianic Persecution (302–11 AD) – occurred frequently. The Christian Goths Wereka and Batwin and others were martyred by order of Wingurich ca. 370 AD, and Sabbas the Goth was martyred in c. 372 AD.

Even as late as 406, a Gothic king by the name of Radagaisus led a Pagan invasion of Italy with fierce anti-Christian views.

== Bishop Ulfilas ==
The initial success experienced by the Goths encouraged them to engage in a series of raiding campaigns at the close of the 3rd century, many of which resulted in having numerous captives sent back to Gothic settlements north of the Danube and the Black Sea. Ulfilas, who became bishop of the Goths in 341 AD, was the grandson of one such female Christian captive from Sadagolthina in Cappadocia. He served in this position for the next seven years. In 348, one of the remaining Pagan Gothic kings (reikos) began persecuting the Christian Goths, and he and many other Christian Goths fled to Moesia Secunda in the Roman Empire. He continued to serve as bishop to the Christian Goths in Moesia until his death in 383 AD, according to Philostorgius.

Ulfilas was ordained by Eusebius of Nicomedia, the bishop of Constantinople, in 341 AD. Eusebius was a pupil of Lucian of Antioch and a leading figure of a faction of Christological thought that became known as Arianism, named after his friend and fellow student, Arius.

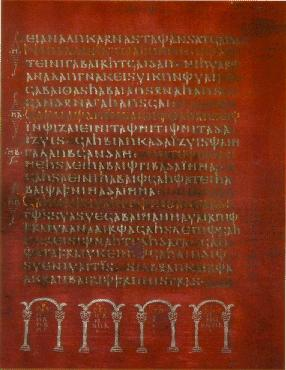
First page of the Codex Argenteus, the oldest surviving manuscript of the 4th-century Bible translation into Gothic.

Between 348 and 383, Ulfilas likely presided over the translation of the Bible from Greek into the Gothic language, which was performed by a group of scholars. Thus, some Arian Christians in the west used vernacular languages – in this case Gothic – for services, as did many Nicaean Christians in the east (the Syriac and Coptic translations), while Nicaean Christians in the west only used Latin, even in areas where Vulgar Latin was not the vernacular. Gothic probably persisted as a liturgical language of the Gothic-Arian church in some places even after its members had come to speak Vulgar Latin as their mother tongue.

Ulfilas' adopted son was Auxentius of Durostorum, and later of Milan.

== Later Gothic Christianity ==
The Gothic churches had close ties to other Arian churches in the Western Roman Empire.

After 493, the Ostrogothic Kingdom included two areas, Italy and much of the Balkans, which had large Arian churches. Arianism had retained some presence among Romans in Italy during the time between its condemnation in the empire and the Ostrogothic conquest. However, since Arianism in Italy was reinforced by the (mostly Arian) Goths coming from the Balkans, the Arian church in Italy had eventually come to call itself "Church of the Goths" by the year 500.
