= Greuthungi =

3rd-4th–century Gothic tribe of the Pontic steppe

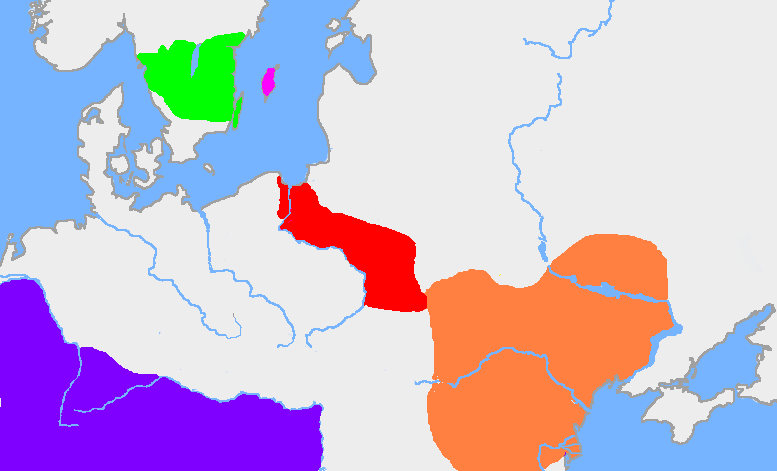
Land of the Geats (Götaland) Gotland Wielbark culture in the early 3rd century Chernyakhov culture (often identified with the Greuthungi) in the early 4th century Roman Empire

The Greuthungi (also spelled Greutungi) were a Gothic people who lived on the Pontic steppe between the Dniester and Don rivers in what is now Ukraine, in the 3rd and the 4th centuries. They had close contacts with the Tervingi, another Gothic people, who lived west of the Dniester River. To the east of the Greuthungi, living near the Don river, were the Alans. As such, both the Greuthungi and Tervingi can be identified with the archeaological sites known collectively as the Chernyakhov culture.

When the Huns arrived in the European Steppe region in the late 4th century, first the Alans were forced to join them, and then a part of the Greuthungi. Alans and Goths became an important part of Attila's forces, together with other eastern European peoples. Many Greuthungi, together with some Alans and Huns, crossed the Lower Danube to join a large group of Tervingi who had entered the Roman Empire in 376. These peoples defeated an imperial army in the Battle of Adrianople in 378, and came to a settlement agreement within the Roman empire by 382 AD. The original tribal names of the Goths fell out of use within the empire. Many of the 382 settlers appear to have become an important component of the Visigoths who formed under Alaric I.

Based upon interpretations of the Getica by the 6th century writer Jordanes, although it never mentions the Greuthungi, the Greuthungi are strongly associated with both the Gothic king Ermanaric, and the later Amal dynasty who were among Attila's Goths. After the collapse of Attila's empire, the Amals founded the Ostrogothic kingdom in the Roman Balkans.

== Etymology ==
The root greut- is probably related to the Old English greot, meaning "gravel, grit, earth", thus implying that the name refers to a geographical region where the Greuthungi lived.

It has been argued, for example by Herwig Wolfram, who agrees with the older position of Franz Altheim that this is part of a body of evidence that geographic descriptors were commonly used to distinguish people living north of the Black Sea – both before and after Gothic settlement there.

More specifically, Wolfram argues that the name Greuthungi may indicate that they lived on gritty steppes or "pebbly coasts", and should be seen as contrasting with the Tervingi Goths, whose name may be related to the English word "tree" and indicate a forest origin.

Another proposal is that the name of the Greuthungi goes back to a time when Goths apparently lived near the Vistula, and that the name is connected to the Polish place-name on that river, Grudziądz.

It has also been proposed that the name Greuthungi has pre-Pontic Scandinavian origins, earlier than the Vistula settlement. Wolfram for example notes that J. Svennung, has proposed that it may mean "rock people", and refer to a rocky homeland west of the Gauts in what is today Götaland in southern Sweden.

It has also been noted by some scholars, starting with Karl Müllenhoff in the 19th century, that in a list of peoples living on the island of Scandza, Jordanes listed "Mixi, Evagre, and Otingis" among those who "live like wild animals in rocks hewn out like castles". Müllenhoff proposed that the last part referred to the Greutungi, but no consensus has arisen to explain all the names of peoples in this list.

== History ==
The Goths more generally came into importance in the third century, but concerning this period the Greuthungi are only mentioned in the Historia Augusta, which is an unreliable work written centuries later. The part concerning Emperor Claudius Gothicus (reigned 268–270), the following list of "Scythian" peoples is given who had been conquered by that emperor when he earned his title "Gothicus": "peuci trutungi austorgoti uirtingi sigy pedes celtae etiam eruli". These words are traditionally edited by adapted editors to include well-known peoples: "Peuci, Grutungi, Austrogothi, Tervingi, Visi, Gipedes, Celtae etiam et Eruli". The Historia Augusta text concerning the Emperor Probus (died 282), mentions the Greuthungi together with Vandals and Gepids, who were supposedly settled in Thrace, together with 100,000 Bastarnae. While the Bastarnae remained faithful, the other three peoples broke faith and were crushed by Probus, according to this account.

The first event which can confidently be ascribed to the Greuthungi was much later, in the 369 campaign against the Goths by Emperor Valens, in retribution for the support of the usurper Procopius (died 366). This was described by Ammianus Marcellinus writing in the 390s, only decades later. Valens crossed the Lower Danube at Novidunum and went deep into Gothic territory where he came across the warlike people called the Greuthungi. Their apparent leader Athanaric who was, in this passage, described by Ammianus as their most powerful judge ("iudicem potentissimum"), was compelled to flee, and then make a peace agreement in the middle of the Danube, promising to never set foot on Roman soil. This same Athanaric is later described by Ammianus as a judge of the Tervingi, raising questions about the nature of the distinction between the Tervingi and Greuthungi. Ammianus specifically describes the Greuthungi as Goths.

The Greuthungi were next mentioned by Ammianus as defeated by the invading Huns in the early 370s. The Huns first plundered and recruited the Alans of the Don river (the classical Tanais) and then attacked the domain of the warlike Gothic monarch King Ermenric, who was apparently king of the Greuthungi, and who eventually committed suicide. Jordanes in his history of the Goths, the Getica, written much later in about 551, did not mention the Greuthungi, but instead writes as if the Ukrainian Goths were divided between the eastern Ostrogoths and western Visigoths in the 3rd and 4th centuries, using the terms for two Gothic peoples who were important within the Roman empire in his time. Jordanes described Ermaneric, as the king of a single large Gothic empire until the late 4th-century, ruling over all Goths and many other peoples. In contrast, Ammianus Marcellinus, himself writing in the late 4th-century, described Ermanaric as the Greuthungi leader, implying that his kingdom was not as large as that described by Jordanes.

According to Ammianus, the defense against the Huns and Alans continued under a new king Vithimir, who also had Hunnic allies on his side. After he died, the defense was led by two generals Alatheus and Saphrax, while Videricus, Vithimir's son, was a boy. In the meantime, Athanaric, now described by Ammianus as leader of the Tervingi, first moved to the Greuthungi position at the Dniester to block the westward movement of the Huns but was defeated, and then moved his people into a more defensible position further west near the Carpathians.

In 376 a large part of the Tervingi were allowed to cross the Lower Danube entering the Roman Empire with weapons, under the command of Fritigern, who had split from Athanaric. As tensions rose, Alatheus and Saphrax also crossed with Greuthingi and their king Videricus, despite their requests for permission having been rejected. Athanaric, who was apparently with them before they crossed, moved instead to a mountainous and forested region called Caucalanda, forcing Sarmatians out of the area. Alans and Huns also crossed in 377. The displacement of the Goths into the Balkans peninsula led to the Gothic War of 376–382 during which the Greuthungi of Alatheus and Saphrax were allied with the Tervingi of Fritigern. Greuthungi cavalry contributed to a shocking Gothic victory over Roman forces at the Battle of Adrianople of 9 August 378. In 382 it is thought that there was a more lasting settlement agreement was made for the large number of Goths to settle peacefully in the Balkans, and contribute to the Roman military. Unfortunately, the details of this agreement are now unclear.

In 380, some of the Greuthungi under Alatheus and Saphrax appear to have separated from the main force of the Tervingi, invading the Diocese of Pannonia in the Northern Balkans, but were defeated by Emperor Gratian. The outcome of this invasion is unclear, it is possible that they were defeated and dispersed by Gratian, or that they reached a separate peace agreement and settled in Pannonia.

Several sources report more Greuthungi who were still outside of the empire in 386, under a leader from outside the Empire named Odotheus. He gathered large forces north of the Lower Danube, including peoples from far away. He attempted to cross the river, but he and his troops were massacred by a Roman general named Promotus.

A group of Greuthungi under Roman control were settled in Phrygia and rebelled in 399–400. They are referred in a poem by Claudian which describes the Ostrogoths and Greuthungi inhabiting that land together, and fighting for the Roman military, ready to be aroused by some small offense, and return to their natural ways. The poem associates this rebellious squadron (alae) in Phrygia with the Roman general of Gothic background, Tribigild. Claudian uses the term Ostrogoth once, and in other references to this same group he more often calls them Greuthungi or "Getic" (an older word, used for Goths generally in this period). Zosimus also mentioned Tribigild and the barbarian forces based in Phrygia, and their rebellion against the eunuch Eutropius the consul (died 399). Gainas, the aggrieved Gothic general sent to fight him, joined forces with him after the death of Eutropius. Zosimus believed that was conspiracy between the two Goths from the beginning.

In contrast, the Amal dynasty, around whom the later and better-known Othogothic kingdom formed, were in neither of these groups who entered the Roman Empire in the 4th century, because into the 5th century they were apparently Gothic leaders within Attila's Hunnic Empire.

== Archaeology ==
In time and geographical area, the Greutungi and their neighbours, the Thervingi, correspond to parts of the archaeological Chernyakhov culture.

=== Settlement pattern ===
Chernyakhov settlements cluster in open ground in river valleys. The houses include sunken-floored dwellings, surface dwellings, and stall-houses. The largest known settlement (Budesty) is 35 hectares.

=== Burial practices ===
Chernyakhov cemeteries include both cremation and inhumation burials in which the head is to the north. Some graves were left empty. Grave goods often include pottery, bone combs, and iron tools but almost never any weapons.

== Relationship with Ostrogoths ==
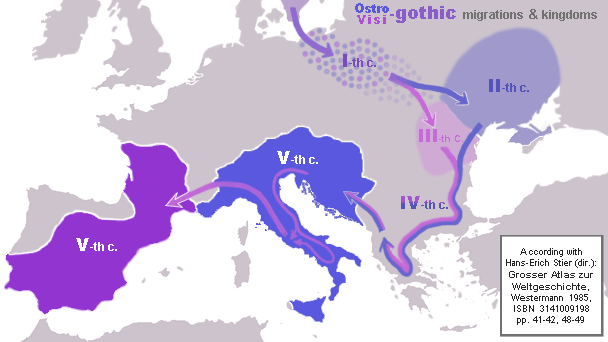
Map of the Gothic migrations and kingdoms

The Tervingi were first attested by 291, indicating that different Gothic peoples already had distinct identities and names by that time. The Greuthungi are first named by Ammianus Marcellinus, writing no earlier than 392 and perhaps later than 395. The earliest events where he describes the Grethungi were in the 360s. The Ostrogoths, are also first mentioned in a poem by Claudian which describes the Ostrogoths and Greutungi inhabiting the land of Phrygia.

Despite such records which seem to show the Ostrogoths and Greutungi as distinct, according to Herwig Wolfram, the primary sources either use the terminology of Tervingi/Greutungi or Vesi/Ostrogothi and never mix the pairs. When the names were used together, Wolfram argues that it is significant that the pairing was always preserved, as in Gruthungi, Austrogothi, Tervingi, Visi.

The nomenclature of Greuthungi and Tervingi fell out of use shortly after 400. In general, the terminology of a divided Gothic people disappeared gradually after it entered the Roman Empire. Wolfram believes that because the term Greuthungi was a geographical identifier the terminology dropped out of use after the Goths were displaced by the Hunnic invasions. In support of this, Wolfram cites Zosimus as referring to the group of "Scythians" north of the Danube who were called "Greuthungi" by the barbarians north of the Ister in 386. Wolfram concludes that these were in fact the Tervingi who had remained behind after the Hunnic conquest. according to this understanding, the Greuthungi and Ostrogothi were more or less the same people.

That the Greuthungi were the Ostrogothi is an idea derived from the medieval writer Jordanes. He identified the Ostrogothic kings from Theodoric the Great to Theodahad as the heirs of the Greuthungian king Ermanaric. Although Jordanes' explanation of the family succession is in direct conflict with the more reliable and contemporary information of Ammianus, there has been a long tradition of scholarly attempts to reconcile the two accounts, but these have not succeeded in creating any consensus. Peter Heather for example has written that the "Ostrogoths in the sense of the group led by Theoderic to Italy stand at the end of complex processes of fragmentation and unification involving a variety of groups – mostly but not solely Gothic it seems – and the better, more contemporary, evidence argues against the implication derived from Jordanes that Ostrogoths are Greuthungi by another name".

== People ==
- Ermanaric (c. 370s), King
- Vithimiris (c. 376), King
- Alatheus and Saphrax (fl. 376–387), chieftains

== See also ==
- Greuthungi Wall
- Thervingi
