= Auxentius of Durostorum =

Bishop

Auxentius
- Other name: Mercurinus

Ecclesiastical career
- Offices held: Bishop of Milan

Auxentius of Durostorum, also probably known as Mercurinus, was a bishop of Durostorum. An Arian, he was prominent in conflict with St Ambrose.

== Identity ==
Auxentius was the foster-son of Wulfila, the "apostle to the Goths". He is referred to by St Ambrose as "Mercurinus", but in an extravagant document written at the height of a bitter dispute with the Imperial court, apparently in order to accuse his rival with having changed his name from Mercurinus in order to curry favour with supporters of another Auxentius who had been Ambrose's predecessor; the robustness of this accusation is unknown.

== Biography ==
Auxentius was bishop of Durostorum on the lower Danube, but was expelled by an edict of Theodosius depriving Arian bishops in 383, and took refuge at Milan where he became embroiled in controversy with St Ambrose.

In Milan, seat of the Western Imperial court, Nicene and Arian controversy flared high. In 386, Auxentius challenged Ambrose to a public disputation, in which the judges were to be the court favourites of the Arian empress; he also demanded for the Arians the use of the Basilica Portiana. Ambrose's refusal to surrender this church brought about a siege of the edifice, in which Ambrose and a multitude of his faithful Milanese had shut themselves up. The empress eventually abandoned her favourite and made peace with Ambrose.

He wrote an account of the life and death of Ulfilas that the Arian bishop Maximinus included (383) in a work directed against St. Ambrose and the Synod of Aquileia, 381. This favourite of Empress Justina was the anti-bishop set up in Milan by the Arians on the occasion of the election of Ambrose.

The Letter of Auxentius (ca 400) was preserved in the margins of a manuscript of De fide of Ambrose. Along with the Creed of Ulfilas it is one of the chief witnesses to the credence of the Arian Christians and the politics of the Church at the time when Nicene Christianity continued to be debated at the highest levels of the Catholic Church.
