= Reiks =

Gothic title for a tribal ruler

Reiks (Gothic: 𐍂𐌴𐌹𐌺𐍃; pronunciation /ri:ks/; Latinized as rix) is a Gothic title for a tribal ruler, often translated as "king".

In the Gothic Bible, it translates to the Greek árchōn (ἄρχων). It is presumably translated as basiliskos (βασιλίσκος "petty king") in the Passio of Sabbas the Goth.

The Gothic Thervingi were divided into subdivisions of territory and people called kunja (singular kuni, cognate with English kin), led by a reiks. In times of a common threat, one of the reiks would be selected as a kindins, or head of the empire (translated as "judge", Latin iudex, Greek δικαστής).

Herwig Wolfram suggested the position was different from the Roman definition of a rex ("king") and is better described as that of a tribal chief (see Germanic king).

A reiks had a lower order of optimates or megistanes (μεγιστάνες, presumably translating mahteigs) beneath him on whom he could call on for support.

It also figures prominently as second element in Gothic names, Latinized and often anglicized as -ric, such as in Theoderic (Þiuda-reiks).

The use of the suffix extended into the Merovingian dynasty, with kings given names such as Childeric, and it survives in modern German and Scandinavian names such as Ulrich, Erik, Dietrich, Heinrich, Richard, Friedrich.

== See also ==
- Germanic king
- Reich
- King of the Visigoths
- King of the Ostrogoths
