= Sabbas the Goth =

Christian martyr and saint, died 372

Saint Sabbas the Goth
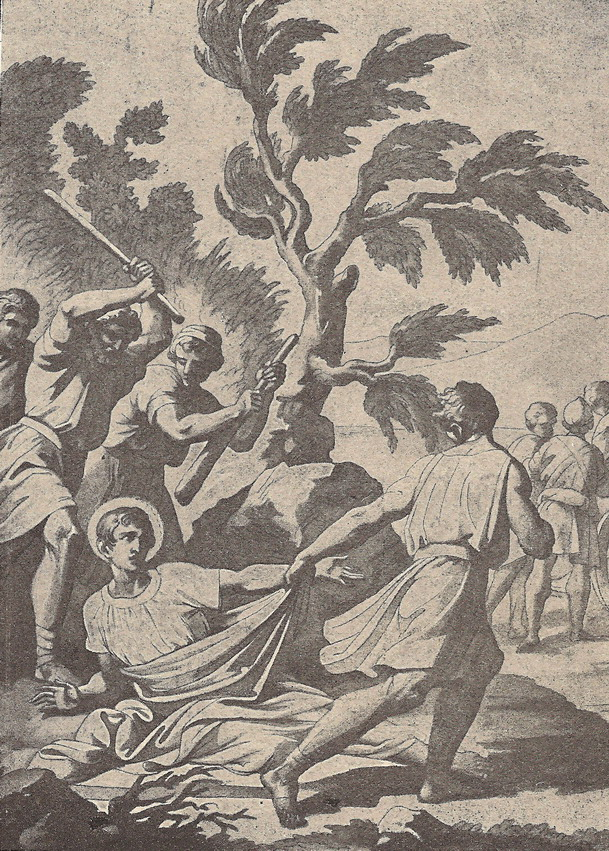
- Saint Sabbas's martyrdom
- Born: 334; Buzău river valley, Romania
- Died: 372; Buzău river valley, Romania
- Venerated in: Eastern Orthodox Church; Oriental Orthodox Church; Roman Catholic Church
- Feast: 12 April (Western Churches); 24 April (Eastern Orthodox Church)

Sabbas the Goth (Romanian: Sava Gotul, Greek: Σάββας ο Γότθος; died 12 April 372) was a Christian martyr venerated as a saint.

Born in eastern Romania, Sabbas became a Christian in his youth. Fearing that Christianity would undermine Gothic culture, King Athanaric began a persecution of Christians. Sabbas refused to eat meat that had been sacrificed to the Gothic gods. He was arrested along with Sansalas the priest, and drowned. Basil of Caesarea later obtained his relics. The Passio of Sabbas gives some insight into Gothic life and culture.

== Life and persecution ==
Sabbas (also Saba) was born in 334 in a village in the Buzău river valley and lived in what is now the Wallachia region in Romania and converted to Christianity as a youth. His hagiography states that he was a Goth by race and may have been a cantor or a reader to the religious community there.

In circa 369 the Tervingi king Athanaric began a persecution of the Christians in his territory. First, a Gothic nobleman began the suppression of Christianity in Sabbas' area. When his agents came to the village where Sabbas lived they forced the villagers to eat pagan sacrificial meat. According to the tale, non-Christian villagers wanting to help their Christian neighbours tricked the authorities by exchanging the sacrificial meat for meat that had not been sacrificed. However, Sabbas made a conspicuous show of rejecting the meat altogether. His fellow villagers exiled him but after a while, he was allowed to return.

Sometime after, the Gothic noble returned and asked if there were any Christians in the village. Sabbas stepped forward and proclaimed, "Let no-one swear an oath on my behalf. I am a Christian." Sabbas' neighbours then said that he was a poor man of no account. The leader dismissed him, saying, "This one can do us neither good nor harm."

In the year 372, Sabbas celebrated Easter with the priest Sansalas. Three days after Easter Atharid, the son of Athanaric's sub-king Rothesteus, arrived in the village to arrest Sansalas. Saba was dragged naked through thorn bushes, then racked, alongside the priest Sansalas, to a wagon wheel, and whipped. The next day he was offered pagan sacrificed meat again. He was, however, still steadfast, and suggested they tell Atharid to kill him. Sabbas also so angered one of Atharid's retinue by insulting the prince that he hurled a pestle as if it were a javelin at Sabbas so hard that those nearby were sure he was dead, but it left no mark.

== Martyrdom and translation of relics ==
The Gothic prince Atharid sentenced Sabbas to death, ordering him to be thrown in the river Musæus, a tributary of the Danube. As he went with the soldiers he praised God the whole way, denouncing the pagan and idolatrous ways of his captors. The soldiers, considering him a fool or insane, contemplated just letting him go, reasoning that the prince would never find out. Sabbas urged them to do their duty, proclaiming "Why do you waste time talking nonsense and not do what you were told to? For I see what you cannot see: over there on the other side, standing in glory, the saints who have come to receive me". At this the soldiers pushed him under the river with a branch against his neck and drowned him.

He was martyred during the reign of Valentinian and Valens, in the consulship of Modestus and Arintheus, i.e. 372. His remains were taken and hidden by the Christians until they could be sent for safe keeping to the Roman Empire. Here they were received by Bishop Ascholius of Thessalonica.

Basil of Caesarea requested that the military commander of Scythia Minor, Junius Soranus, send him the relics of saints and the Dacian priests sent the relics of Sabbas to him in Caesarea, Cappadocia, in 373 or 374 accompanied by a letter, the 'Epistle of the Church of God in Gothia to the Church of God located in Cappadocia and to all the Local Churches of the Holy Universal Church'. This letter was written in Greek, possibly by St Bretannio of Tomis.

== Significance ==
In response, Basil replied with two letters to Bishop Ascholius where he extolled the virtues of Sabbas, calling him an 'athlete of Christ' and a 'martyr for the Truth'.

Sabbas' feast day is on the date of his martyrdom, 12 April in the Roman Martyrology and 15 April in the Orthodox Church. The Orthodox Church commemorates him as "the holy, glorious, and right-victorious Great-martyr Sabbas."

The value of the Passion for historians lies in the unique insight it gives into Gothic village life and social structure as well as the information that can be inferred about Gothic government on all levels.

== See also ==
- Nicetas the Goth
- Gothic Christianity
- Saint Sabbas the Goth, patron saint archive
- Thervings i.e. Tervingi, the Gothic tribe Saba belonged to.

== Sources ==
- Butler, Alban, Rev., (1866). The Lives of the Fathers, Martyrs and Other Principal Saints: Compiled from Original Monuments and Authentic Records by the Rev. Alban Butler, in Twelve Volumes, James Duffy, Dublin. Online at bartleby.com (viewed 2012-06-26).
- Halsall, Guy, (2007). Barbarian Migrations and the Roman West, 376–568, Cambridge University Press, Cambridge.
- Heather, Peter, (1991). Goths and Romans, 332-489, Oxford University Press, Oxford.
- Heather, Peter and Matthews, John, (1991). Goths in the Fourth Century, Liverpool University Press, Liverpool, 102–113, Passion of St. Saba the Goth (in English), with commentary.
- Passio S. Sabae in H. Delehaye, 'Saints de Thrace et de Mesie', Analecta Bollandiana, xxxi, 1912, pp. 161–300, with a text of the relevant documents on pp. 209–21 (in Latin).
- Wolfram, Herwig, (1988). History of the Goths, trans T. J. Dunlap, University of California Press, Berkeley.
