= Germanic kingship =

Thesis on the role of kings among the Germanic tribes of the 4th–11th centuries

Germanic kingship is a thesis regarding the role of kings among the pre-Christianized Germanic tribes of the Migration period (c. 300–700 AD) and Early Middle Ages (c. 700–1000 AD). The thesis holds that the institution of feudal monarchy developed, through contact with the Roman Empire and the Christian Church, from an earlier custom of sacral and military kingship based on both birth status and consent from subjects.

The term barbarian kingdom is used in the context of those Germanic rulers who after 476 AD and during the 6th century ruled territories formerly part of the Western Roman Empire, especially the Barbarian kings of Italy. In the same context, Germanic law is also derisively termed leges barbarorum "barbarian law" etc.

The thesis of Germanic kingship appeared in the nineteenth century and was influential in the historiography of early medieval society, but has since come under criticism for drawing generalizations from limited evidence.

== Alleged characteristics ==
The Germanic king originally had three main functions:

- To serve as judge during the popular assemblies.
- To serve as a priest during the sacrifices.
- To serve as a military leader during wars.

The office was received hereditarily, but a new king required the consent of the people before assuming the throne. All sons of the king had the right to claim the throne, which often led to co-rulership (diarchy) where two brothers were elected kings at the same time. This evolved into the territories being considered the hereditary property of the kings, patrimonies, a system which fueled feudal wars, because the kings could claim ownership of lands beyond their de facto rule.

As a sort of pre-Christianization high priest, the king often claimed descent from some deity. In the Scandinavian nations, he administered pagan sacrifices (blóts) at important cult sites, such as the Temple at Uppsala. Refusal to administer the blóts could lead to the king losing power (see Haakon the Good and Anund Gårdske).

According to the testimony of Tacitus (Germania), some early Germanic peoples had an elective monarchy already in the 1st century.

In the election of kings they have regard to birth; in that of generals, to valor.

Germanic pre-Christianization society had three levels, the king, the nobility and the free men. Their respective political influence was negotiated at the thing. According to the testimony of Tacitus,

On affairs of smaller moment, the chiefs consult; on those of greater importance, the whole community; yet with this circumstance, that what is referred to the decision of the people, is first maturely discussed by the chiefs. [...] When they all think fit, they sit down armed. Silence is proclaimed by the priests, who have on this occasion a coercive power. Then the king, or chief, and such others as are conspicuous for age, birth, military renown, or eloquence, are heard; and gain attention rather from their ability to persuade, than their authority to command. If a proposal displease, the assembly reject it by an inarticulate murmur; if it prove agreeable, they clash their javelins.

Tacitus notes that as each tribe had its own customary law, the political power of the king could vary between nations. Thus, he states that the Gothones were ruled by a monarchy "somewhat more strict than that of the other German nations, yet not to a degree incompatible with liberty" while beyond the Gothones, the Rugii and Lemovii (tribes placed at the far end of Magna Germania, near the Baltic Sea) lived in "submission to regal authority".

== Later development ==
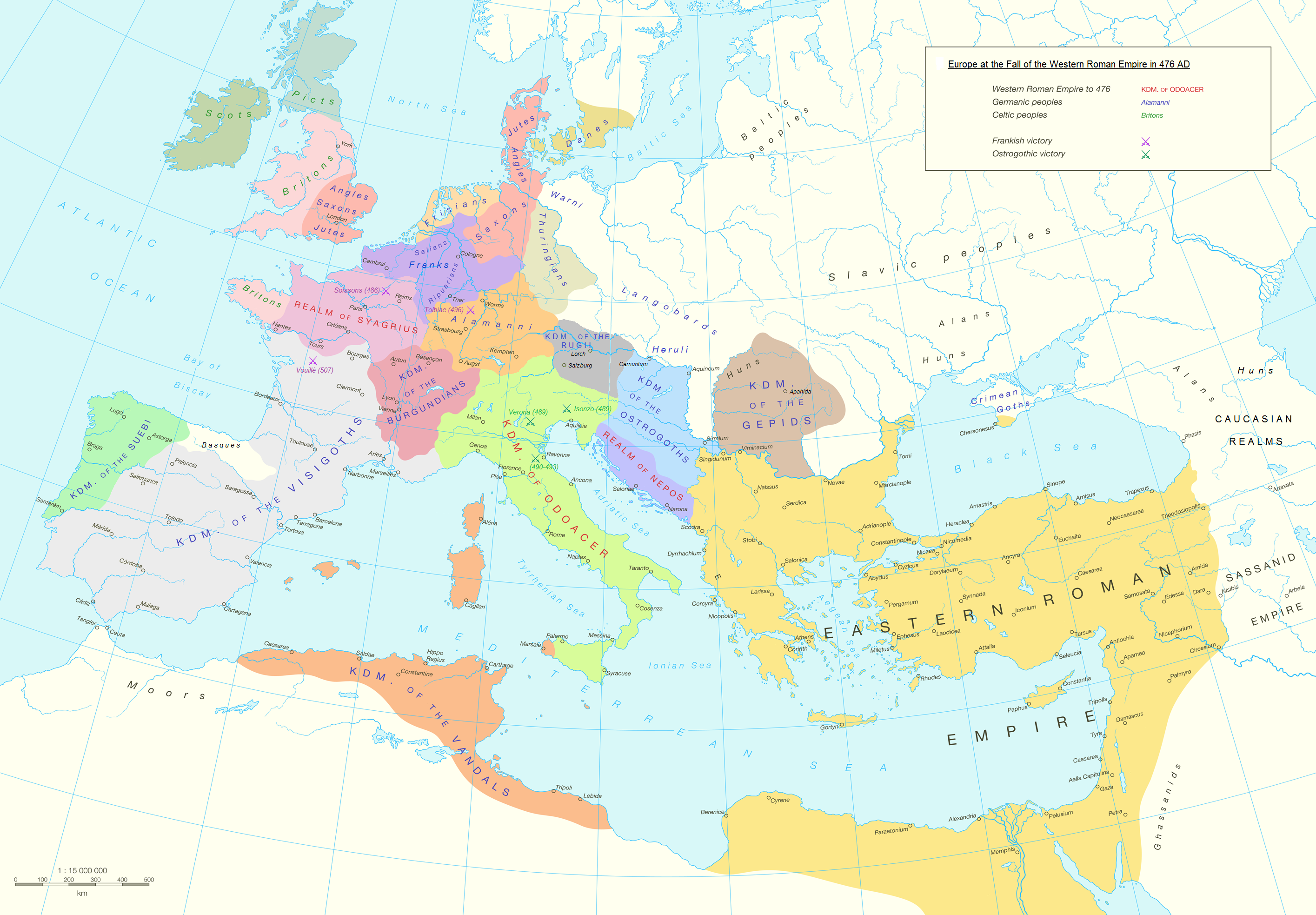
Europe at the fall of the Western Roman Empire in 476

With the decline of the Roman Empire, many of its provinces came under the rule of Germanic kings: Hispania to the Visigoths, Italia to the Ostrogoths, Gallia to the Franks, Britannia to the Anglo-Saxons, and Africa to the Vandals. These nations had by then been in contact with Rome for a century or more and had adopted many Roman customs. They were also undergoing Christianisation and pre-Christianization practice was slowly being replaced.

The Frankish state under the Merovingian dynasty had many of the characteristics of Germanic monarchy under heavy influence from secular and ecclesiastic Rome. Its kings, through their division of the territory, treated it not as a state independent of themselves, but as their patrimony, land won by conquest (theirs and their forefathers'). The king was primarily a war leader and a judge. There are many theories to explain the collapse of Merovingian power, most of which blame the inability of later Merovingians in war as an important factor. The commonly cited occasion of Sigebert III sobbing in his saddle after a defeat (the king was then only ten years old) highlights the importance of victory in battle for a king who is chiefly a warrior.

The principle of election, which determined Germanic succession, was abandoned in those states under the heaviest influence from the papacy, such as Merovingian Gaul, where hereditary succession and the divine right of the reigning dynasty was recognised. In Anglo-Saxon Britain, the principle survived until the Norman Conquest removed it. Anglo-Saxon kings were elected by the witena gemót. Finally, the principle survived in some form or other for centuries after the demise of the last Germanic monarchies. The civil wars of medieval Scandinavia and the electorate of the Holy Roman Empire are part of its legacy.

== See also ==
- Germanic law
- Kingship in early Irish law
- Merovingians
- Agilolfings
- Anglo-Saxon royal genealogies (list)
- Kings of Burgundy
- Ynglings (legendary kings of Sweden)
- Wuffingas
- Wulfings
- Hundings
- Æsir

== Sources ==
- Chaney, William A. (1970). The Cult of Kingship in Anglo-Saxon England: The Transition from Paganism to Christianity. Manchester: Manchester University Press.
- Joseph H. Lynch, Christianizing Kinship: Ritual Sponsorship in Anglo-Saxon England, Cornell University Press (1998), ISBN 0-8014-3527-7.
- Painter, Sidney. A History of the Middle Ages 284–1500. New York, 1953.
