= Athanaric =

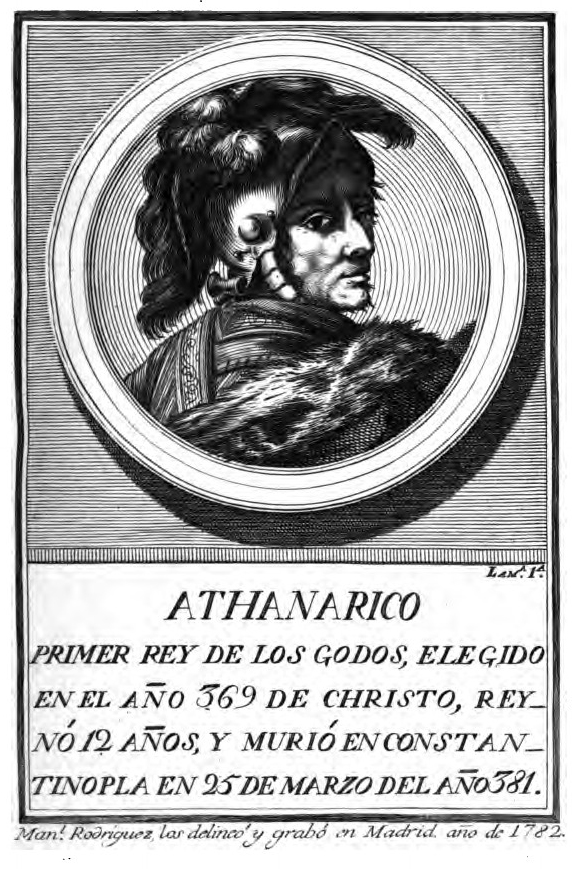
- Imaginary 1782 portrayal of Athanaric

King of the Thervingi
- Reign: 369–381
- Predecessor: Aoric
- Successor: Alaric I
- Died: 381; Constantinople, Roman Empire
- House: Balti dynasty
- Father: Aoric
- Religion: Gothic paganism

Athanaric or Atanaric (Latin: Athanaricus; died 381) was king of several branches of the Thervingian Goths (Latin: Thervingi) for at least two decades in the 4th century. Throughout his reign, Athanaric was faced with invasions by the Roman Empire, the Huns and a civil war with Christian rebels. He is considered the first king of the Visigoths, who later settled in Iberia, where they founded the Visigothic Kingdom.

== Life ==
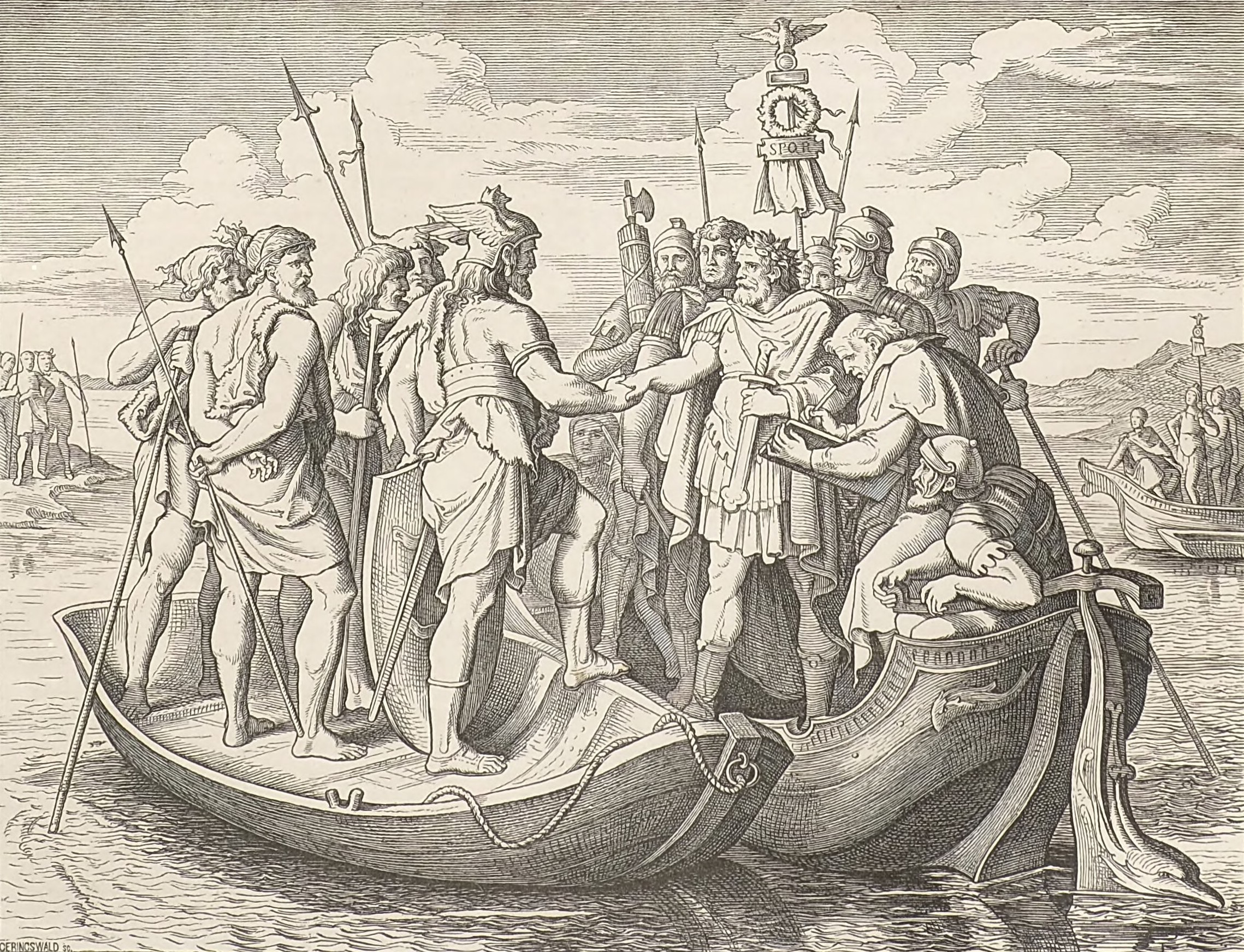
Athanaric and Valens on the Danube, Eduard Bendemann, 1860

Athanaric made his first appearance in recorded history in 369, when he engaged in battle with the Roman emperor Valens and ultimately negotiated a favorable peace for his people. During his reign, many Thervingi had converted to Arian Christianity, which Athanaric vehemently opposed, fearing that Christianity would destroy Gothic culture. According to the report of Sozomen, more than 300 Christians were killed in Athanaric's persecution during the 370s.

Fritigern, Athanaric's rival, was an Arian and had the favor of Valens, who shared his religious beliefs. In the early 370s, Athanaric successively fought Fritigern in a civil war. Along with his generals Muderic and Lagarimanus, Athanaric was later defeated by the invading Huns. Temporarily fleeing to Caucaland in the Carpathians, Athanaric was received by Theodosius I in Constantinople in 381, where he signed a treaty of friendship with the Roman Empire.

Socrates Scholasticus, Sozomen, and Zosimus refer to conflicts between Fritigern and Athanaric. Ammianus Marcellinus and Philostorgius do not record such conflicts.

According to Socrates, Fritigern and Athanaric were rival leaders of the Thervingian Goths. As this rivalry grew into warfare, Athanaric gained the advantage, and Fritigern asked for Roman aid. Emperor Valens and the Thracian field army intervened, Valens and Fritigern defeated Athanaric, and Fritigern converted to Christianity, following the same teachings as Valens followed. Sozomen follows Socrates' account.

According to Zosimus, Athanaric was king of the Goths. Sometime after their victory at Adrianople, and after the accession of Theodosius, Fritigern, Alatheus and Saphrax moved north of the Danube and defeated Athanaric, before returning south of the Danube.

In 376, Valens permitted Fritigern's people to cross the Danube and settle on Roman soil to avoid the Huns, who had recently conquered the Greuthungi and were now pressing the Thervingi then living in Dacia.

In 381, Athanaric unexpectedly came to Constantinople. According to Jordanes, he negotiated a peace with the new emperor Theodosius, that made some Thervingi foederati, or official allies of Rome, allowed to settle on Roman soil as a state within a state. Orosius (Historiae adversum paganos 7, 34) and Zosimus (New History 4, 34, 3-5) affirm this, but another source, Ammianus Marcellinus (Res gestae 27, 5, 10) narrates an entirely different story. According to him, Athanaric was banished by his fellow tribesmen and forced to seek asylum in Roman territory. Cf. Themistius (oratio 15, 190-1) likewise describes Athanaric as a supplicant and a refugee. Cassiodorus says that Athanaric's visit occurred in the consulate of Antonius and Siagrius, or 382 A.D

A peace treaty with the Thervingi (or Visigoths), who still fought the Romans in Thrace, was concluded in 382 and it lasted until the death of Theodosius of Constantinople, in 395.

== See also ==
- Athanaric's Wall

Athanaric Died: 381
Regnal titles
First	King of the Visigoths; 371–381	Vacant Title next held by Alaric I
