= Thervingi =

Gothic tribe

The Thervingi, Tervingi, or Teruingi (sometimes pluralised Tervings or Thervings) were a Gothic people of the plains north of the Lower Danube and west of the Dniester River in the 3rd and the 4th centuries.

They had close contacts with the Greuthungi, another Gothic people from east of the Dniester, and they also had significant interactions with the Roman Empire. They were one of the main components of the large movement of Goths and other peoples over the Danube in 376, and they are seen as one of the most important ancestral groups of the Visigoths.

== Etymology ==
According to a proposal made by Moritz Schönfeld in 1911, and still widely cited, the name Tervingi was probably related to the Gothic word "triu", equivalent to English "tree", and thus means "forest people". Herwig Wolfram agrees with the older position of Franz Altheim that such geographical names were used to distinguish Gothic peoples living north of the Black Sea both before and after Gothic settlement there, and that the Thervingi sometimes had forest-related personal names such as Vidigoia, Veduco and Vidimir, the first part of whose names he believes to be cognate with English "wood". In contrast, the name of the other major Gothic group known from this period, the Greuthungi, may mean "steppe-people", with an etymology connected to a word for sand or gravel. Both names are only found from the 3rd century until the late 4th or early 5th.

Some scholars have proposed that the name "Thervingi" may have pre-Pontic, Scandinavian, origins. Wolfram cites the example of J. Svennung who believed that the Tervingi were Scandinavian "ox people".

== History ==
=== Third century ===
The Thervingi were possibly among the Goths who invaded the Roman Empire in the year 268. This invasion overran the Roman provinces of Pannonia and Illyricum and even threatened Italia itself. However, the Goths were defeated in battle that summer near the modern Italian-Slovenian border and then routed in the Battle of Naissus that September. Over the next three years they were driven back over the Danube River in a series of campaigns by the emperors Claudius II Gothicus and Aurelian.

In the problematic Historia Augusta article for Emperor Claudius Gothicus (reigned 268-270), the following list of "Scythian" peoples is given who had been conquered by the emperor when he earned his title "Gothicus": "peuci trutungi austorgoti uirtingi sigy pedes celtae etiam eruli". These words are traditionally edited by modern editors to include well-known peoples: "Peuci, Grutungi, Austrogoti, Tervingi, Visi, Gipedes, Celtae etiam et Eruli". This was therefore sometimes argued to be the first record of the Tervingi. However, apart from the reconstructions needed, historians today believe this document was made around 400, and thus 100 years later.

The Thervingi, along with several other Gothic groups they are distinguished from, are first mentioned in a panegyric to the emperor Maximian (285–305), delivered in or shortly after 291 (perhaps delivered at Trier on 20 April 292). It was traditionally ascribed to Claudius Mamertinus.

This panegyric can be interpreted in different ways. After mentioning Moorish peoples fighting each other, it turns to Europe where two different conflicts are described in a way which makes it unclear which conflict the Tervingi were involved in: "The Goths utterly destroy the Burgundians, and again the Alamanni wear arms for the conquered, and the Tervingi too, another group of Goths, with the help of a band of Taifali join battle with the Vandals and Gepids". The passage is normally interpreted as explaining to the reader that the Tervingi were a type of Goth, and involved in the second of the two conflicts, fighting against Vandals and Gepids.

Another almost certainly third century record of the Tervingi is in the Breviarium of Eutropius from 369. He wrote that the province of Dacia now (nunc) contained Taifali, Vicotali, and Tervingi. However, once again the texts which have survived have major variants: Terbingi, Tervulgi, Terviginti and Τερβίται (Tervitai). This would place the Tervingi near the Carpathians, north of the Danube, which is consistent with what is known of the likely positions of the Taifali, Gepids and Vandals mentioned in the panegyric.

=== Fourth century ===
According to Jordanes, who does not mention the Tervingi, the Gothic ruler Ariaric was forced to sign a treaty with Constantine the Great in 332 after his son Constantine II decisively defeated the Goths. After that time, substantial numbers of valuable Roman gold medallions were distributed in Gothic territories from Netherlands to Ukraine, and have been discovered by archaeologists. They demonstrate the Roman influence among the Goths.

In 367, the Roman Emperor Valens attacked the Thervingi north of the Danube river in retribution for their having supported the usurper Procopius, who had died in 366. However, he was unable to hit them directly, because apparently the bulk of the Goths retreated to the Montes Serrorum (which is probably the south Carpathians). Ammianus Marcellinus says that Valens could not find anyone to fight with (nullum inveniret quem superare poterat vel terrere) and even implies that all of them fled, horror-struck, to the mountains (omnes formidine perciti... montes petivere Serrorum). In the following year, the flooding of the Danube prevented the Romans from crossing the river.

In 369, Valens finally penetrated deep into the Gothic territory, winning a series of skirmishes with Greuthungi, who are mentioned here for the first time in a classical record. Athanaric who was, in this passage, described by Ammianus as their most powerful judge "iudicem potentissimum" (implying he was a leader of the Greuthingi) was compelled to flee, and then make a peace agreement in the middle of the Danube, promising to never set foot on Roman soil. In later parts of his text however, Ammianus describes Athanaric as a judge (iudex) of the Tervingi, who was attacked by Greuthungi who had joined the Huns.

=== Gothic War (376–382) ===
The Thervingi remained in western Scythia (probably modern Moldavia and Wallachia) until 376, when one of their leaders, Fritigern, appealed to the Roman emperor Valens to be allowed to settle with his people on the south bank of the Danube. The vision that there, they hoped to find refuge from the Huns, is today contested by historians. It is more likely that they settled because of peace negotiations following the first Gothic War. Valens permitted this. However, a famine broke out and Rome was unwilling to supply them with the food they were promised nor the land; open revolt ensued leading to 6 years of plundering and destruction throughout the Balkans, the death of a Roman Emperor and the destruction of an entire Roman army. The Battle of Adrianople in 378 was the decisive moment of the war. The Roman forces were slaughtered; the Emperor Valens was killed during the fighting, shocking the Roman world and eventually forcing the Romans to negotiate with and settle the Barbarians on Roman land, a new trend with far reaching consequences for the eventual fall of the Western Roman Empire.

== Archaeology ==
In time and geographical area, the Thervingi and their neighbors the Greuthungi correspond to the archaeological Sîntana de Mureş-Chernyakhov Culture.

=== Settlement pattern ===
Chernyakhov settlements cluster in open ground in river valleys. The houses include sunken-floored dwellings, surface dwellings, and stall-houses. The largest known settlement (Budesty) is 35 hectares. Most settlements are open and unfortified; some forts are also known.

=== Burial practices ===
Sîntana de Mureş cemeteries are better known than Sîntana de Mureş settlements.

Sîntana de Mureş cemeteries show the same basic characteristics as other Chernyakhov cemeteries. These include both cremation and inhumation burials; among the latter the head is to the north. Some graves were left empty. Grave goods often include pottery, bone combs, and iron tools, but almost never any weapons.

== Religion ==
The original religion of the Thervingi is Wodinism, though Saba or Sava's martyrology and Wulfila's Bible translation may provide clues. Some months and days were holy, and cult observance and ceremonies were compulsory with their piety. Roman prisoners brought Christianity to the Thervingi. This spread fast enough that several Therving kings and their supporters persecuted the Christian Thervingi, as attested by the story of Wereka and Batwin, and many of whom fled to Moesia in the Roman Empire. Wulfila translated the Bible into Gothic during this exile.

Settled in Dacia, the Thervingi adopted Arianism, at the time in power in the Eastern Empire, a branch of Christianity that believed that Jesus was not an aspect of God in the Trinity, but a powerful, created being. This belief was in opposition to the tenets of Catholicism, which achieved a religious monopoly in the late 4th and 5th century.

== Language ==
As a branch of the Goths, the Thervinigi spoke Thervinigi dialect of Gothic, an extinct East Germanic language.

== Relationship with the Visigoths ==
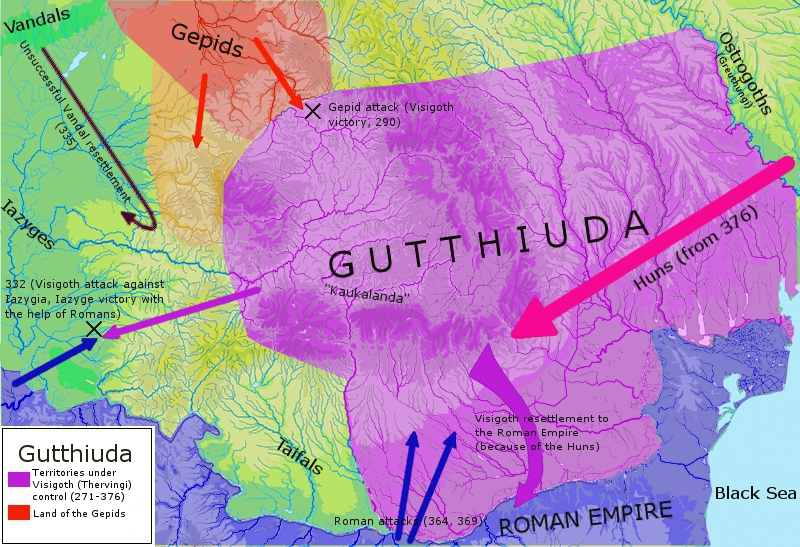
Gutthiuda, the country of Visigoths (Thervingi)

Based upon the medieval writer Jordanes who described the Visigothic kings from Alaric I to Alaric II as the heirs of the 4th-century Thervingian "judge" (iudex) Athanaric, Visigoths have traditionally been treated as successors of the Thervingi.

In defense of this equation, Herwig Wolfram, interprets the Notitia Dignitatum to equate the Vesi with the Thervingi in the period 388–391. According to Herwig Wolfram, the primary sources either use the terminology of Thervingi/Greuthungi or Vesi/Ostrogothi and never mix the pairs, except in cases where there was a mistake.

On the other hand, another recent interpretation of the Notitia is that the two names, Vesi and Tervingi, are found in different places in the list, "a clear indication that we are dealing with two different army units, which must also presumably mean that they are, after all, perceived as two different peoples". Peter Heather has written that Wolfram's position is "entirely arguable, but so is the opposite".

Wolfram believes that the terms Thervingi and Greuthungi were older geographical identifiers used by each tribe to describe the other – exonyms for the traditional territory. The terminology therefore dropped out of use after the Goths were displaced by the Hunnic invasions. In contrast he proposes that the terms "Vesi" and "Ostrogothi" were used as endonyms by the peoples to boastfully describe themselves. Thus, the Thervingi would have called themselves Vesi.

== Leaders ==
=== Pagan kings ===
- Athanaric (369–381)
- Rothesteus (chieftain)
- Eriulf (chieftain, died 391)

=== Rebel leaders ===
- Fritigern (c. 376 – c. 380)
