= Othala (disambiguation) =

*Ōþala (ᛟ) is a rune in the Elder Futhark and Anglo-Saxon Futhorc writing systems.

Othala may also refer to:

- Odal (SS rune), or Othala, a Nazi symbol
- Othala, a fictional planet in Stargate SG-1
