= Ideographic rune =

Rune as an ideogram

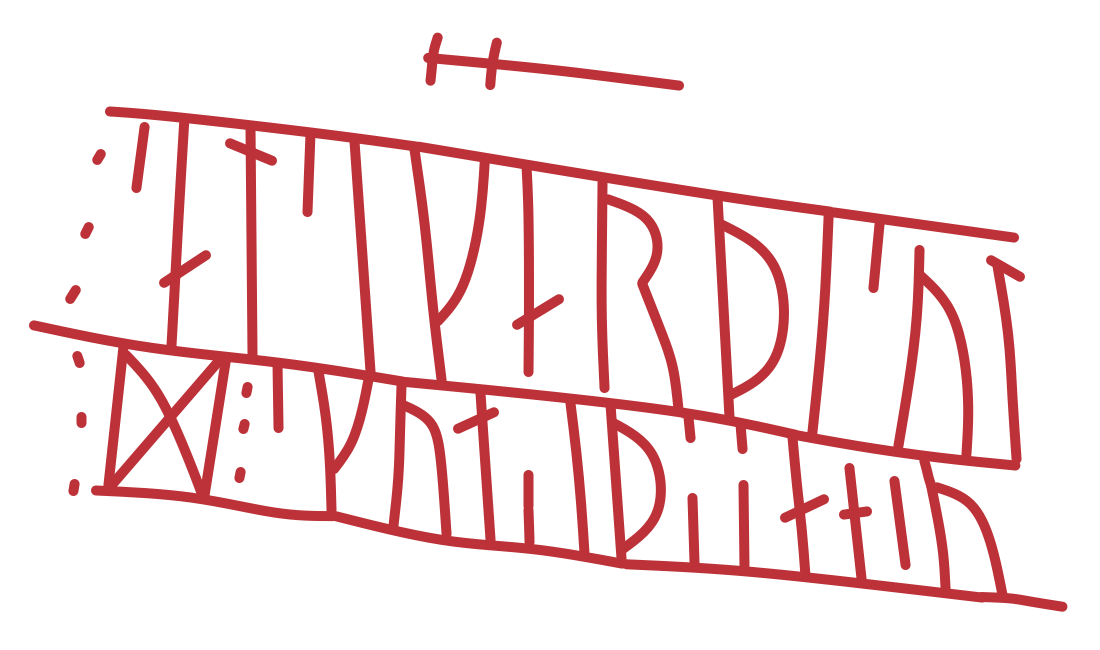
Östergötland Runic Inscription 43 with an elder ideographic rune: ᛞ (*dagʀ, 'day') for the writer's name: ⋮ ᛌᛅᛚᛌᛁ ᚴᛅᚱᚦᛁ ᛌᚢᛚ / ⋮ ᛞ ⋮ ᛌᚴᚢᛐᛧ ᛁ ᚦ¦¦ᛅᚼᛁᚢ "Solse made the sun / [Day] hewed this into the cliff"

Ideographic runes (German: Begriffsrunen, Swedish: begreppsrunor, 'term/notion runes') (Note: The German/Swedish prefix Begriff/begrepp, in this sense, can be summorized as: a word, phrase or name for a concept (an understanding, an idea), especially a word carrying a concept; as in: runes carrying a concept rather than a sound, i.e., ideographic runes.) are runes used as ideographs instead of regular letters, that is, instead of representing their phoneme or syllable, they represent their name as a word or term. Such instances are sometimes referred to by way of the modern German loanword Begriffsrunen (singular Begriffsrune), but the descriptive term "ideographic runes" is also used.

Ideographic runes appear to have mainly been used for saving space, but they were also mainly used without inflection. Some potential inscriptions might have used such cryptically. The criteria for the use of ideographic runes and the frequency of their use by ancient rune-writers remains controversial. The topic of has produced much discussion among runologists. Runologist Klaus Düwel has proposed two criteria for the identification of ideographic runes: A graphic argument and a semantic argument.

== Roman Iron Age (c. 1–350 AD) ==
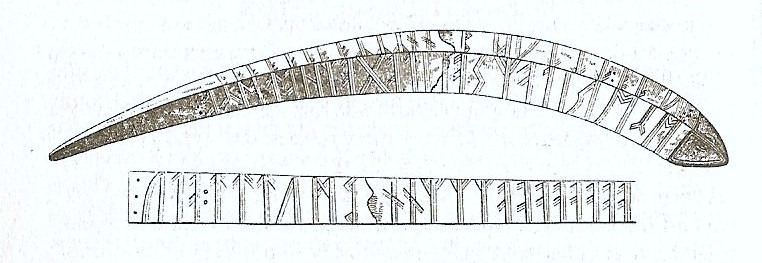
The Lindholm amulet as drawn by Stephens in 1884

One of the earliest potential ideographic rune finds stem from the Roman Iron Age in Nordic archeology. On the Elder Futhark inscription on the Lindholm amulet, dated to between the 2nd to 4th centuries, several runes repeat in a sentence to form an unknown meaning. Various scholars have proposed that these runes represent repeated ideographic runes.

== Migration Period (c. 300–550) ==
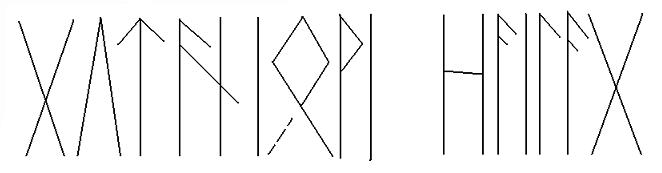
Inscription on the Ring of Pietroassa, with the seventh glyph reconstructed

The Ring of Pietroassa, part of the Pietroasele Treasure found in southern Romania, dated to between 250 and 400, features an Elder Futhark inscription in the Gothic language (an East Germanic language). This object was cut by thieves, damaging one of the runes. The identity of this rune was debated by scholars until a photograph of it was republished that, according to runologist Bernard Mees, clearly indicates it to have been the rune ᛟ (*Ōþala). Using it as an ideographic rune gives something akin to the following:

ᚷᚢᛏᚨᚾᛁ ᛟ ᚹᛁ ᚺᚨᛁᛚᚨᚷ

gutanī ō[þal] wī[h] hailag (Gothic)

The translation, however, is still up for debate.

== Vendel Period (c. 550–800) ==
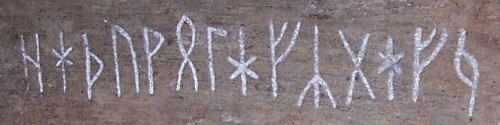
Part of the Elder Futhark inscription on the Stentoften Runestone in Blekinge, Sweden, assumed to feature an Elder j-rune ᛃ (Proto Norse: jāra, 'yearly harvest') as an ideographic rune

From the Vendel Period, the Stentoften Runestone in Blekinge, Sweden, is known to feature an ideographic rune. It has a segment which reads ᚺᚼᚦᚢᚹᛟᛚᚼᚠᛦᚷᚼᚠᛃ (haþuwolafʀgafj), which is thought to be divided as Haþuwolafʀ gaf j ("Heathwolf gave j"). The j-rune was named something akin to jāra in Proto Norse (Haþuwolafʀ gaf j[āra]), which is the same root word as 'year', but at the time rather used in the sense of 'yearly harvest' (compare the Swedish descendants: år = 'year', äring = "yearly growth/harvest"). The preceding text, not covered here, is assumed to mention working animals, thus, the text says something akin to "(with working animals) Heathwolf brought [yearly harvest]".

ᚺᚼᚦᚢᚹᛟᛚᚼᚠᛦ ᚷᚼᚠ ᛃ

Haþuwolafʀ gaf j[āra] (Proto Norse)
Hådulf gav [äring] (Modern Swedish)
Heathwolf brought [yearly harvest].

== Viking Age (c. 800–1100) ==
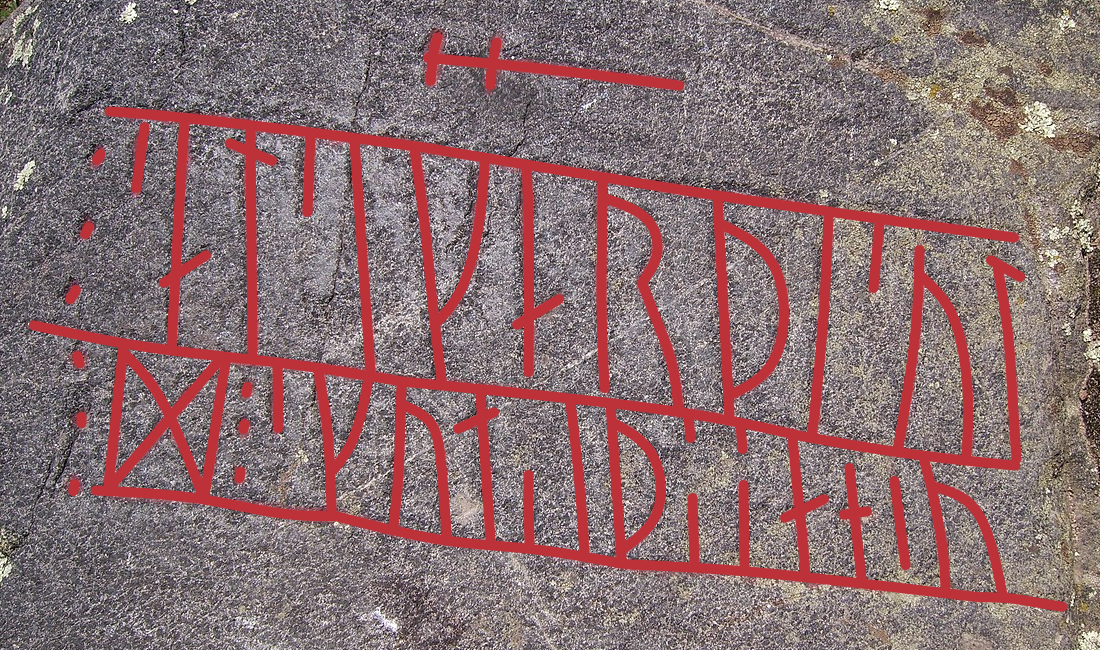
The Younger Futhark inscription Ög43, with the Elder Futhark rune ᛞ (early Old Norse: *dagʀ, 'day') used as an ideographic rune for the writer’s name

From the early Viking Age, the Younger Futhark inscription Ög43, from Östergötland, Sweden, features a unique case of an ideographic rune, namely an Elder Futhark d-rune ᛞ (early Old Norse: *dagʀ), used to represent the carvers name. The inscription is thought to have been made around the 9th century, and therefore shows that the elder runes survived in folk memory, despite such being out of use since the late 8th century.

⋮ ᛌᛅᛚᛌᛁ ᚴᛅᚱᚦᛁ ᛌᚢᛚ → ⋮ ᛞ ⋮ ᛌᚴᚢᛐᛧ ᛁ ᚦ¦¦ᛅᚼᛁᚢ

Salsi karþi sul → [Dagʀ] skutʀ i þ--a hiu
Solse gjorde sol → [Dager] skate i d[ett]a högg (Modern Swedish)
Solse made the sun (decoration on the stone) → [Dager] hewed this into the cliff

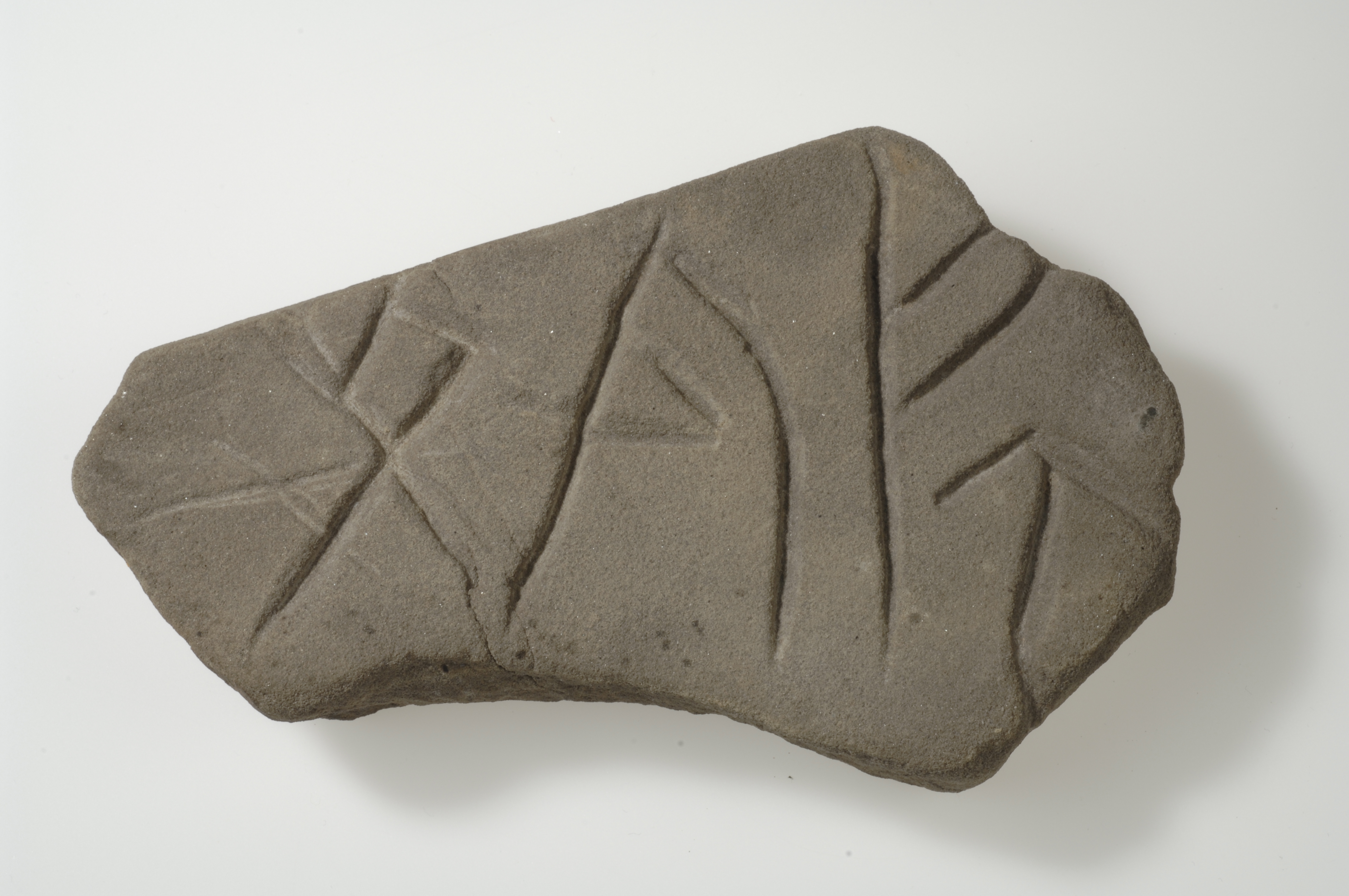
Whetstone (id: U Fv1913;276), with the Elder Futhark rune ᛟ (Old Norse: ōþal, '*property') used as an ideographic rune in what appears to be an anti-theft spell

Another case of Viking Age ideographic rune use, once again using an elder rune archaically, is the inscription U Fv1913;276, found at Birka, Uppland, Sweden. It consists of a whetstone, and features the Elder o-rune ᛟ alongside an, otherwise, Younger runic inscription (dated through place of discovery). The rune in question has the name ēþel/œ̄þel (= œ) in Old English, which comparatively corresponds to Old Norse ōþal, which roughly means "property". (Note: Related to Old English: æthel, Old Norse: aðal, "nobility")

ᛟᚦᚢᚠᛏ

[ōþal]-þȳft
[*property] theft/thieving

== High Middle Ages (c. 1100–1300) ==
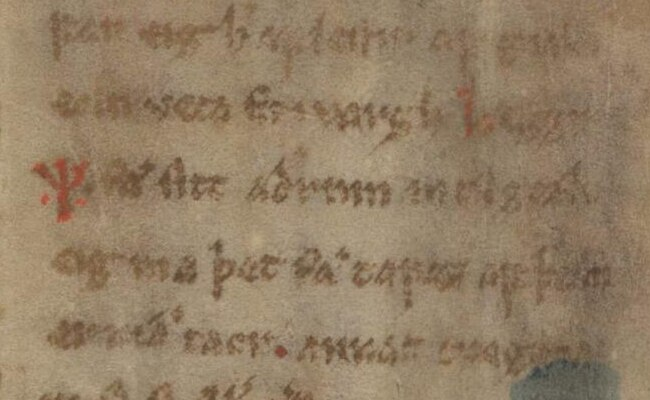
Red "man-rune" ᛘ in the 13th century Swedish Elder Westrogothic Law (manuscript KB B 193).

During the later Viking Age and Early Nordic Medieval Period (the European High Middle Ages), ideographic runes also appear in texts written using Latin script. Early Norse examples include: the Icelandic poem Hávamál in Codex Regius, and the Swedish law fragment: Okvädingamål (Old Swedish: Heþnalagh, "heathen law"), both written around the 11th century, and featuring the Younger Futhark rune ᛘ (Old Norse: maþr, 'man') to save space. Use of ideographic runes in latin script texts continued into the High Middle Ages. Like the earlier Swedish heathen law fragment, the later provincial Westrogothic law from the 13th century also use the m-rune ᛘ for 'man'.

The Swedish heathen law, for example, begins with:

Givr ᛘ oquæþins orð manni · þu ær æi mans maki oc eig ᛘ i brysti · Ek ær ᛘ sum þv (Old Swedish)
Giver [man] okvädningsord till annan: Du är ej mans make och ej [man] i bröstet. → Jag är [man] som du. (Modern Swedish)
Gives [man] insult to another: You are not man's equal nor [man] in the chest. → I am [man] like you.

The rune is avoided where the word 'man' is used in the inflected form.

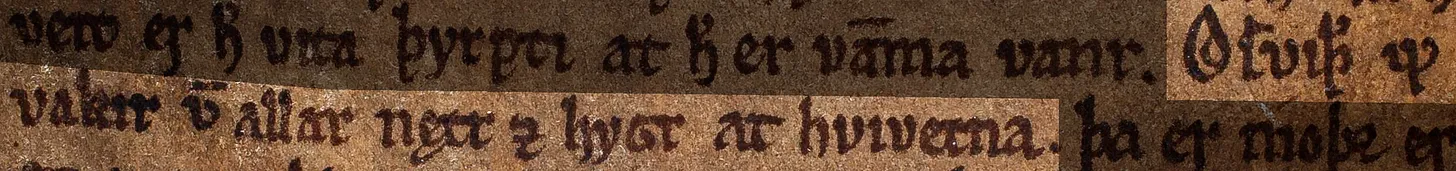
Example of ideographic rune-usage in Codex Regius, featuring a younger m-rune ᛘ (maðr, "man"); see top right

An example from Codex Regius, fol. 3v, reads:

Ó·sviðr ᛘ vakir um allar nę́tr, ok hyggr at hví-vetna
the unwise [man] is awake every night, and thinks about anything

Ideographic runes also appear in Anglo-Saxon texts, then as Anglo-Saxon runes; for example, in manuscripts such as the Nowell Codex (Beowulf) and The Exeter Book, the rune ᛗ (mann, "man") and ᛟ (éðel, "ancestral turf") was sometimes used ideographically.

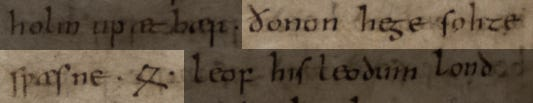
Example of ideographic rune-usage in the Nowell Codex, featuring an Anglo-Saxon ø-rune ᛟ (éðel, "ancestral turf")

An example from the Nowell Codex reads:

þǫnǫn hé ge·sóhte · swę́sne ᛟ
from there he sought out his beloved [homeland]

Runologist Thomas Birkett summarized the following about Viking Age ideographic instances as follows:

The maðr rune is found regularly in Icelandic manuscripts, the fé rune somewhat less frequently, whilst in Anglo-Saxon manuscripts the runes mon, dæg, wynn and eþel are all used on occasion. These are some of the most functional of the rune names, occurring relatively often in written language, unlike the elusive peorð, for example, which would be of little or no use as an abbreviation because of its rarity. The practicality of using an abbreviation for a familiar noun such as 'man' is demonstrated clearly in the Old Norse poem Hávamál, where the maðr rune is used a total of forty-five times, saving a significant amount of space and effort (Codex Regius: 5–14)

== Late Middle Ages (c. 1300–1500) ==
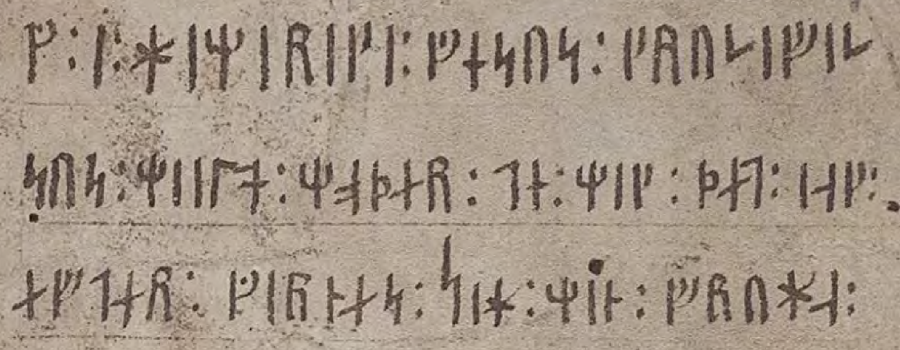
Extracted segment from Fragmentum Runico-Papisticum were the g-rune ᚵ is used as an ideograph for 'God'

In Fragmentum Runico-Papisticum (Swedish: Mariaklagan, 'Mary-lament'), written in the 14th–15th century, in either Denmark or Scania (then part of Denmark), a unique ideographic rune is used: a medieval g-rune ᚵ, otherwise known as "stung kaun" (compare Old Swedish: stungen kaghen, or geir/gir, of many variants), as an ideograph for 'God'. Whether this represents some conventional period use is unknown. In contemporary Sweden, runes carried many regional names and variations, thus a name like 'God' for the g-rune is not unrealistic, despite the text being in Old Danish or Old Scanian.

ᚵ ᛬ ᛁ ᛬ ᚼᛁᛘᛁᚱᛁᚴᛁ ᛬ ᚵᚽᛋᚢᛋ ᛬ ᚴᚱᚢᛎᛁᚠᛁᛎᛋᚢᛋ ᛬ ᛘᛁᛁᛚᛑ ᛬ ᛘᚮᚦᛅᚱ᛬ᛐᚽ ᛬ ᛘᛁᚴ ᛬ ᚦᛅᛐ ᛬ ᛁᛆᚴ ᛬ ᛅᚠᛐᛅᚱ ᛬ ᚵᛁᚱᚿᛅᛋ ᛬

[Guþ] i himiriki Gesus krucificsus miild moþær te mig þæt iak æftær girnæs. (Old Danish)
[Gud] i himmelriket Jesus krucifixus mild moder te mig det jag efter girnas. (Modern Swedish)
[God] in heaven, Jesus Crucifixus, mild mother, give me that I long for.

The Greenlandic runic inscription GR 43 (14th century) is a cryptic inscription in Runic Latin, which uses both a Q-rune (mirrored ᚴ), and a Z-rune (a stung short-twig S ᛍ: Hanging Sun), and what appears to be an ideographic rune: ᚧ (Ð, Stung Thurs), but with double stings. The Norse name for the unstung rune is Thurs, meaning "evil supernatural being", like Jötunn, but the stung variant, especially this unique double stung one, has no recorded orthodox name, thus its use here is unclear.

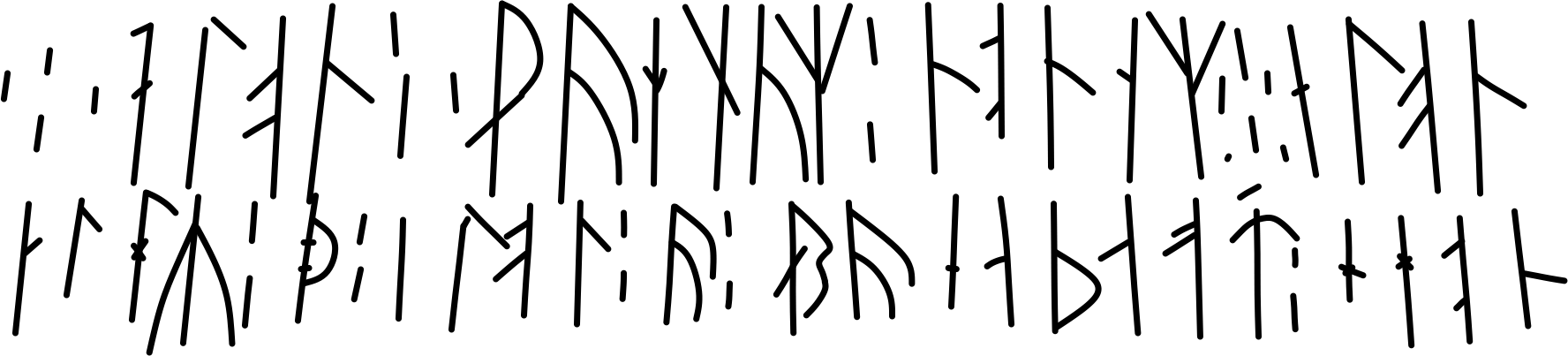

᛫⋮᛫ ᚽᛚᚮᚿ ᛬ ᛅᛚᚱᚽᛩᚿᚢᛘ ᛬ ᚿᚮᚿᚽᛘ :⋮: ᚽᛚᚮᚿ
ᚽᛚᛛᛦ ᛬ ᛬ᚦ ᛬ ᛁᛚᚮᚿ ᛬ ᚱ ᛬ ᛅᛒᚱᛍᛆbᛆᚮᛏ ᛬ ᛍᚽᚮᚿ
+ elon æ͡lreq͡num nonem : elon
elły Ð ilon R æ͡brzabaot zion

== Sources ==
- Düwel, Klaus (2004). "Runic". In Read, Malcolm; Murdoch, Brian (eds.). Early Germanic Literature and Culture. Boydell & Brewer. pp. 121–147. ISBN 9781571131997.
- Looijenga, Tineke (2003), Texts & Contexts of the Oldest Runic Inscriptions (PDF), Leiden: Koninklijke Brill NV, ISBN 90-04-12396-2, archived from the original (PDF) on 2022-05-08
