= O rune =

O rune can refer to:

- ᛟ [othala] – an elder rune which in the Elder Futhark corresponds to the letter o in the Latin alphabet
- ᚮ [óss] – a younger rune which in Medieval Runic corresponds to the letter o in the Latin alphabet
