= Johan Peringskiöld =

Swedish antiquarian

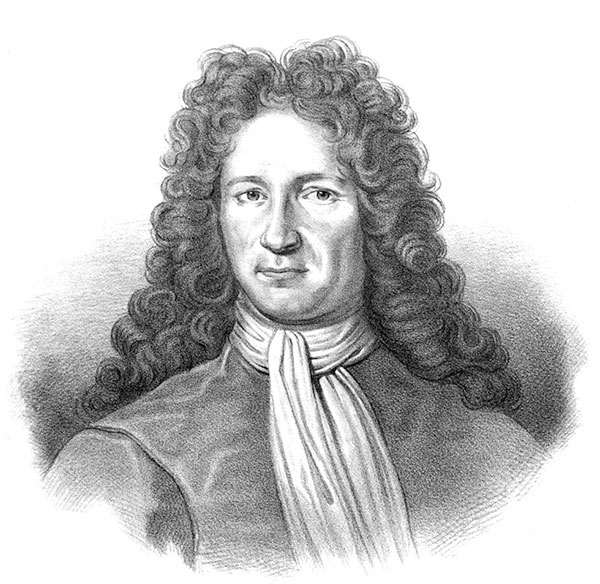
Johan Peringskiöld.

Johan Peringskiöld (6 October 1654 – 24 March 1720) was a Swedish antiquarian.

== Biography ==
Johan Peringer was born at Strängnäs in Södermanland County, Sweden. His father Lars Fredrik Peringer (1613-1687) was senior master at the gymnasium. His elder brother Gustaf Lillieblad (1651–1710) was a Swedish orientalist, professor and librarian. He began his studies at Uppsala University in 1677 and he was an ardent student of the national antiquities. In 1680, he received a position at the newly established college of antiquities. He advanced to the position of clerk at the college in 1682, and he could then accompany Johan Hadorph (1630-1693) on scientific excursions in the countryside, during which he listed and made drawings of runestones, hill forts, grave fields and other prehistoric monuments.

In 1689, he was appointed deputy judge, and in 1693, he was knighted and received the surname Peringskiöld as a sign of his nobility. In 1693, he was also appointed secretary of the college of antiquities, a task which was added to his work as a translator of Icelandic sources. In 1711, he left the work as translator to his son Johan Fredrik Peringskiöld (1689–1725). In 1715, he published a trilingual transmission titled Wilkina-Saga, aller Historien om Konung Thiderich af Bern, och hans Kämpar. In 1719, he applied to be removed from his offices. The request was granted and he received instead the title of chancellor, and the following year, he died.

He assiduously created an extensive collection on his country's history, but some of it was destroyed in the fire of Tre Kronor in 1697. What remains of his work is stored in the Swedish national archives and library. Like that of most historians of his time, his work lacked the scholarly criticism of modern days. He died in Stockholm.

== See also ==
- Fragmentum Runico-Papisticum

== Other sources ==
- Hofberg, H; Heurlin, F; Millqvist, V; Rubenson, O. (1909). Svenskt biografiskt handlexikon, tome II. p. 296 and p. 297. Stockholm, Albert Bonniers Boktryckeri.
- The article Peringskiöld in Nordisk familjebok (1915).
