= Johan Fredrik Peringskiöld =

Swedish translator

Johan Fredrik Peringskiöld (13 September 1689 – 2 March 1720) was a Swedish translator.

Johan was born in Stockholm, studied at Uppsala and was appointed as the successor of his father Johan Peringskiöld in 1712 as "translator antiquitatum" at the archive of antiquities. In 1719, he was appointed secretary and antiquarian, and he succeeded his father in 1720. He interpreted Adam of Bremen's description of Sweden (1718) and Jordanes' work Getica (1719), and he published Sögubrot af nokkurum fornkonungum í Dana- ok Svíaveldi (1719) in both Old Norse and translated form. Moreover, he translated Hjálmþés saga ok Ölvis (1720), Fragmentum runicopapisticum (1721) and Ásmundar saga kappabana (1722), in addition to publishing his father's translation of Ættartolur.

== See also ==
- Fragmentum Runico-Papisticum
