= *Ōþala =

Elder Futhark and Anglo-Saxon rune

Name	Proto-Germanic	Old English
Name	*Ōþala-	Ēþel
Name	"patrimony"	"property, home"
Shape	Elder Futhark	Futhorc
Unicode	ᛟ U+16DF	
Transliteration	o	œ
IPA	[o(ː)]	[ø(ː)]

ᛟ is a rune that is transliterated as o and œ in the Elder Futhark and the Anglo-Saxon Futhorc writing systems respectively. It is known as ēþel ("inheritance, home, native land") in Old English, from which hypothetical Proto-Germanic names such as *ōþala have been reconstructed.

As with other Elder Futhark runes, the origins of ᛟ are unclear, beyond an ultimate ancestor in the Phoenician alphabet. Various intermediate scripts and characters have been proposed, including the Greek Ω, which closely resembles it. Even more similar to the rune are some symbols representing "o" sounds in Etruscan and Alpine scripts. The rune may in turn be the origin of the Gothic letter 𐍉 ("utal"), used by Wulfila in the 4th century CE for his Gothic Bible, although Greek letters may also have been used as a source.

As ᛟ does not occur in Younger Futhark, it largely disappears from the Scandinavian record around the 8th century, but its usage continued in England into the 11th century, where alongside inscriptions was also used in manuscripts as a shorthand for the word ēþel, similarly to how other runes were could be used at the time.

Knowledge of the English form the rune continued into the 17th century due to manuscripts preserving the Old English rune poem and efforts of collectors who published copies of these. It features in the J. R. R. Tolkien's writing system of the dwarves in The Hobbit, first published in 1937. Also beginning in the 1930s, ᛟ was appropriated by Nazi occultists during the 1930s and 1940s, along with many other historical European symbols, including other runes. This became Odal, which continues to be used by neo-Nazis and far-right groups. ᛟ also continues to be used in popular culture, including in video games and Tolkien's other works, and by adherents of the new religious movement, Heathenry.

== Name and etymology ==
The sole attested name of the rune is Old English: ēþel or óðel ("property, inheritance, home, native land"). The Proto-Germanic name for the rune has therefore been reconstructed as *ōþala or *ōþila ("patrimony, inherited possession"). It has cognates with similar meanings in other Germanic languages, including Old Norse: óðal ("ancestral property", "patrimony", "inheritance"), Old Saxon: ōthil ("home") and Old High German: uodal ("ancestral property"). Alternative names for the rune include *ōðilan.

This general meaning is found in Old Norse: óðal, which refers to Scandinavian laws of inheritance which established land rights for families that had owned that parcel of land over a number of generations, restricting its sale to others. Among other aspects, this protected the inheritance rights of daughters against males from outside the immediate family. Some of these laws remain in effect today in Norway as the Odelsrett (allodial right). The tradition of Udal law found in Shetland, Orkney, and the Isle of Man, is from the same origin.

== Elder Futhark ==
ᛟ features in Elder Futhark, where it represents the /o:/ sound and is transliterated to the Latin script as o. As with other Elder Futhark runes, its exact origins are unclear beyond its ultimate descent from the Phoenician alphabet. Derivation from Latin O or Q has been proposed, however, while most Elder Futhark runes are more similar to capital Latin letters than to Greek ones, ᛟ more closely resembles Ω ("Omega"). North Italic alphabets have also been suggested as the source, including Venetic and Lepontic, and Letters with very similar sounds and shape are also known in Alpine and Etruscan scripts, suggesting these as a possible origin. Why the runes have their order is also unclear and debated, with little correspondence between it and that of potential source scripts. A notable alignment though is between ᛟ and Ω, which are both found at the end.

ᛟ is used throughout the body of Elder Futhark inscriptions to denotes the /o:/ sound. This includes some of the earliest runic inscriptions such as the Hole Runestone (c. 50 BCE-275 CE) and Vimose planer (c. 160-400 CE). It has also been suggested to be used as an ideograph representing the word "*oþal" on the Ring of Pietroassa, referencing the ring as hereditary treasure. It has been similarly proposed to denote the Thorsberg chape (c. 210-260 CE) as the inherited possession of the inscription's writer.

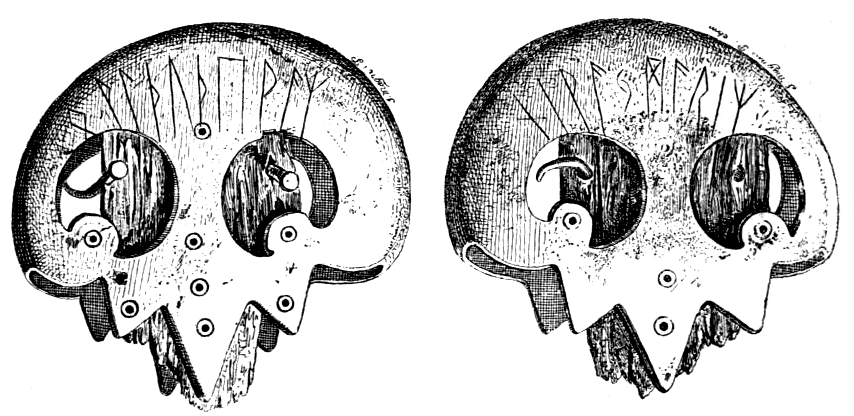
Illustration of the Thorsberg chape (c. 210-260 CE) showing the runic inscriptions on both sides

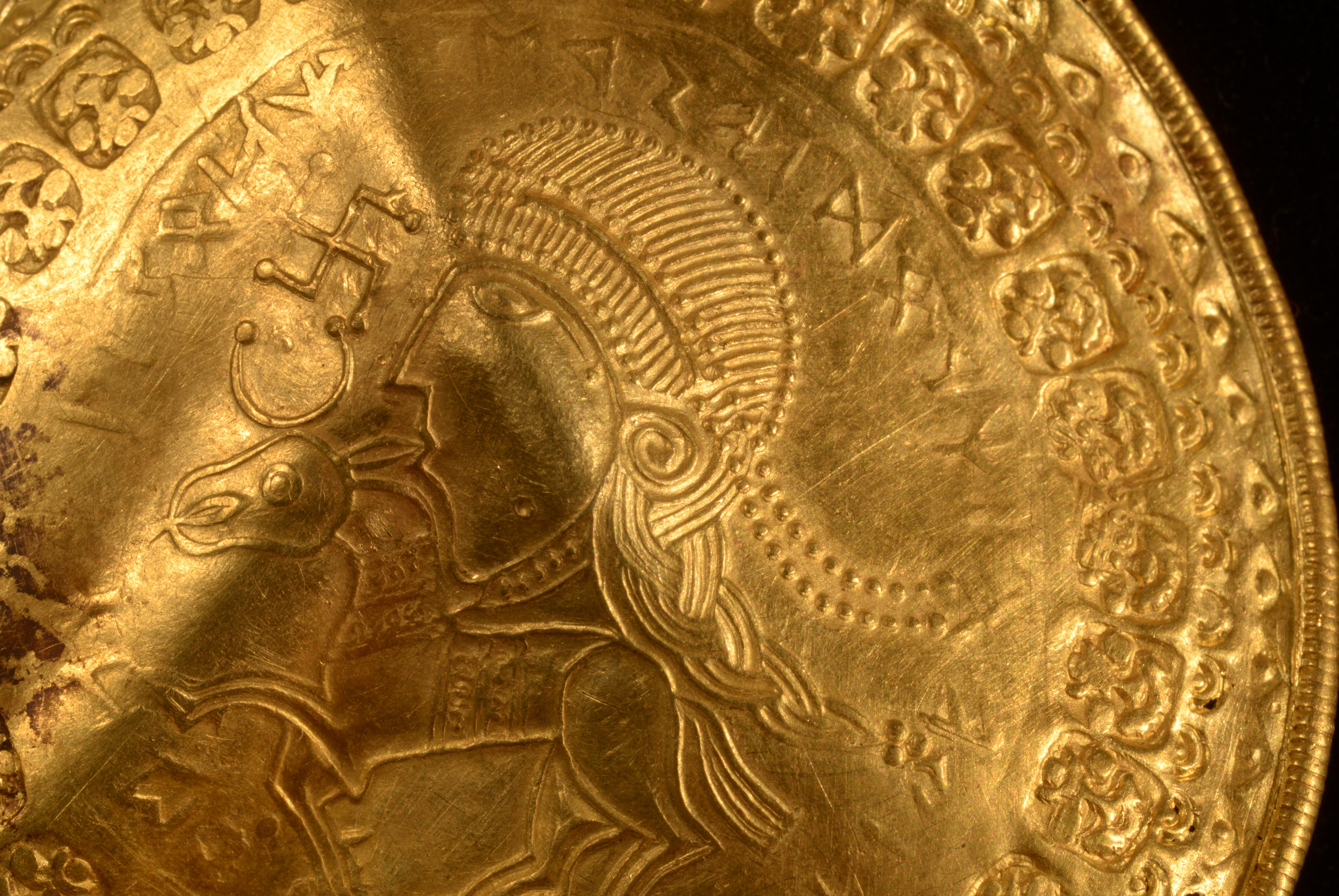
Bracteate from the Vindelev Hoard c. 375-470, showing the word wodnas ("Óðinn's") right to left

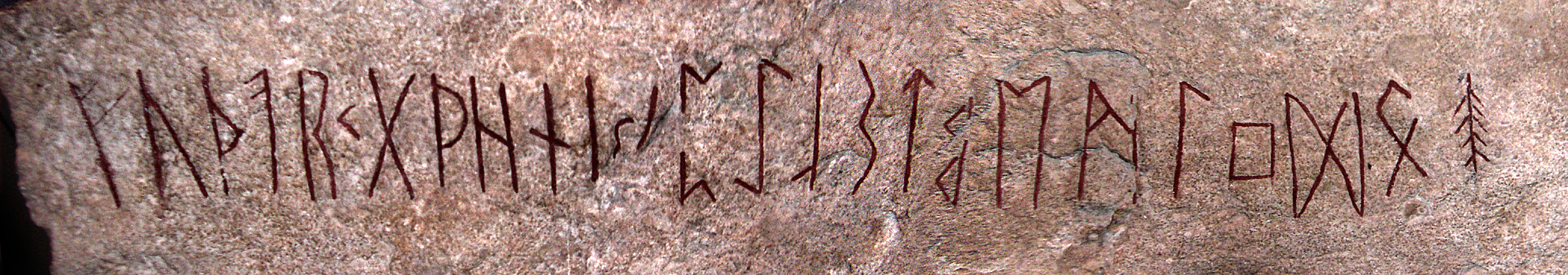
ᛟ at the end of the Kylver Stone rune-row c. 400.

== Relation to the Gothic alphabet ==
Gothic letter 𐍉 ("utal"), as depicted in Codex Vindobonensis 795.

The letter in the Gothic alphabet 𐍉 (utal) was used in the 4th century CE by Wulfila to represent an /o:/ sound in his Bible, and may have been derived from ᛟ. Alternatively, it may have been derived from the Greek Ω (omega), which closely resembles both, or ο (omicron). As with the names of most other Gothic letters, utal is cognate with the name of its corresponding rune, *ōþala. This name is recorded in a manuscript from around the 10th century, however, and it has been suggested that the names in general may have been created retrospectively based on rune names, long after the letters were.

== Anglo-Frisian Fuþorc ==
Usage of ᛟ continues into the Anglo-Frisian runes, where it was used along with all the other 23 Elder Futhark runes and new innovations. Anglo-Frisian sound changes led to it taking on the sound ø, also written as ö. ᛟ in Anglo-Frisian runes is therefore transliterated into Latin script as œ, while the /o:/ sound becomes represented by the new ᚩ, from the Elder Futhark ᚨ. When exactly these developments first took place and spread is unclear, however ᛟ seems to represent the œ vowel in all known English inscriptions that contain it and ᚩ is first attested early, on the 5th century Undley bracteate. Furthermore, both ᛟ and ᚩ are found on the pre-Old English Chessel Down inscription, suggesting the changes had taken place by c. 525-550 when this inscription was made. In contrast, the likely Frisian skanomodo solidus (before the mid 7th century), uses ᛟ for the /o:/ sound and there are no known Frisian inscriptions with ᚩ from before the 8th century. This absence could, however, be a result of there being very few known Frisian runic texts.

An alternative form of the rune developed in this writing system, in which it was written with a single vertical line instead of the two diagonal legs, perhaps due to its simpler form. This form is found in some manuscripts and more rarely in runic inscriptions, such as on the 10th century Seax of Beagnoth. The rune is also used ideographically as a shorthand for the word ēþel or œþel ("ancestral property or land") in manuscripts of texts such as Beowulf, Waldere and the Old English translation of Orosius' Historiae adversus paganos. This is similar to wider practices of the time, in which runes such as ᛞ, ᚹ and ᛗ were also used as shorthands to write the name of the rune. Furthermore, a stanza based on ᛟ's name "eþel" forms part of the Old English rune poem, composed in the 8th or 9th century and preserved in a now lost 10th century manuscript:

Old English text	Translation
'Eþel' bẏþ oferleof æghƿẏlcum men, gif he mot ðær rihtes and gerẏsena on brucan on bolde bleadum oftast.	To every man his home is very dear, as long as he can enjoy his rights and proper station there, in his own house, for the most part prosperously.

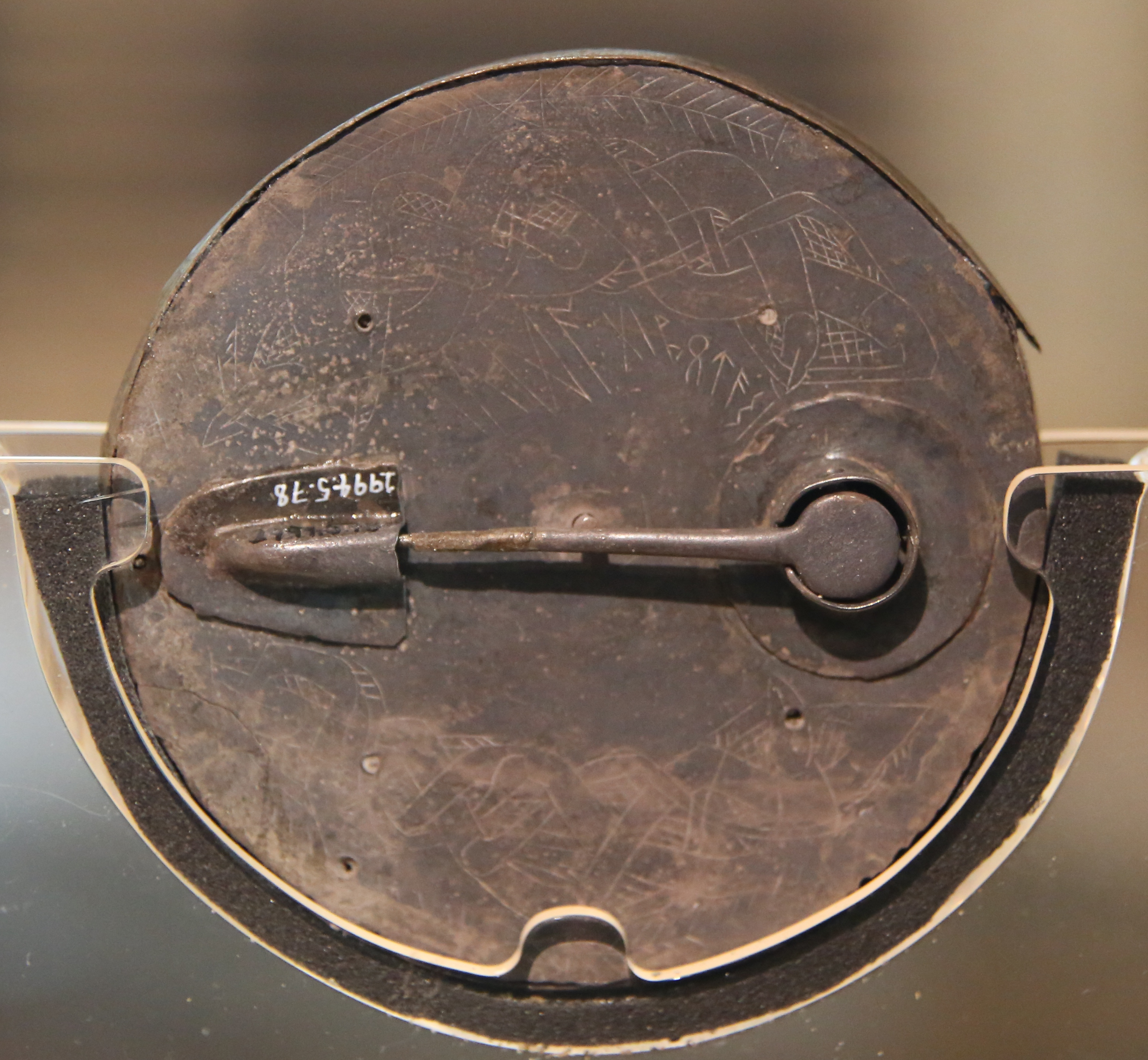
Back of the Harford Farm Brooch (c. 610-650)

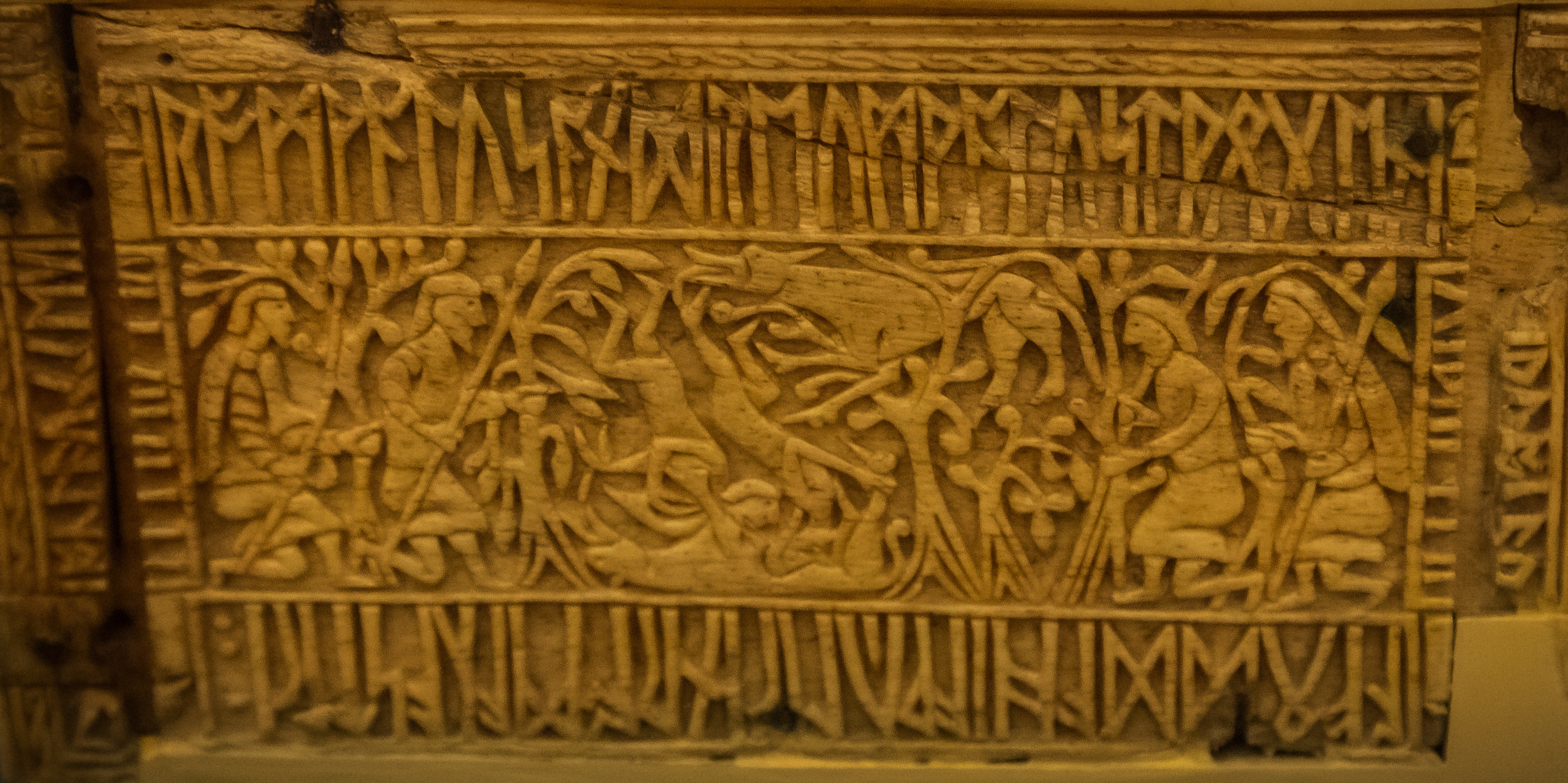
The left panel of the Franks Casket (early 8th century), showing the rune on both the top right and bottom right

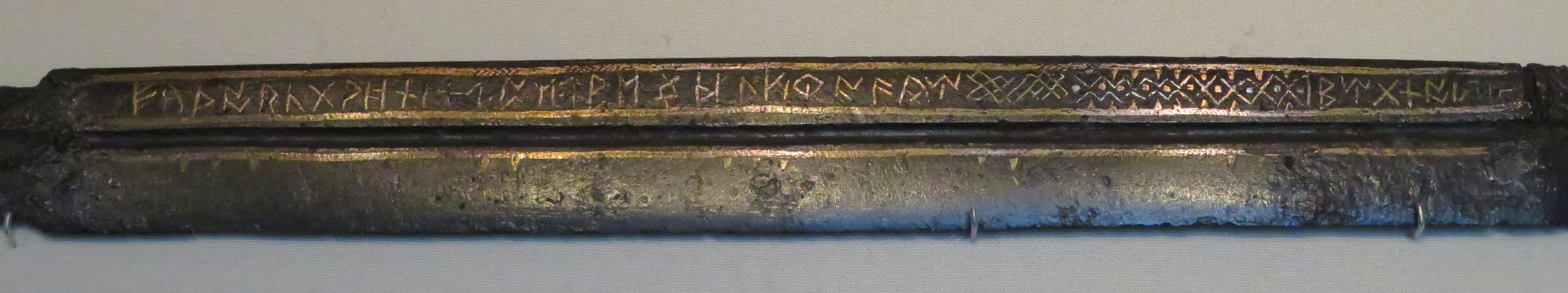
Seax of Beagnoth rune row (c. 10th century), showing the alternative rune form between the ᛗ and ᚪ

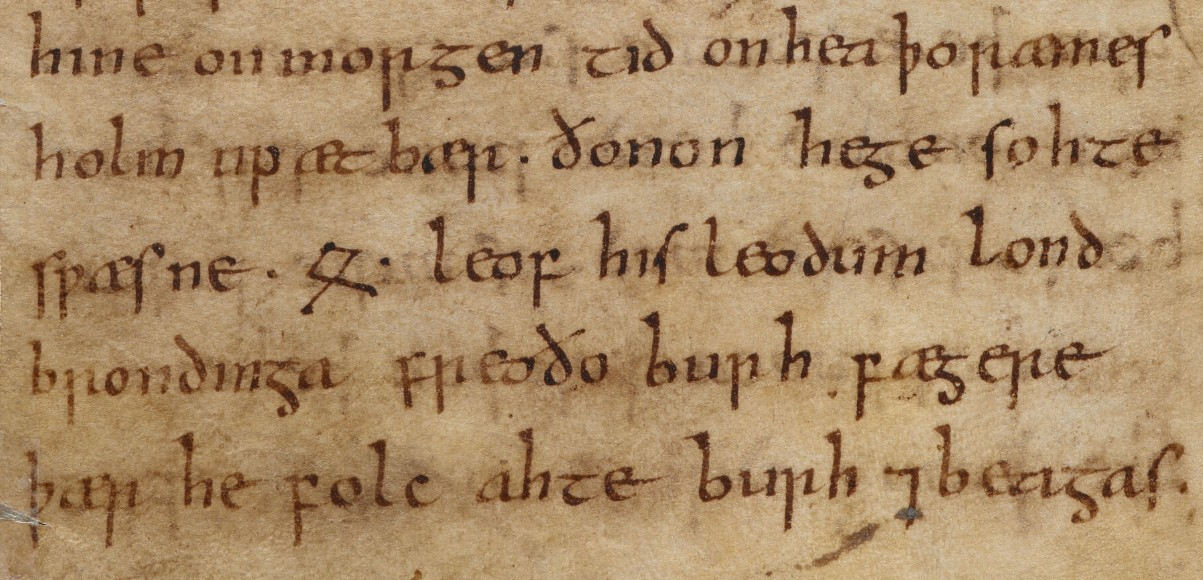
Section of Beowulf in the Nowell Codex (late 10th-early 11th century), showing the rune to represent the word "ēðel"

== Transition to Younger Futhark ==
While ᛟ continued to be used in England, it largely disappeared in Scandinavia during the development of the Younger Futhark, which began to emerge shortly after 700 CE. In this new system, the /o/ phoneme became instead written in the same way as /u/ phoneme and all other rounded vowels, with ᚢ. The reason for the loss of ᛟ, alongside 7 other elder futhark runes, is debated but was possibly a choice to use the more simple shape of ᚢ. It may also have been influenced by sound changes of the rune names, with *ōþila likely developing into *œðil. This vowel mutation left no rune with a name matching the /o/ sound. Furthermore, it may have not been seen as worth keeping a dedicated rune to write the rare "œ" vowel that the rune name now began with.

ᛟ is found in some transitional inscriptions that use both Elder Futhark and new rune shapes, including those that would become Younger Futhark. Many of these include ᚼ, representing an /a/ sound, alongside runes elsewhere only found in Elder Futhark inscriptions, as in the c. 7th century Stentoften Runestone. ᛟ is also attested on the mostly Younger Futhark Rök runestone, dating to around 800 CE. In this context, the choice to use older runes has been proposed to be an intentional reference to an event nine generations ago mentioned in the inscription.

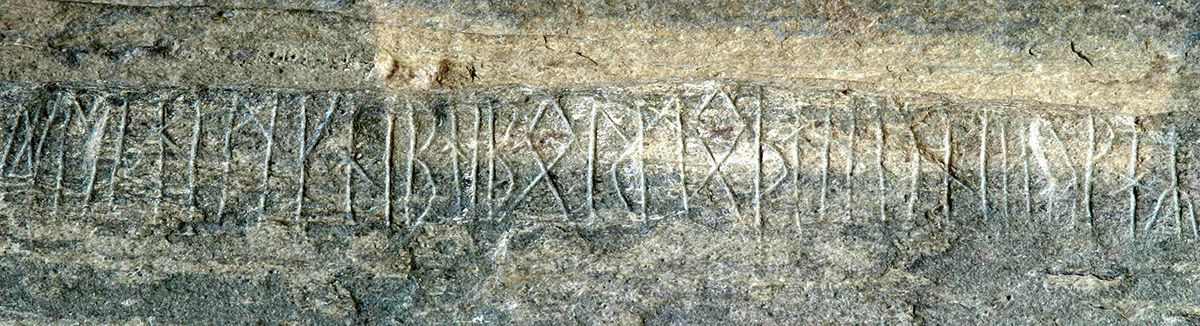
Eggja stone (c. 650-700 CE, with both ᛟ and ᚼ

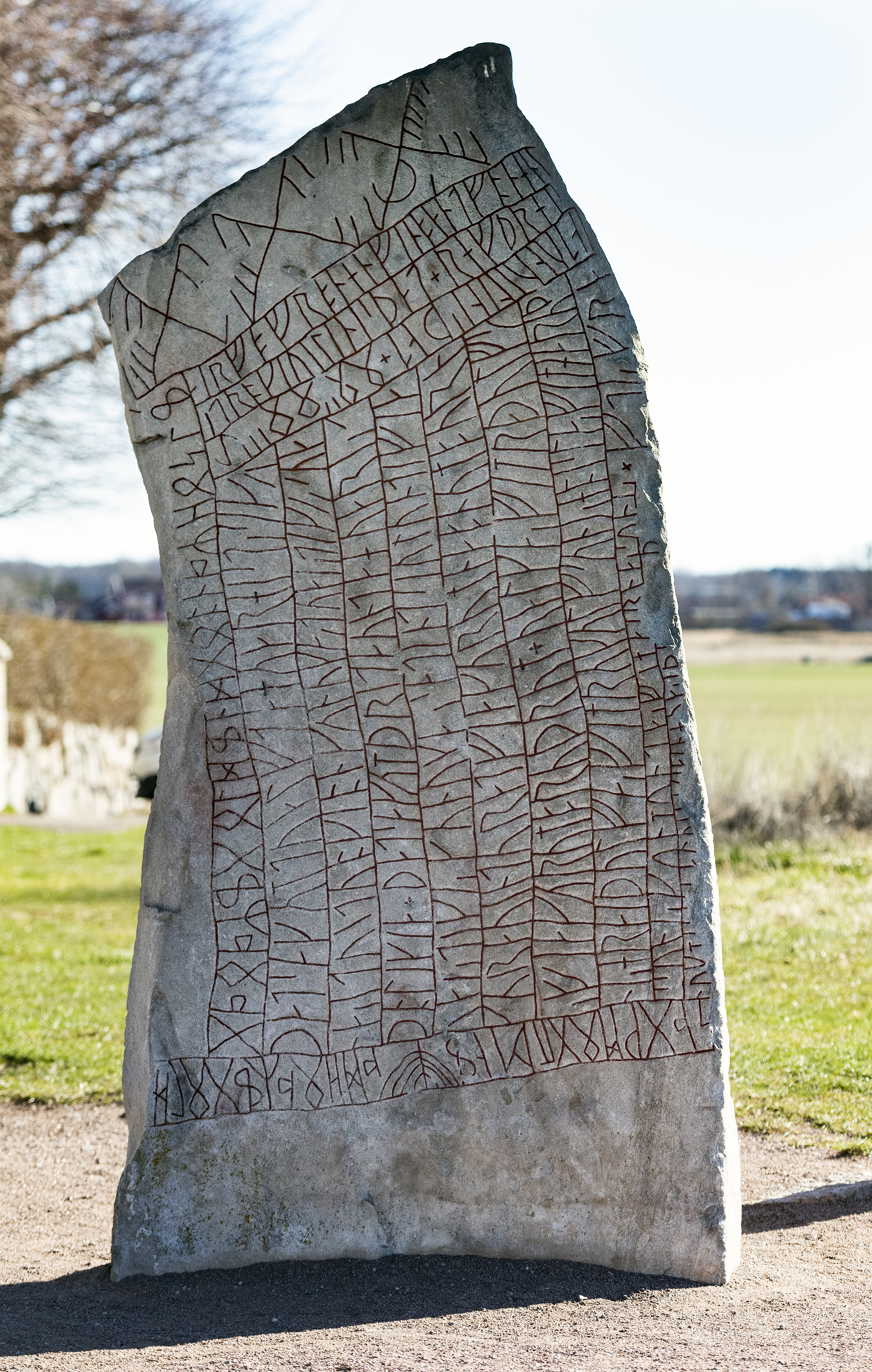
Rök runestone (c. 800 CE), showing ᛟ alongside Younger Futhark runes

== Modern period ==
=== Runology ===
ᛟ and the rest of the fuþorc were still known in England in the 17th century due to continued knowledge of early medieval manuscripts and collectors, such as George Hickes who made copies of Old English texts such as the Old English rune poem.

=== Popular culture ===
Inscription from The Fellowship of the Ring, written in English using Tolkien's Angerthas Erebor script, in which the rune based on ᛟ represents a "u" sound. It reads left-to-right: "Balin sʌn ov Fu[nd]in lord ov Moria"

Like other historical runes, ᛟ is widely used in popular culture, including by J.R.R. Tolkien on Thror's map of Erebor in The Hobbit, published in 1937. Runes such as ᛟ further form the base for the dwarvish Cirth writing systems used in The Lord of the Rings, published in 1954 and 1955, and described in Tolkien's Legendarium. It is also used as the symbol for the "Lore" resource in Northgard, released in 2018. In Stargate SG-1, the rune is used as the symbol of the Asgard in a declaration of alliance with three other races, and "Othala" is later revealed to also be the name of one of their worlds in their home galaxy of Ida.

=== SS-rune ===
The "Winged Othala" used by far-right groups.

ᛟ, like some other runes, was adopted as an occult symbol by German Nazi occultists and thereof in the 1930s, later being adopted by the German Schutzstaffel (SS) as an SS-rune to symbolise kinship, family and blood ties within the Aryan race. The SS modified the symbol with serifs, also called "feet" or "wings", subsequently being nicknamed "Winged Othala" and thereof in modern times. It was subsequently used by various military divisions within the German Army during World War II and also became the badge of the SS Race and Settlement Main Office, which was responsible for maintaining the racial purity of the SS.

After World War II, this symbol has seen continued by Neo-Nazis and similar far-right collectives. White supremacists who use the rune often claim it symbolises the heritage or land of "white" or "Aryan" people which should be free from foreigners. Usages such as these are not attested in any source from before the modern period, being invented by members of these groups.

The Anti-Defamation League notes that because it is part of the runic alphabet, ᛟ rune is often used in non-racist manners and should be interpreted in its context of use.

=== Heathenry ===
ᛟ, along with other runes more widely, often feature prominently in the practices of Heathens, and are commonly used to decorate items and in tattoos. The use of runes such as ᛟ by far-right groups has been strongly condemned by some Heathen groups, including Asatru UK which released a public statement that "[it] is categorically opposed to fascist movements, or any movements, using the symbols of our faith for hate".

== Bibliography ==
=== Primary ===
- Shippey, T. A. (1976). Poems of wisdom and learning in Old English. Cambridge, Eng. : D. S. Brewer; Totowa, N.J. : Rowman and Littlefield. ISBN 978-0-87471-789-1.
- Tolkien, J.R.R. (1937). The Hobbit. London: George Allen & Unwin.
- Tolkien, J. R. R. (1955). The Return of the King – Being the Third Part of The Lord of the Rings; Appendix E. London: George Allen & Unwin.

=== Secondary ===
- Barnes, Michael P. (7 August 2012). "The Transitional Inscriptions". Proceedings of the Fourth International Symposium on Runes and Runic Inscriptions in Göttingen (in German). Walter de Gruyter. ISBN 978-3-11-082190-1.
- Barnes, Michael P. (2022). Runes: a handbook (paperback ed.). Woodbridge Rochester, NY: the Boydell press. ISBN 9781783276974.
- Blain, Jenny (2005). Modern paganism in world cultures: comparative perspectives. Santa Barbara, Calif.: ABC-CLIO. ISBN 9781851096084.
- Calico, Jefferson F. (2018). Being Viking: heathenism in contemporary America. Bristol. p. 118. ISBN 9781781792230.
- Haarmann, Harald (1991). Universalgeschichte der Schrift. Frankfurt: Campus. ISBN 3-593-34346-0.
- Harvey, Graham (1997). Listening people, speaking earth: contemporary paganism. London: Hurst & Co. p. 61. ISBN 978185065-2724.
- Hines, John (2017). "The Anglo-Frisian Question". Frisians and their North Sea Neighbours: From the Fifth Century to the Viking Age (NED - New ed.). Boydell & Brewer. pp. 25–42. ISBN 978-1-78327-179-5. JSTOR 10.7722/j.ctt1t6p55t.11.
- Holmberg, Per; Gräslund, Bo; Sundqvist, Olof; Williams, Henrik (2020). "The Rök Runestone and the End of the World". Futhark: International Journal of Runic Studies. 9–10: 7–38. doi:10.33063/diva-401040.
- Imer, Lisbeth M.; Vasshus, Krister S. K. (19 June 2023). "Lost in transition: The runic bracteates from the Vindelev hoard". NOWELE. North-Western European Language Evolution. 76 (1): 60–99. doi:10.1075/nowele.00074.ime. hdl:109.1.5/933070d1-acfe-4ebf-9dbf-35dcd9db066f. ISSN 0108-8416.
- Joseph, Jared; Fritz, Brian; Klein, Matthias (2018). Handbook of comparative and historical Indo-European linguistics: Volume 2. Berlin Boston: De Gruyter Mouton. ISBN 978311052161-0.
- Kroonen, Guus (2013). Etymological Dictionary of Proto-Germanic.
- Liestøl, Aslak (1981). "The VIking runes: the transition from the older to the younger fuþark" (PDF). Saga-Book. XX (4): 247–266.
- Looijenga, Tineke (1996). "On the origin of the Anglo-Frisian runic innovations". Amsterdamer Beiträge zur Älteren Germanistik. 45 (1): 109–122. doi:10.1163/18756719-045-01-90000012. ISSN 0165-7305.
- Looijenga, Tineke (2021). "How the runes were lost and won...". Aprender la escritura, olvidar la escritura: nuevas perspectivas sobre la historia de la escritura en el Occidente romano. Vitoria: Universidad del País Vasco. ISBN 9788413193175.
- Marchand, James (1973). The Sounds and Phonemes of Wulfila's Gothic. De Gruyter Mouton.
- Mees, Bernard (2000). "The North Etruscan Thesis of the Origin of the Runes". Arkiv för nordisk filologi (in Swedish). 115: 33–82. ISSN 0066-7668.
- Miller, D. Gary (2019). The Oxford Gothic Grammar. Oxford: Oxford University Press.
- Page, R. I. (2003). An introduction to English runes (2nd ed.). Woodbridge, UK: Boydell Press. ISBN 085115946X.
- Price, Neil S. (2022). The children of ash and elm: a history of the Vikings. London: Penguin. ISBN 9780141984445.
- Robertson, John S. (2011). "How the Germanic Futhark Came from the Roman Alphabet" (PDF). Futhark: International Journal of Runic Studies. 2: 7–26.
- Silva, Inmaculada Senra (1 January 2006). "A note on the meaning of os in the Old English Rune Poem". Epos: Revista de filología (22): 393. doi:10.5944/epos.22.2006.10523 (inactive 5 May 2026). ISSN 2255-3495.
- Solheim, Steinar; Zilmer, Kristel; Zawalska, Judyta; Vasshus, Krister Sande Kristoffersen; Sand-Eriksen, Anette; Kimball, Justin J.L.; Havstein, John Asbjørn Munch (2025). "Inscribed Sandstone Fragments of Hole, Norway: Radiocarbon Dates Provide Insight into Rune-Stone Traditions". Antiquity. 99 (404): 422–439. doi:10.15184/aqy.2024.225.
- Vennemann, Theo (6 November 2015). "Origins of runic writing: A comparison of theories". The Linguistic Roots of Europe: Origin and Development of European Languages. Museum Tusculanum Press. ISBN 978-87-635-4209-8.
- Waxenberger, Gaby (2017). "How 'English' is the Early Frisian Runic Corpus? The evidence of sounds and forms". Frisians and Their North Sea Neighbours: From the Fifth Century to the Viking Age. Boydell & Brewer. ISBN 978-1-78327-179-5.
- Williams, Henrik (2001). "From Heldorf to Haithabu: some early personal names from Schleswig-Holstein". Von Thorsberg nach Schleswig: Sprache und Schriftlichkeit eines Grenzgebietes im Wandel eines Jahrtausends. Internationales Kolloquium im Wikinger Museum Haithabu vom 29. September - 3. Oktober 1994 (in German). Walter de Gruyter. pp. 149–166. ISBN 978-3-11-082282-3.
- "Othala Rune". www.adl.org.
- "Asatru UK, In response to the Daily Telegraph article". Facebook.
- "Northgard - Balancing Patch 7 - July 2021 - Steam News". store.steampowered.com. 20 July 2021.
- "Runor". app.raa.se.
- "Runor". app.raa.se.
- Bosworth, Joseph (2014). "ÉÐEL". An Anglo-Saxon Dictionary Online. Faculty of Arts, Charles University.
- "casket | British Museum". The British Museum.
- "seax". British Museum.
- "Collections object page". Museums Collections - Norfolk Museums Service.
