= Östergötland Runic Inscription 43 =

Viking Age runic inscription in Sweden

Coordinates: 58°36′44″N 16°10′21″E

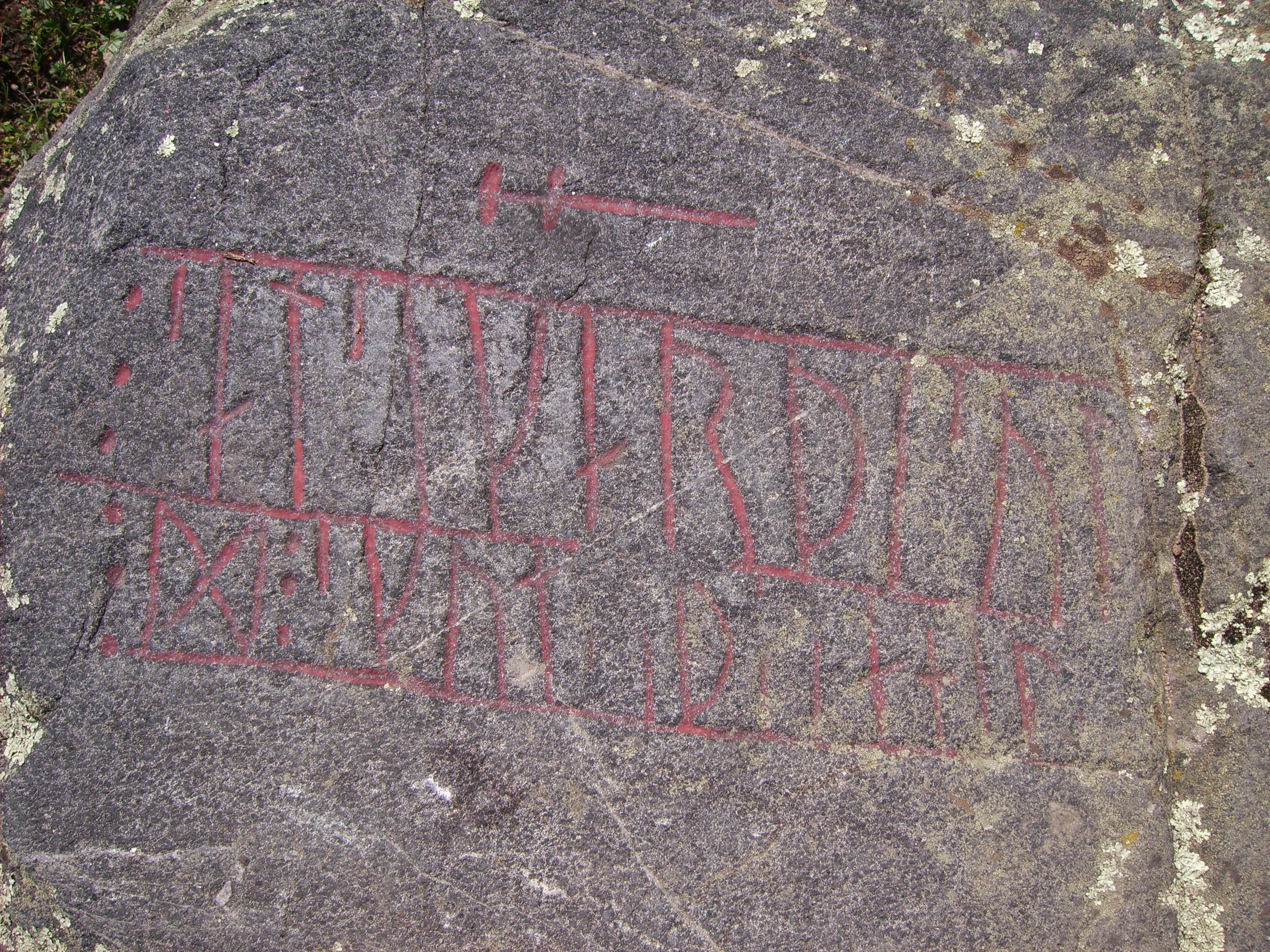
Inscription Ög 43 in Ingelstad, Östergötland, Sweden.

Östergötland Runic Inscription 43 or Ög 43 is the Rundata catalog number for a Viking Age runic inscription carved on a rockface in Ingelstad, just north of Norrköping, Östergötland, Sweden.

== Description ==
Ög 43 is carved on a granite rockface consisting of two lines of text within runic text bars that are approximately 0.4 meters in length. Above it is carved a sword, and a cross and Nordic sun symbol are also carved nearby. The runic text is in the younger futhark except for the first rune in the second line, which uses the form of the d-rune,, from the elder futhark.

The Rök runestone, dated to this same period, also mixes runes from both futharks in its inscription. Because of this, it has been dated to approximately 850 C.E. The association of the carving of a sun with the word sól along with the use of an anachronistic d-rune may suggest it is a ritualistic comparison of the dim winter sun and the bright summer sun, and represents a runic magic call for the sun to shine.

The d-rune of the second line has been transcribed into Old Norse as an ideographic rune that uses the name for this rune, which means "day," as the personal name Dagr. This name also appears spelled out in the runic texts on inscriptions Vg 101 in Bragnum and Vg 113 in Lärkegapet, and Dagr is also the personification of day in Norse mythology.

== Inscription ==
=== Latin transliteration ===
÷ salsi karþi sul ÷ D ÷ skut- - þ--a hiu ×

=== Old Norse transcription ===
Sôlsi gerði sól. Dagr(?) skút[a(?) í(?)] þ[ett]a(?) hjó.

=== English translation ===
Sôlsi(?) made(?) the sun(?). Dagr(?) cut(?) this(?) on the cliff-face.

== Gallery ==
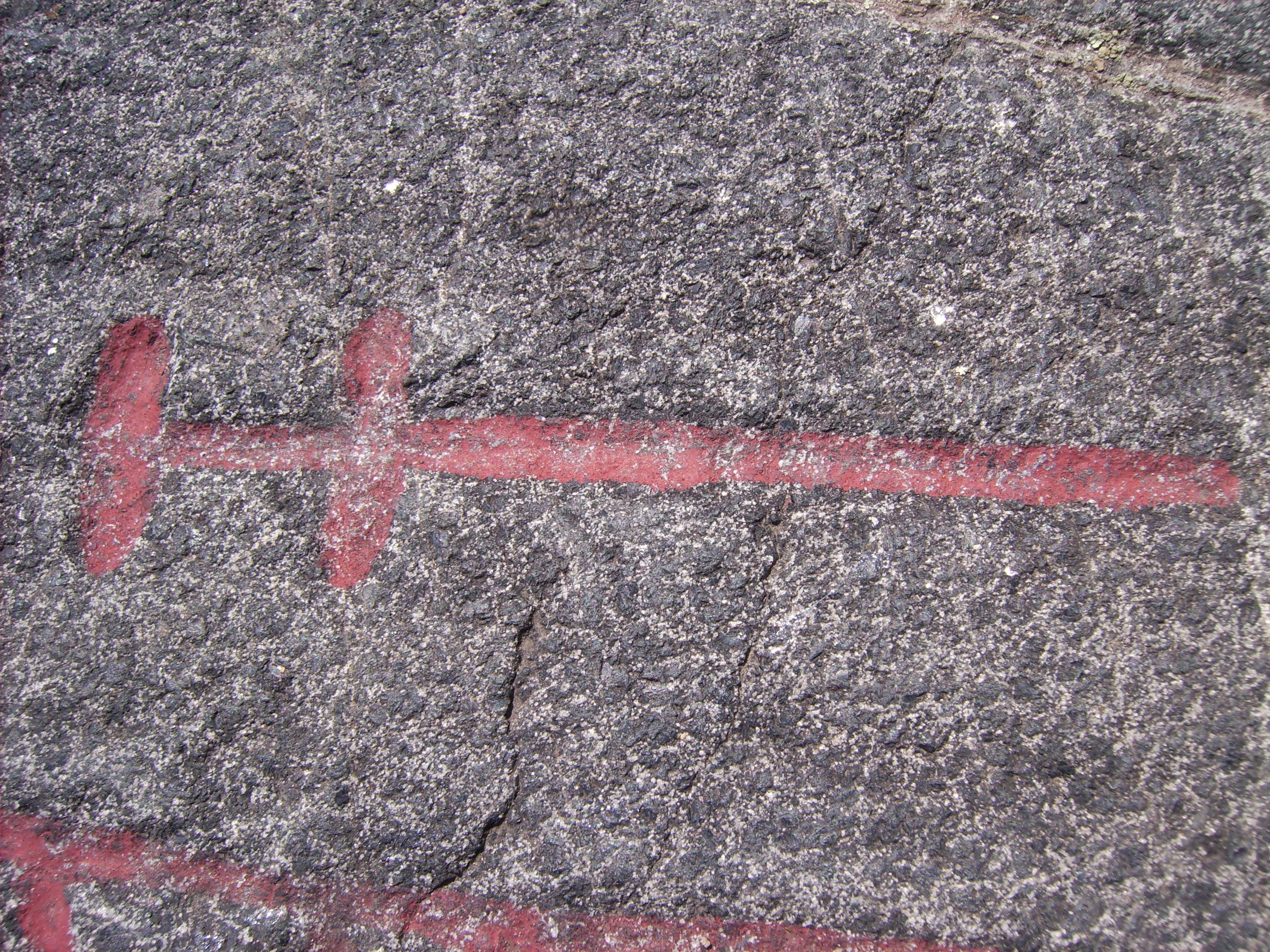
Detail showing the sword above the text.

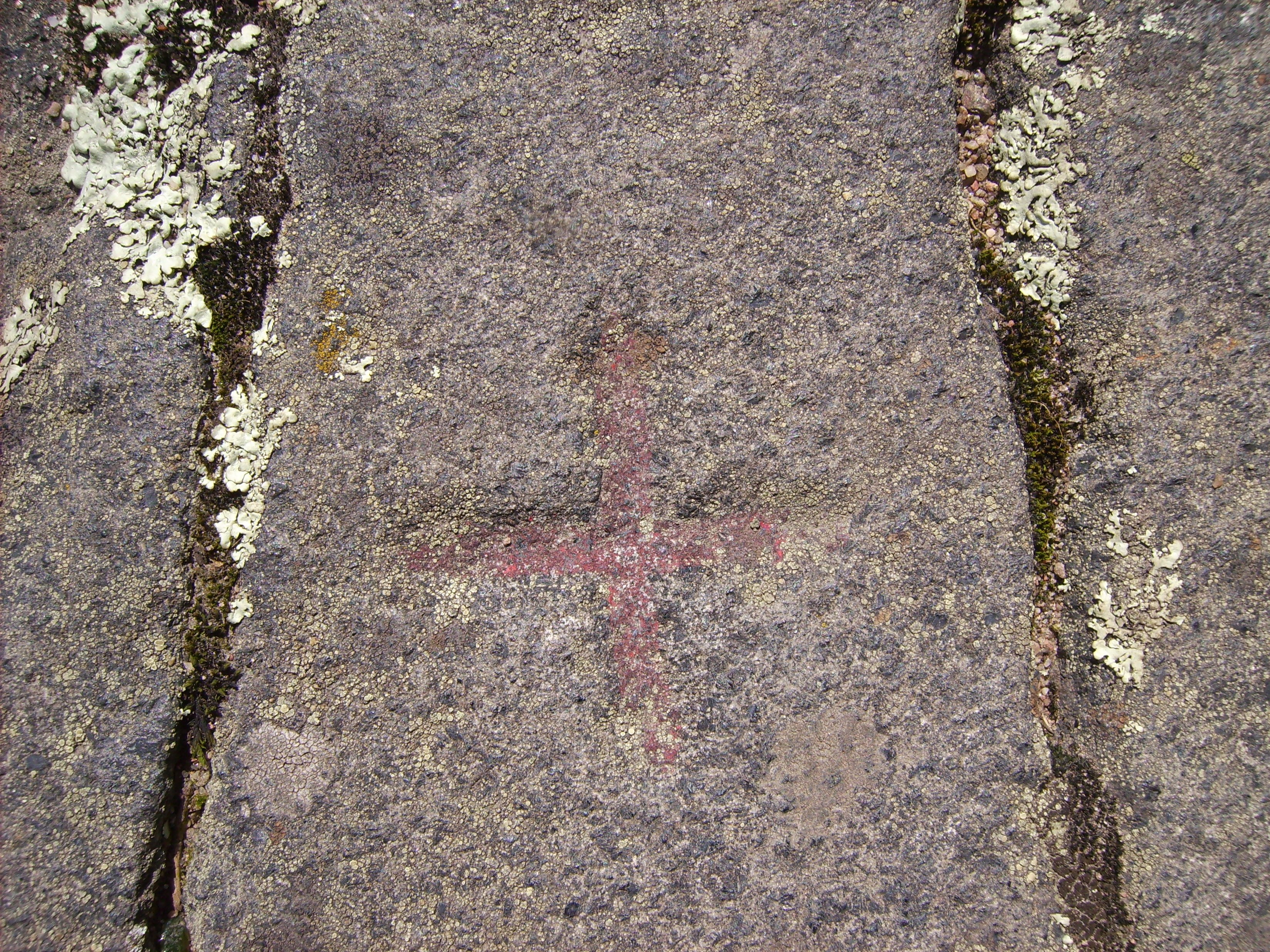
Detail showing the nearby cross.

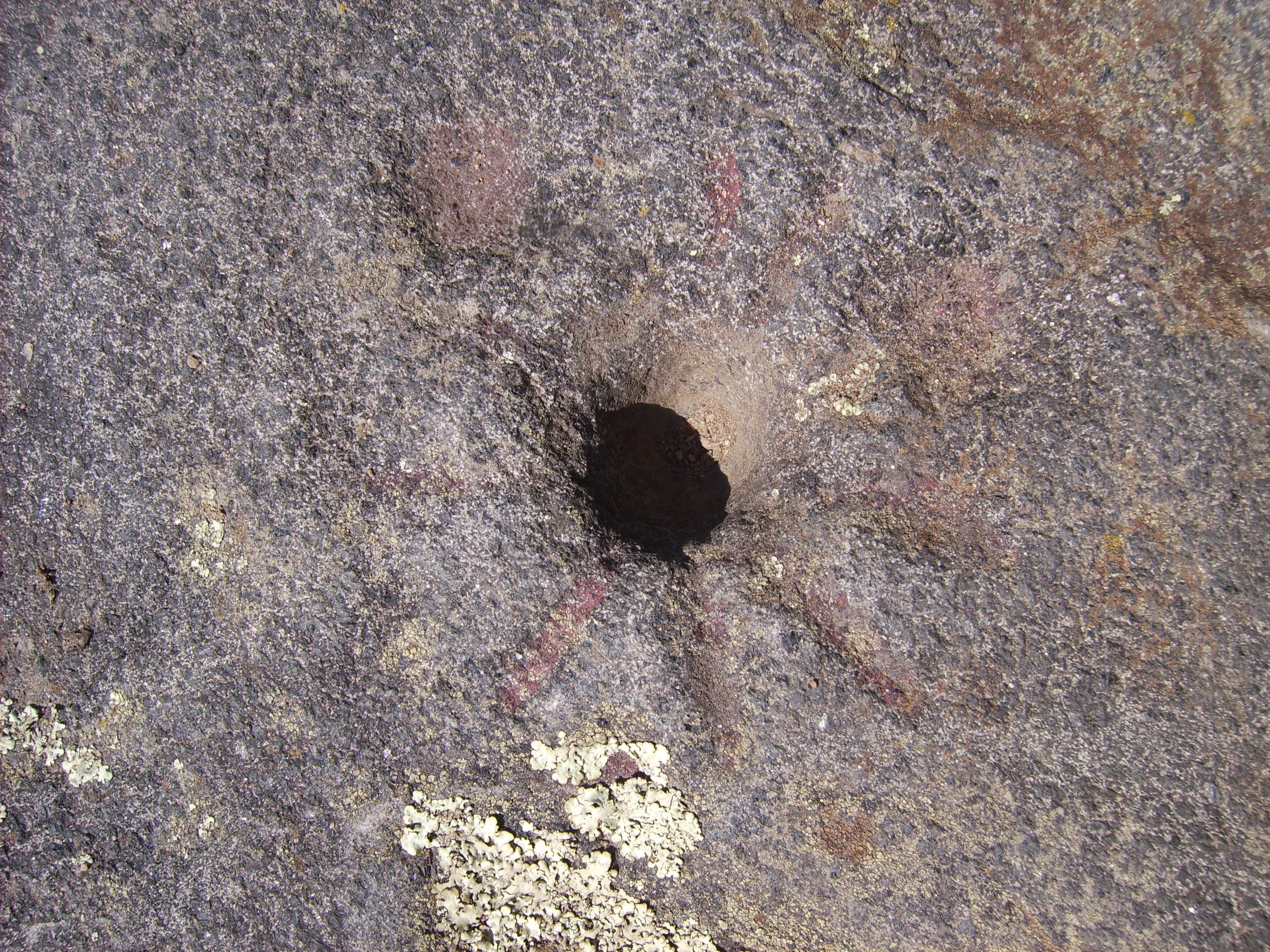
Detail showing the nearby sun.

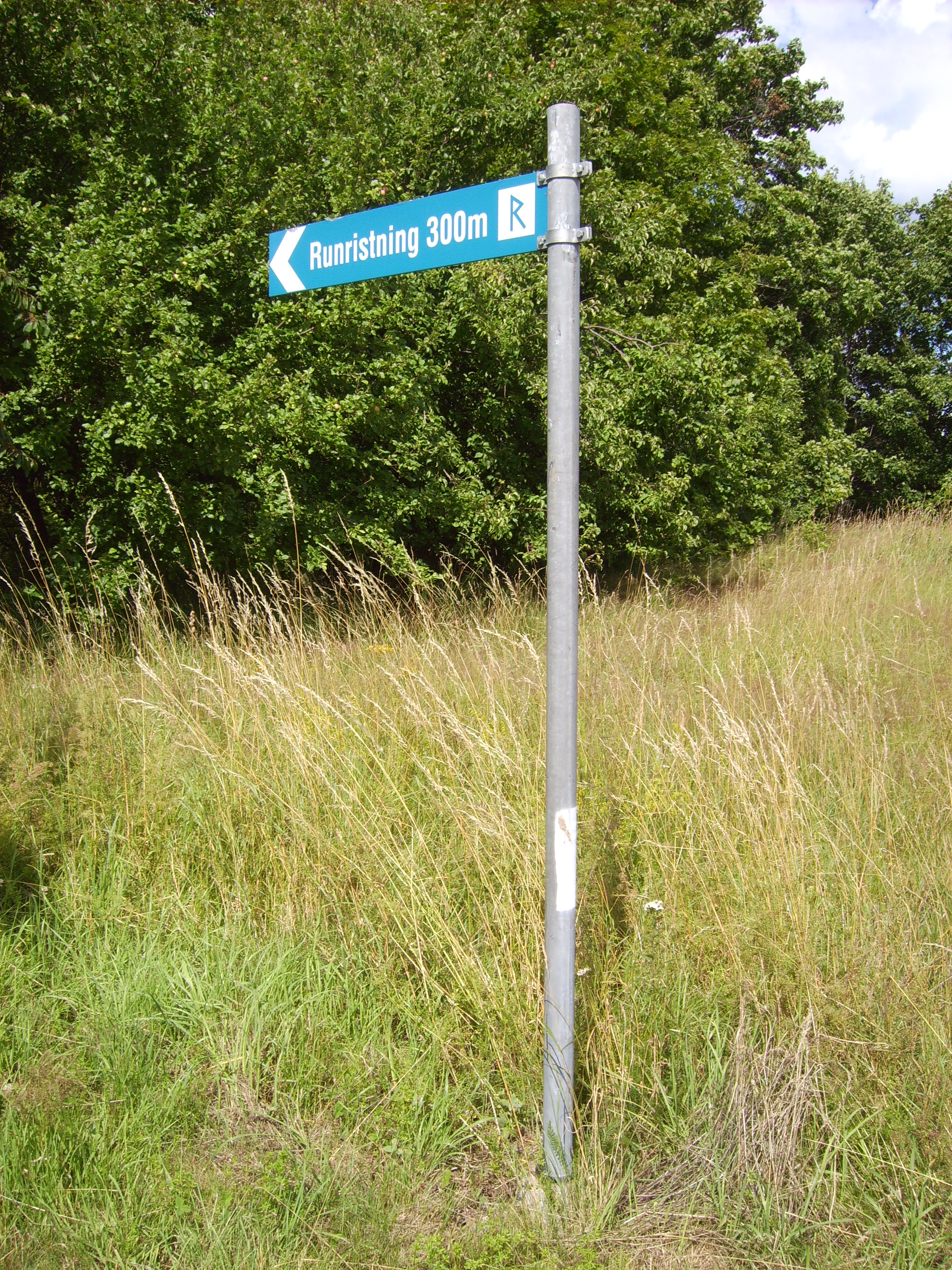
Roadsign pointing to the inscription.
