= Blanke Bevrydingsbeweging =

South African neo-Nazi organisation

White Liberation Movement
- Blanke Bevrydingsbeweging
- The Odal SS-rune, adopted by the BBB as its symbol.
- Other name: BBB
- Leader: Johan Schabort
- Founded: 1 June 1985
- Dissolved: November 1988 (banned)
- Country: South Africa
- Headquarters: Pretoria, South Africa
- Ideology: Neo-Nazism; White supremacy
- Political position: Far-right
- Status: Inactive

The White Liberation Movement (Afrikaans: Blanke Bevrydingsbeweging, abbreviated BBB) was a South African neo-Nazi organisation which became infamous after being banned under the Apartheid regime, the first right-wing organisation to be banned as such. It regarded itself as the most far-right organisation in South Africa.

== History ==
The organisation was formed in June 1985 by Professor Johan Schabort. It started as the support organisation for Schabort's Blanke Party (White Party), which existed only in name. In June 1987 the BBB went public and sought to recruit members, aiming at both Afrikaners and White British.

Its honorary leader was Theuns Stoffberg, a former member of the Greyshirts. Another notable member was Keith Conroy, an Englishman who would later become Kommandant of the AWB's 'Iron Guard'.

== Activities ==
In August 1987 Schabort attended and spoke at a commemorative service for Rudolf Hess organised by the Afrikaner Weerstandsbeweging (AWB). The BBB would organise inflammatory meeting and marches. The BBB sought to link with international right-wing organisations.

The BBB ran a "blatantly racist" bilingual magazine Kommando: Stem van die Blankedom/Kommando: Voice of the White Race published by Alan Harvey. Harvey was deputy leader of the South Natal branch (its leader was Peter Smith); Harvey had previously published and edited the South African Patriot magazine in Durban, under the "Patriotic Press" imprint. This magazine carried advertisements of several far right organisations around the world, including David Duke's the National Association for the Advancement of White People, National Vanguard magazine issued by the National Alliance, Instauration magazine, the British cultural magazine Heritage and Destiny, the National Front's Nationalism Today (to which Harvey contributed both under his own name and under the pseudonym "John Humphries"), and NF News. Harvey contributed to the BBB's publication under his own name.

== Ban ==
The BBB was banned, and restrictions were placed on the political activities of Schabort in November 1988, in reaction to the massacre of black South Africans in Pretoria by Barend Strydom. This was the first time such restrictions had been placed on a right wing organisation. In banning the group, Adriaan Vlok, the Law and Order Minister, said that the group were "right-wing, fanatical extremists who favour violence to carry racism to its extreme".

In December 1988, Schabort re-launched the BBB as the Blanke Nasionale Beweging (White National Movement) under the nominal leadership of Wynand de Beer; however, as its activities were clearly the same as the BBB, it was banned at the beginning of 1989.

The government lifted the ban on the BBB in February 1990.

Schabort officially disbanded the BBB and the Blanke Party in 1990, and joined the Conservative Party. Some members of the BBB, like Keith Conroy, would go on to support the Afrikaner Volksfront.

=== Later events ===
A few members, led by Jean Pierre du Plessis, sought to continue the BBB, with the BBB as the political wing to which would be added an underground organisation called the National Socialist Partisans (NSP). Schabort chose not to become involved. Du Plessis continued to form the NSP as a cell; its flag was "basically white with a red cross and a swastika". NSP members were arrested in 1991 for the murder of three black people at Louis Trichardt.

Following the bombing of a taxi rank in Germiston on 26 April 1994, which killed ten people, it was claimed in the press that the BBB were responsible; Schabort denied this.

== Ideology ==
The Truth and Reconciliation Commission described the BBB's ideology as "refined nazism". Schabort himself described the organisation as "openly racist". It was white supremacist and against race mixing. The BBB regarded blacks as 'mud people' or 'mud race'. The BBB sought the 'repatriation' (expulsion) of blacks from South Africa, "by violence if necessary". It was openly antisemitic, regarding Jews as existing between white and blacks, and denied the Holocaust. The BBB was against democracy and sought a new economic order.

The AWB criticised the BBB for being anti-Christian and atheistic; the BBB's tendency was towards the Church of the Creator. The BBB used the winged variant of the Odal SS-rune as its symbol.
