= Gustaf Lillieblad =

Swedish orientalist, professor and librarian

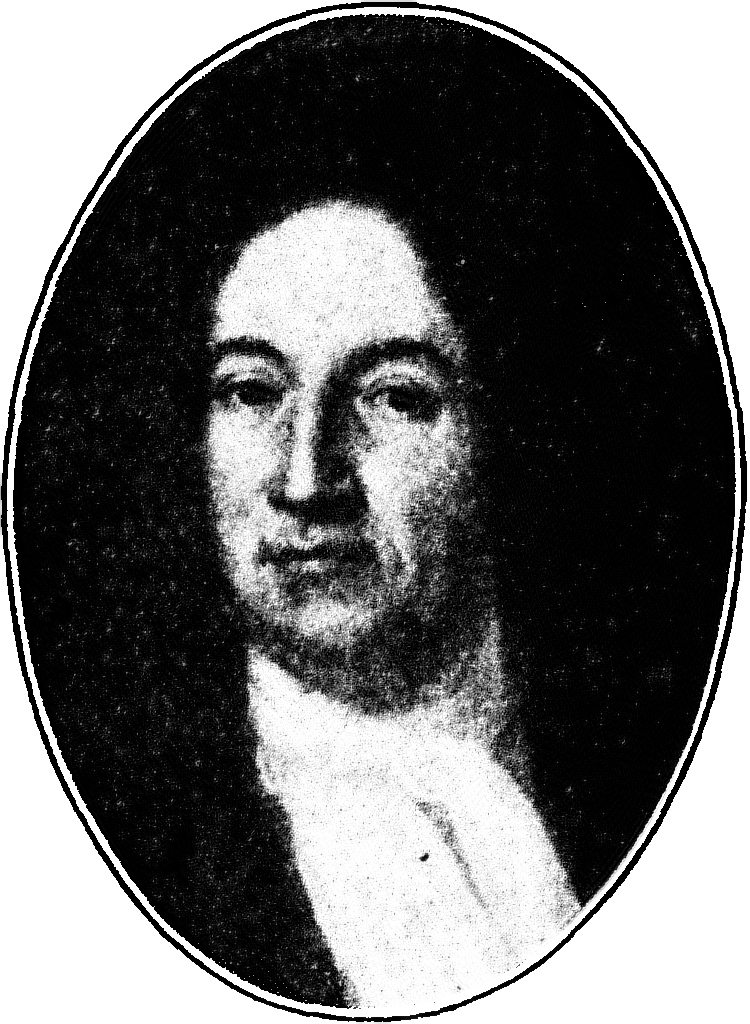
Lillieblad.

Gustaf Lillieblad or Gustaf Peringer (6 March 1651 – 5 January 1710) was a Swedish orientalist, professor and librarian.

== Biography ==
Gustaf Peringer was born at Strängnäs in Södermanland, Sweden. His father Lars Fredrik Peringer (1613-1687) was senior master at the gymnasium. His brother Johan Peringskiöld (1654-1720) was secretary of the National College of Antiquities. His surname would be changed to Lillieblad upon acquiring noble title.

Peringer entered to Uppsala University in 1671, where his interest was directed to the Eastern languages, mainly Persian, Turkish and Arabic, In 1675 he published a dissertation on the subject. He traveled extensively but mainly in the European continent, gaining knowledge of the languages including Hebrew, Chaldean, Syriac, Arabic, Turkish, and Ethiopian languages. He returned to Sweden in 1681, and was appointed professor of Oriental Languages in the University of Uppsala. King Charles XII sent him to Poland to study Karaite Judaism, which led to the publication in 1691 of Epistola de Karaitis Lithuaniae ad Johan Ludolphum. In 1695, was appointed royal secretary and censor librorum and was appointed court librarian of the Royal Library in 1703.

== Selected works ==
- Concio laudibus nobilium in orbe Eoo idiomatum dicta, Stockholm, 1674.
- Duo codices Talmudici Avoda Sara et Tamid cum paraphrasi Latina, Altdorf, 1680.
- Mos. Maimonidae tractatus de primitiis, cum vers. Anal. Upsal, 1694–95.
- De templo Herculis Gaditano, Stockholm, 1695.
- Historia rerum AEgyptiacarum ab initiis cultae religionis ad ann. Hegirae, Stockholm, 1698.
