= Old English rune poem =

Poem in Old English about the runic alphabet

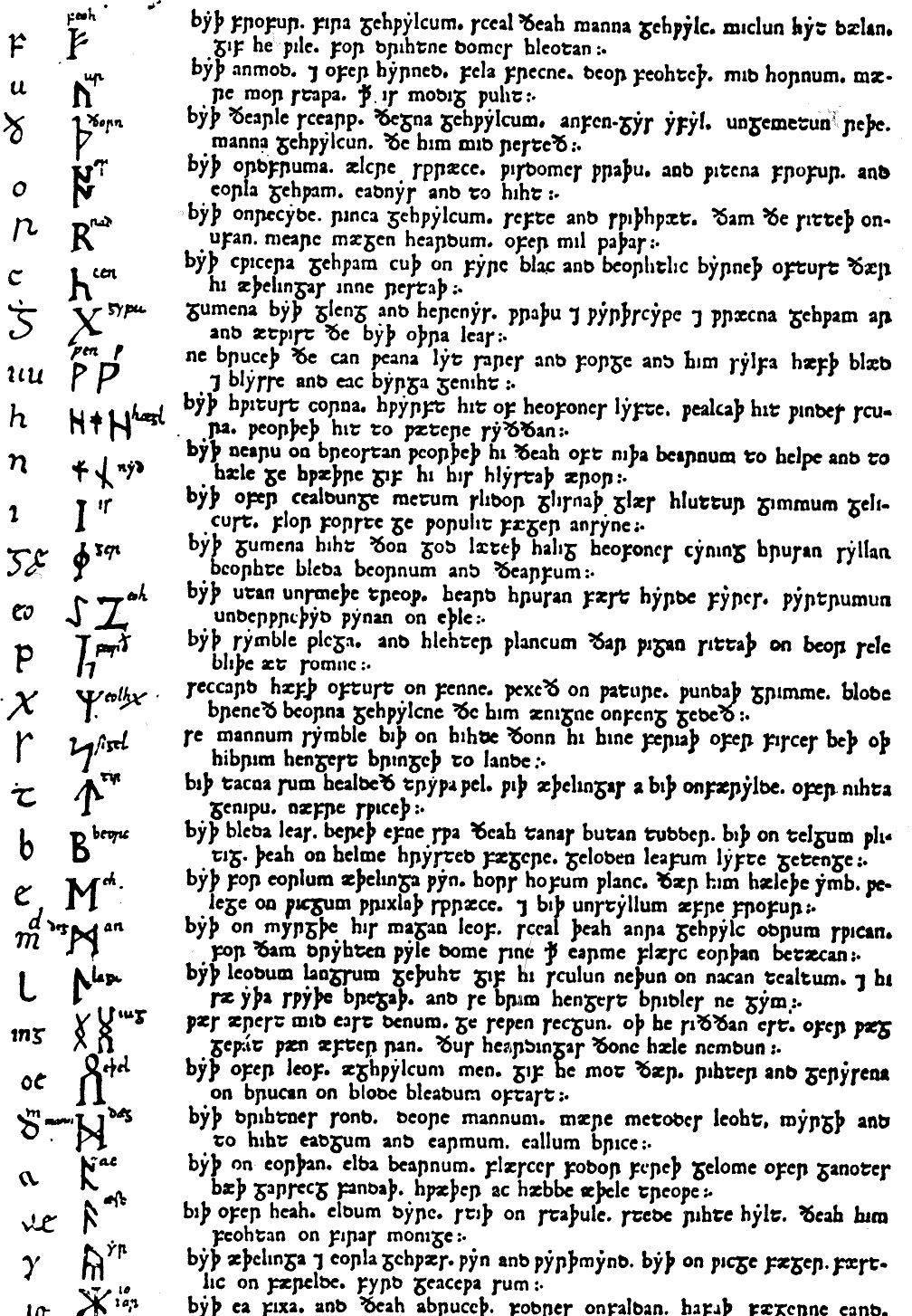
Reproduction of the 1705 copy of the poem made by Humfrey Wanley and published by George Hickes.

The Old English rune poem, dated to the 8th or 9th century, has stanzas on 29 Anglo-Saxon runes. It stands alongside younger rune poems from Scandinavia, which record the names of the 16 Younger Futhark runes.

The poem is a product of the period of declining vitality of the runic script in Anglo-Saxon England after the Christianization of the 7th century. A large body of scholarship has been devoted to the poem, mostly dedicated to its importance for runology but to a lesser extent also to the cultural lore embodied in its stanzas.

The sole manuscript recording the poem, Cotton Otho B.x, was destroyed in the fire at the Cotton library of 1731, and all editions of the poems are based on a facsimile published by George Hickes in 1705.

== History of preservation ==
The poem as recorded was likely composed in the 8th or 9th century. It was preserved in the 10th-century manuscript Cotton Otho B.x, fol. 165a – 165b, housed at the Cotton library in London. The first mention of the manuscript is in the 1621 catalogue of the Cottonian collection (Harley 6018, fol. 162v), as "a Saxon book of divers saints lives and the Alphabett of the old Danish letter amonghs Mr. Gocelins". From this it is inferred that the manuscript had formerly belonged to John Joscelyn (1526–1603).

In 1731, the manuscript was lost with numerous other manuscripts in the fire at the Cotton library. However, the poem had been copied by Humfrey Wanley (1672–1726), and published by George Hickes in his 1705 Linguarum veterum septentrionalium thesaurus. This copy has formed the basis of all later editions of the poems.

The rune poem was presumably recorded on a single sheet of parchment which had not originally been part of the manuscript, and was possibly bound with a manuscript of Aelfric's Lives of Saints by Joscelyn. Consequently, the surviving fragments of the manuscript are of no use in determining the hand or the date of the destroyed folio of the poem. Based on a number of late West Saxon forms in the text, it can be assumed that the manuscript of the rune poem dated to the 10th or 11th century, based on earlier copies by Anglian or Kentish scribes. Although the original dialect and date of the poem cannot be determined with certainty, it was most likely a West Saxon composition predating the 10th century.

George Hickes' record of the poem may deviate from the original manuscript. Hickes recorded the poem in prose, divided the prose into 29 stanzas, and placed a copper plate engraved with runic characters on the left margin so that each rune stands immediately in front of the stanza where it belongs. For five of the runes (ƿen, hægl, nyd, eoh, and ing) Hickes gives variant forms, and two more runes are given at the foot of the column: cƿeorð and an unnamed rune (calc), which are not handled in the poem itself. A second copper plate appears across the foot of the page and contains two more runes: stan and gar. This apparatus is not likely to have been present in the original text of the Cotton manuscript.

== Rune names ==
The rune poem itself does not provide the names of the runes. Rather, each stanza is a riddle, to which the rune name is the solution. But the text in Hickes' 1705 publication is glossed with the name of each rune. It is not certain if these glosses had been present in the manuscript itself, or if they were added by Hickes. According to Wrenn (1932), "Hickes himself was quite candid about his additions when printing the Runic Poem. [...] there can be little doubt that Hickes, as Hempl long ago [1904] suggested, added the marginal rune names and rune values deliberately". Consequently, the Old English rune poem is no independent testimony of these rune names which were borrowed by Hickes from other sources such as Cottonian MS Domitian A.ix 11v. It is, however, the only source which provides context for these names. Jones (1967:8) argues that the additions attributed by Wrenn and Hempl to Hickes were in fact those of Wanley, who originally transcribed the text and presumably arranged it into stanzas.

The sixteen rune names which the poem shares with the Younger Futhark alphabet are as follows:

	f ᚠ	u ᚢ	þ ᚦ	o/ą ᚨᚬ	r ᚱ	c/k ᚳᚴ	h ᚻᚼ	n ᚾ	i ᛁ	j/a ᛄᛅ	s ᛋ	t ᛏ	b ᛒ	m ᛗᛘ	l ᛚ	x/ʀ ᛉᛦ
Old English	Feoh "wealth"	Úr "aurochs"	Þorn "thorn"	Ós "god"	Rád "riding"	Cén "torch"	Hægl "hail"	Nýd "need"	Ís "ice"	Gér "bountiful harvest"	Sigel "sun"	Tír "glory"	Beorc "birch"	Mann "man"	Lagu "sea"	Eolhx (see Algiz
Norwegian	Fé "wealth"	Úr "dross"	Þurs "giant"	Óss "estuary"	Reið "riding"	Kaun "ulcer"	Hagall "hail"	Nauðr "need"	Íss "ice"	Ár "bountiful harvest"	Sól "sun"	Týr	Bjarkan "birch"	Maðr "man"	Lǫgr "waterfall"	Ýr "yew"
Icelandic	Fé "wealth"	Úr "rain"	Þurs "giant"	Áss "pagan god, Odin"	Reið "riding"	Kaun "ulcer"	Hagall "hail"	Nauðr "need"	Íss "ice"	Ár "bountiful harvest"	Sól "sun"	Týr	Bjarkan "birch"	Maðr "man"	Lǫgr "water"	Ýr "yew"

Of these sixteen Old English names, ten are exact cognates of the Scandinavian tradition (Feoh, Rad, Hægl, Nyd, Is, Ger, Sigel, Beorc, Mann, Lagu). In addition, the names of the Ur and Cen runes correspond in form but not in meaning. The name Eolhx is without counterpart as the corresponding Scandinavian rune has inherited the name of the Eoh rune. The names of the two runes recording theonyms are special cases. For the Os rune, the poem suggests Latin os "mouth" only superficially. The poem does not describe a mouth anatomically but the "source of language" and "pillar of wisdom", harking back to the original meaning of ōs "(the) god, Woden/Odin". The Tir rune appears to have adopted the Scandinavian form (Týr, the Anglo-Saxon cognate being Tiƿ). However, tīr exists as a noun in Old English, with a meaning of "glory, fame honour". Bruce Dickens proposed that Tir is a misreading for Tiw (Tiƿ) the Teutonic substitute for the Roman Mars. This would lead to an interpretation of the stanza as referring to the planet Mars, though the stanza itself implies a "circumpolar constellation."

The name of the Old English Þorn rune is thus the only case with no counterpart in Scandinavian tradition, where the corresponding rune is called Þurs.

The good agreement between the Anglo-Saxon and the Scandinavian poems instils confidence that the names recorded in the Anglo-Saxon poem for the eight runes of the Elder Futhark which have been discontinued in the Younger Futhark also reflect their historical names.

g ᚷ	w/ƿ ᚹ	eo ᛇ	p ᛈ	e ᛖ	ng ᛝ	é/œ ᛟ	d ᛞ
Gyfu "gift/giving"	Ƿynn "bliss"	Eoh "yew"	Peorð (?)	Eh "horse"	Ing (a hero)	Éþel "estate"	Dæg "day"

Furthermore, the Anglo-Saxon poem gives the names of five runes which are Anglo-Saxon innovations and have no counterpart in Scandinavian or continental tradition.

a ᚪ	æ ᚫ	y ᚣ	io ᛡ	éa ᛠ
Ác "oak"	Æsc "ash"	Ýr "yew bow"	Ior "eel"(?)	Éar "grave(?)"

== Editions and translations ==
- Bruce Dickins, Runic and heroic poems of the old Teutonic peoples, 1915, pp. 12–23.
- Martin Foys et al., Old English Poetry in Facsimile Project, Madison, 2019.
- Maureen Halsall, The Old English Rune Poem: A Critical Edition, Toronto: U of Toronto P, 1981.
- George Hickes, "Linguarum Veterum Septentrionalium Thesaurus Grammatico-Criticus et Archaeologicus", Oxoniae, 1705. p. 135 in original text, p. 225 in electronic edition.
- F. G. Jones, The Old English Rune Poem, An Edition, University of Florida, 1967.
- Miller Wolf Oberman, From "Old English Rune Poem", 2013
- T.A. Shippey (ed. and tr.) in: Poems of Wisdom and Learning in Old English. Cambridge, 1976, pp. 80–5.
- Vern Tonkin, Letters for Titles: An Alphabet Book, 2022.

== See also ==
- Cynewulf
- List of runestones
