= Odal (SS rune) =

Nazi symbol and SS rune

Winged Odal

Odal or Othala – especially Winged Odal or Winged Othala – is a Nazi symbol and SS rune, used by the Schutzstaffel (SS) paramilitary in Nazi Germany in the 1930s and 1940s. It symbolized several values of central importance to Nazi ideology, such as kinship, family, and blood ties. It's based on the historical rune of the same name, reconsutructed as *Ōþala (ᛟ) (cf. Old English: Ēþel, Old Norse: óðal), a writing character of the late Iron Age Germanic peoples (probably stemming from Omega (Ω)), but often modified with serifs, or "wings" (also called "feet", "hooks", "heels", etc.).

During World War II, it was used by – among others – volunteer formations such as the 7th SS Volunteer Mountain Division Prinz Eugen, as well as the SS Race and Settlement Main Office, which was responsible for maintaining the racial purity of the SS.

In the 21st century, it sees continued use among Neo-Nazis and similar far-right groups.

== Origin ==
The Nazi-use of runic symbology was largely derived from the Armanen runes, a collection of occult pseudo-runes, borrowed from the Younger Futhark, by Austrian mysticist and Germanic revivalist Guido von List, in the 1920s. Due to Younger Futhark being Norse (Nordic) in root, nationalistic German occultists later turned to the collective Germanic Elder Futhark to derive from, of which Othala (ᛟ) is part of.

== Usage ==
=== Usage by Nazi Germany ===
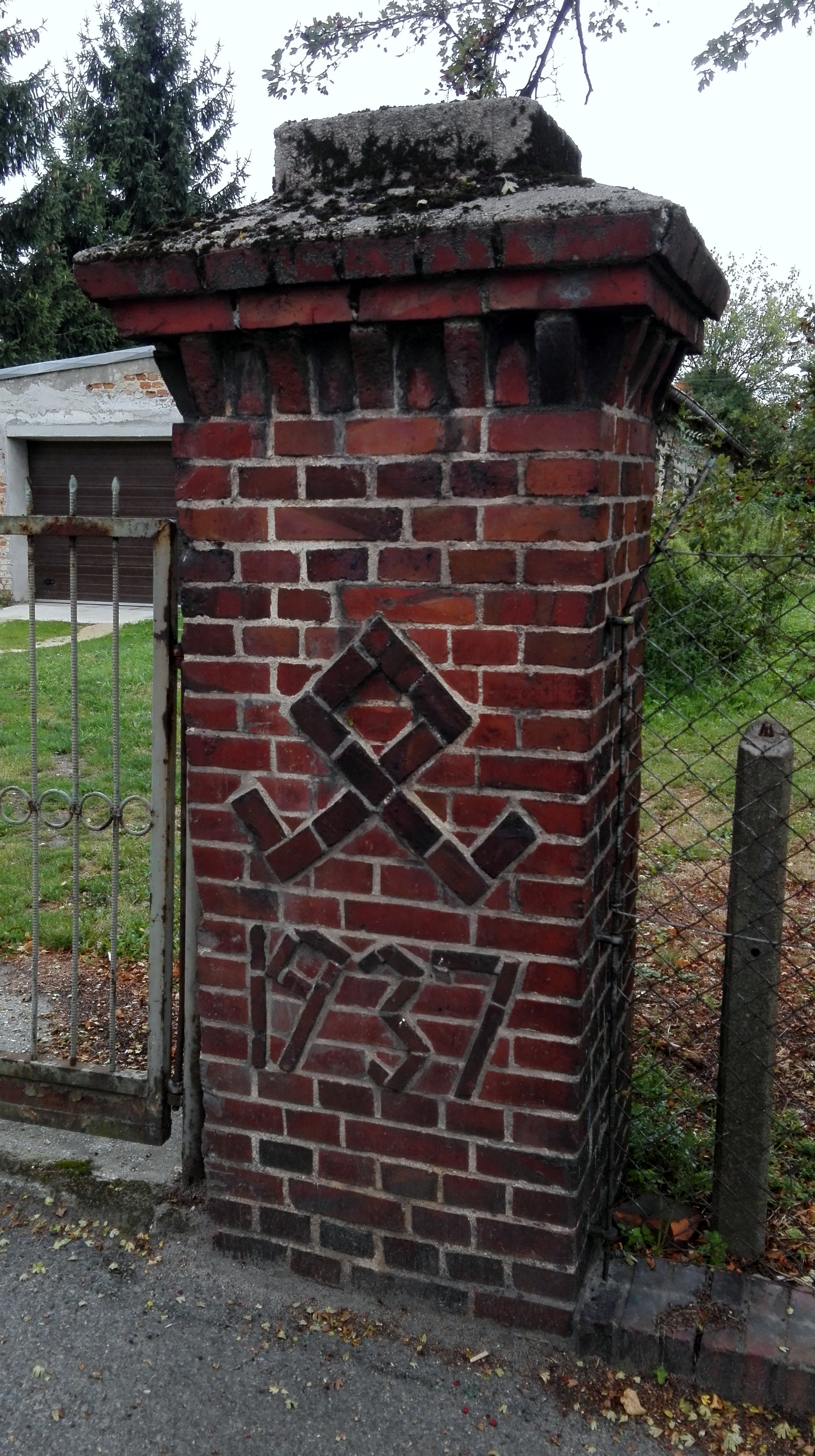
1937 pillar with Odal in Prudnik, Poland (pre-1945 Germany)

The Odal was adopted by the Schutzstaffel (SS), along with other similar symbols, for esoteric symbology of Aryan superiority. Odal then became the badge of the SS Race and Settlement Main Office, which was responsible for maintaining the racial purity of the SS. It was also the emblem of Volksdeutsche (ethnic Germans) of the 7th SS Volunteer Mountain Division Prinz Eugen operating during World War II in the Nazi Germany-sponsored Independent State of Croatia. The Volunteer Legion Netherlands used a variant with arrows instead of wings.

Examples of usage
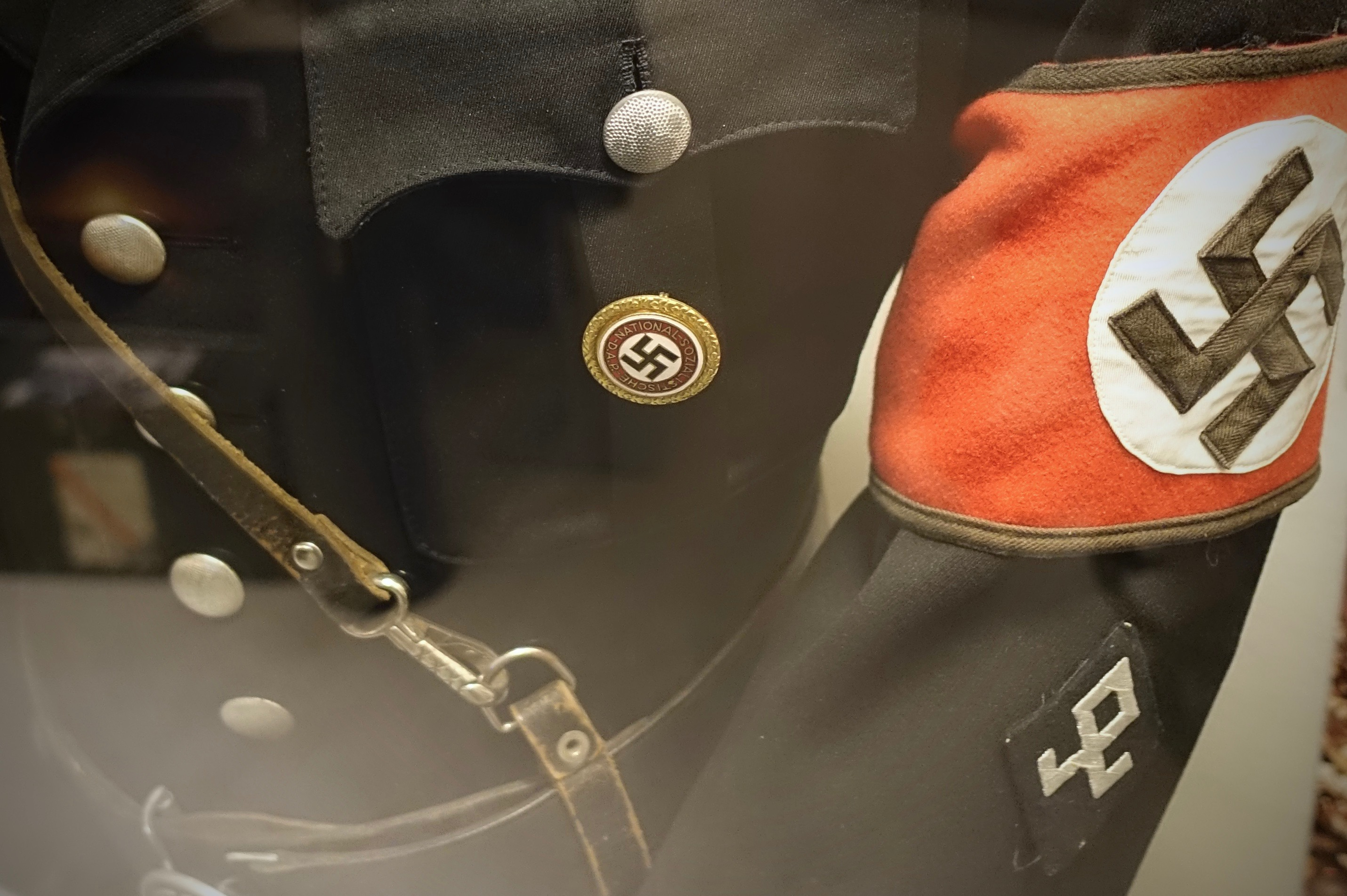
Allgemeine SS uniform with Odal diamond sleeve patch (bottom right)

Insignia of the 7th SS Volunteer Mountain Division Prinz Eugen

Emblem of the Waffen-SS- Volunteer Legion Netherlands

Flag of the Croatian Volksdeutsche

Flag of the French National Popular Rally

Flag used by the Boeremag in South Africa

=== Modern usage ===
Odal SS-rune without "wings" on flag of the Neo-Nazi Wiking-Jugend

Neo-Nazis and similar far-right collectives have continued the use of the symbol into modern times, sometimes with wings and sometimes without; its symbology varies.

Users include: the Neo-Nazi Wiking-Jugend in Germany, and in South Africa by the Anglo-Afrikaner Bond, the Boeremag, the Blanke Bevrydingsbeweging, the Italian neo-fascist group National Vanguard, the Afrikaner Studente Front and the far-right White Liberation Movement before it was disbanded.

Flag of the National Socialist Movement (2016–2019)

In November 2016, the leadership of the National Socialist Movement announced their intention to replace the Nazi-pattern swastika with the othala rune on their uniforms and party regalia in an attempt to enter mainstream politics. The rune was further used, along with other traditional symbols from European cultures such as a Tiwaz rune and a Celtic cross, and slogans associated with Nazism and far-right extremism by the Christchurch mosque shooter Brenton Harrison Tarrant. Heathen Front was a Neo-Nazi group, active during the 1990s to 2005 that espoused a racist form of Heathenry and described its ideas as odalism in reference to the alternative name for othala. In 2019, the group reverted to using the swastika as their logo.

==== Modern symbology ====
While some use the symbol under its original meaning of "kinship, family and blood ties", others have modified it to suit their agenda.

White supremacists who use the rune often claim it symbolises the heritage or land of "white" or "Aryan" people which should be free from foreigners. It has been noted however that this usage is a new invention by the groups and is not attested in any source from before the modern period, being labelled by runologist Michael Barnes as "spring[ing] entirely from the imagination".

== Alleged use ==
In some cases, individuals and organisations have been accused of using the rune as a far-right symbol, such as in April 2014 when the British Topman clothing company apologised after using it in one of their clothing lines. Furthermore, at the Conservative Political Action Conference (CPAC) held in Orlando, Florida, on February 25–28, 2021, the floor layout of the main stage resembled the winged form of the othala rune, leading to speculation on social media as to why that design was chosen. CPAC chairman Matt Schlapp said comparisons were "outrageous and slanderous". Design firm Design Foundry later took responsibility for the design of the stage, saying that it "intended to provide the best use of space, given the constraints of the ballroom and social distancing requirements." Ian Walters, director of communications for the ACU and CPAC, said they would stop using Design Foundry.

The neo-folk group Death in June used othala on the cover of their 7'' Come Before Christ And Murder Love alongside their "Totenkopf 6" logo. The group does not openly support far-right ideologies however scholars have noted the group's fascination with Nazism and extensive usage of Nazi, and more widely fascist, imagery.

== Sources ==
- Barnes, Michael P. (2022). Runes: a handbook (paperback ed.). Woodbridge Rochester, NY: the Boydell press. ISBN 9781783276974.
- Bogdan, Henrik; Hammer, Olav, eds. (2016). Western Esotericism in Scandinavia. BRILL. pp. 384, 621. ISBN 9789004325968.
- "Death In June - Come Before Christ And Murder Love". Discogs. 1985.
- Heilbronner, Oded (2015). "The Wewelsburg Effect: Nazi Myth and Paganism in Postwar European Popular Music". Revisiting the "Nazi Occult": Histories, Realities, Legacies. German History in Context. Boydell & Brewer: 270–286. doi:10.1017/9781782046080.013. ISBN 9781782046080.
- Ibrahim, Nur Nasreen (2021-03-03). "Was the CPAC Stage Intentionally Shaped Like a Nazi Symbol?". snopes.com. [Verdict: "Mixture". The resemblance was clear, the intention undetermined by documentation but denied.]
