= Fragmentum Runico-Papisticum =

- Mariaklagan
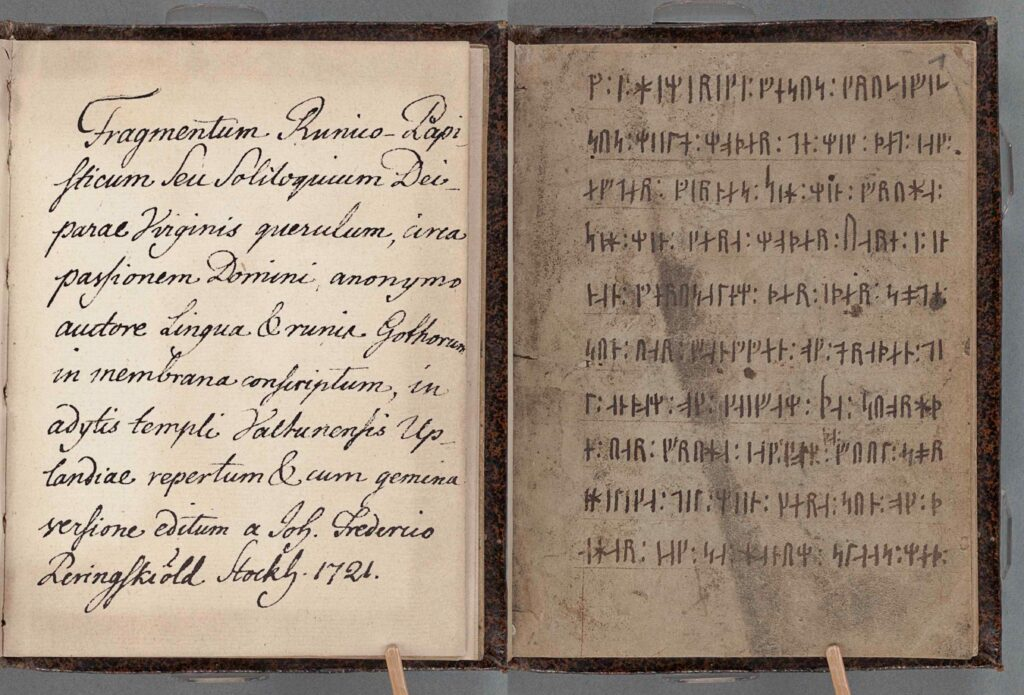
- First page (right)
- Material: Parchments
- Writing: Medieval Runic
- Created: 14th–15th century
- Discovered: ca 1700; Vallentuna Church, Sweden
- Discovered by: Johan Peringskiöld
- Present location: National Library of Sweden
- Rundata ID: SKB A 120, Mariaklagan
- Style: East Norse

Text – Native
- Old Danish/Old Scanian

Fragmentum Runico-Papisticum ('runic-papist fragment' in Latin) or Mary's Lament (Swedish: Marias klagan, or Mariaklagan, lit. 'Mary-lament') is an Old Danish/Old Scanian Medieval Runic text, written in the 14th–15th century. It is one of the longest pre-modern runic texts to survive, only second to the Codex Runicus.

The text was found around the year 1700 by Swedish antiquarian Johan Peringskiöld, found as six parchments at Vallentuna Church, Sweden. It was published in 1721 by his son and successor Johan Fredrik Peringskiöld under the title "Fragmentum Runicum-Papisticum".

It is assumed to be a translation of a German work, as this type of text was very popular in Germany during the Middle Ages. However, it is not known when and how the manuscript ended up in Vallentuna in Sweden.

== Gallery ==
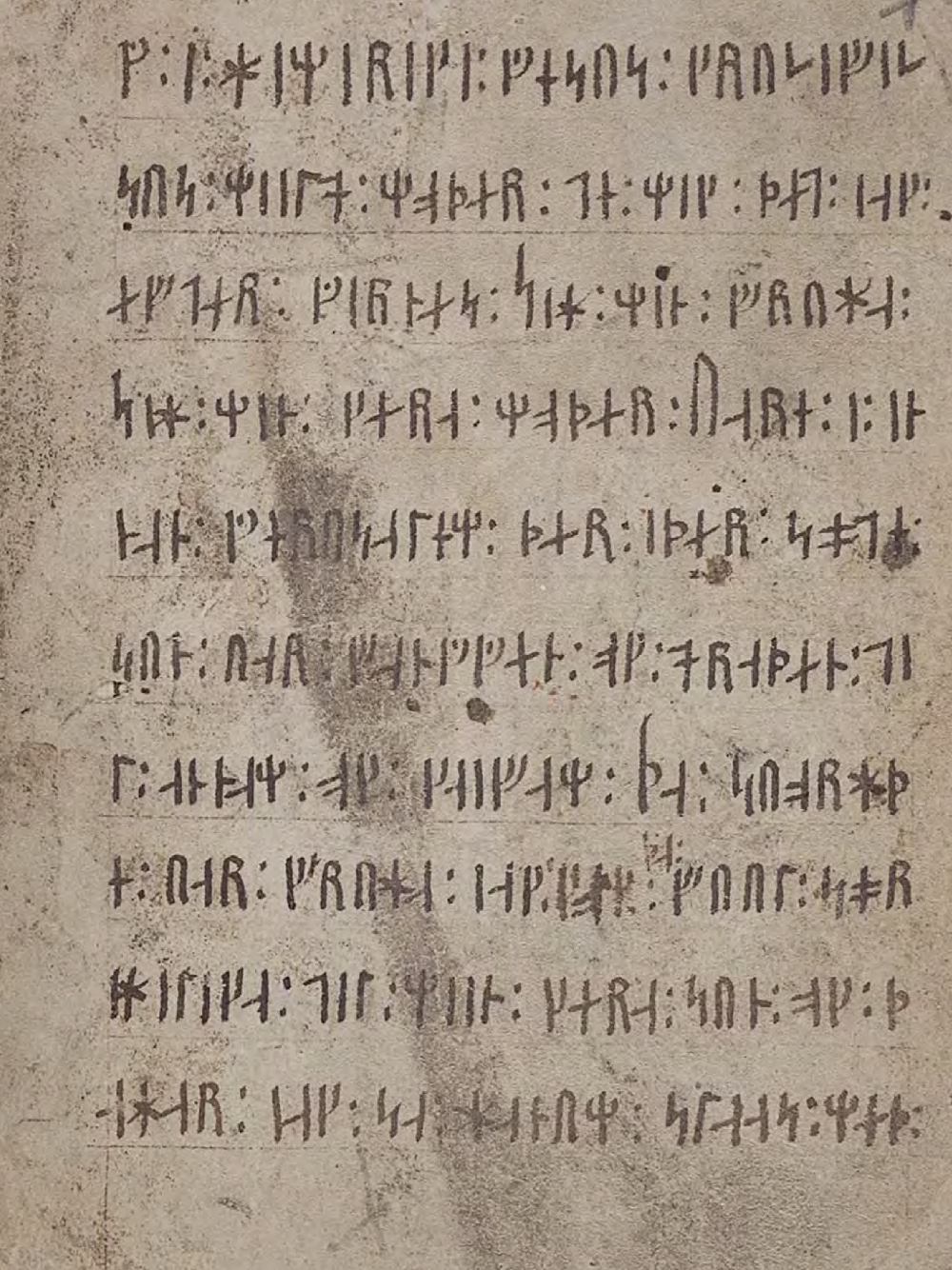
Page 1/12

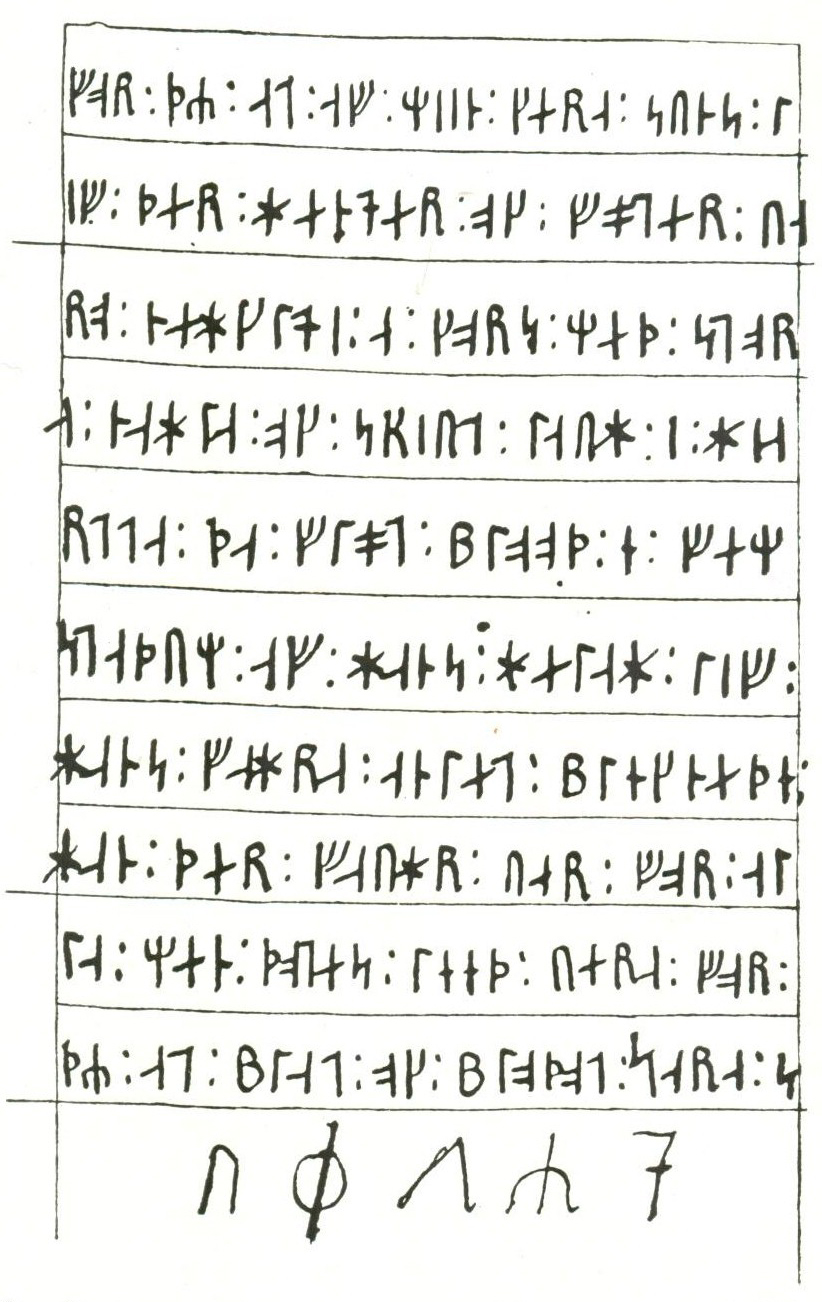
Page 6/12
