= Dagaz =

Runic character

Name	Proto-Germanic	Old English
Name	*Dagaz	Dæg
Shape	Elder Futhark	Futhorc
Unicode	ᛞ U+16DE	
Transliteration	d	
Transcription	d	
IPA	[ð]	[d]
Position in rune-row	23 or 24	

The d rune (ᛞ) is called dæg "day" in the Anglo-Saxon rune poem. The corresponding letter of the Gothic alphabet 𐌳 d is called dags. This rune is also part of the Elder Futhark, with a reconstructed Proto-Germanic name *dagaz.

Its "butterfly" shape is possibly derived from Lepontic san. The rune may have been an original innovation, or it may have been adapted from the Rhaetic's alphabet's D.

== Rune poems ==
The name is only recorded in the Anglo-Saxon rune poem, since the rune was lost in the Younger Futhark:

Rune Poem:	English Translation:
Old English ᛞ Dæg bẏþ drihtnes sond, deore mannum, mære metodes leoht, mẏrgþ and tohiht eadgum and earmum, eallum brice.	Day, the glorious light of the Creator, is sent by the Lord; it is beloved of men, a source of hope and happiness to rich and poor, and of service to all.

== Inscriptions ==
On runic inscription Ög 43 in Ingelstad, one Dagaz rune is translated using the Old Norse word for "day" as the personal name Dagr.

== See also ==
- Dagr
