= Henric Trenk =

Swiss-born Romanian painter and graphic artist

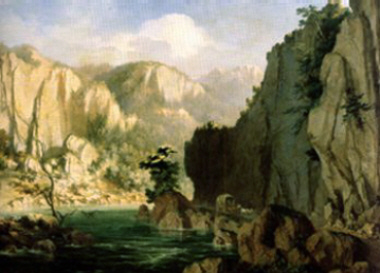
- The Olt River at Cârlige (1868)
- Born: 1818; Zug, Switzerland
- Died: July 5, 1892 (aged 73–74); Bucharest, Kingdom of Romania
- Known for: painting, illustration
- Movement: Romanticism
- Patrons: Alexandru Odobescu

Henric Trenk (also known as Henri or Heinrich Trenk; 1818–5 July 1892) was a Swiss-born Romanian painter and graphic artist, best known for his Romantic landscapes and his association with writer and amateur archaeologist Alexandru Odobescu.

== Biography ==
Born to an ethnic German family in Zug, Trenk studied at the Kunstakademie in Düsseldorf, in the Kingdom of Prussia's Rhine Province. He first arrived in the Austrian-ruled region of Transylvania around 1846, and moved to Wallachia in 1851. He remained in Wallachia as it became a constituent part of the Romanian Kingdom, and never again left its territory. Later in life, Trenk was naturalized a Romanian.

He came to associate with Odobescu, and was appointed by the latter official illustrator of the magazines printed by the Romanian Commission of Historical Monuments. Trenk traveled throughout the regions of Muntenia and Oltenia, creating a large number of oil paintings featuring rural scenes, historical relics, and natural scenes—including several depictions of the Olt River near the Cozia Monastery. For a while, he taught drawing at a Bucharest gymnasium, and had the major Romanian painter Ion Andreescu among his students.

== Work ==
With support from Odobescu, who was attempting to build a record of historical locations and folklore, Henric Trenk documented places of interest, as well as genre scenes in the Wallachian Plain—fairs, inns, lodgings, as well as more exotic portrayals of Roma people and the distinctively-dressed Romanian postilions. While admired for their exactitude (unprecedented in Romanian art), these works have drawn criticism for their impersonality.

Among his most distinctive works is a mountainous landscape of the Olt at the meanders of Cozia (known locally as Cârlige, "Hooks"), which was attributed by some to his nostalgia for the Alpine landscape. A similar feeling motivation was deduced from his earlier paintings, the Romantic picturesque landscapes showing the Southern Carpathian areas of Transylvania.

Trenk was also active in research towards improving the paint used in fine arts, publishing in several chemistry journals. His aim was to find a paint which would be durable, but also matte, avoiding distracting reflections on the painting's surface. His successful invention of such a paint was announced in a February 1869 note by Carol Szathmari, court painter of Domnitor Carol I of Romania.

== Gallery ==
Click on an image to view it enlarged.

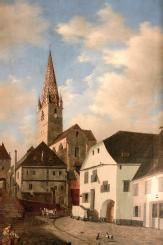
Evangelical Church in Sibiu

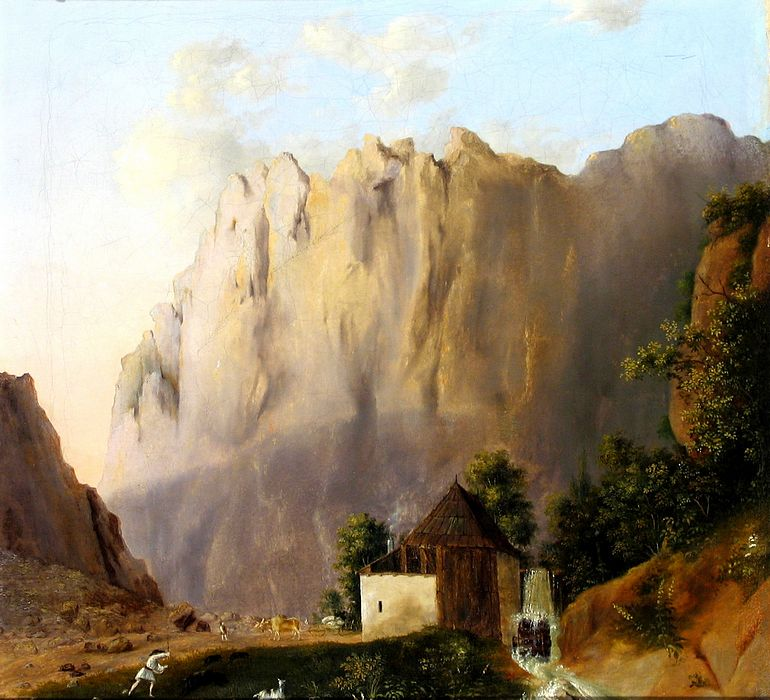
The Entrance to Cheile Turzii

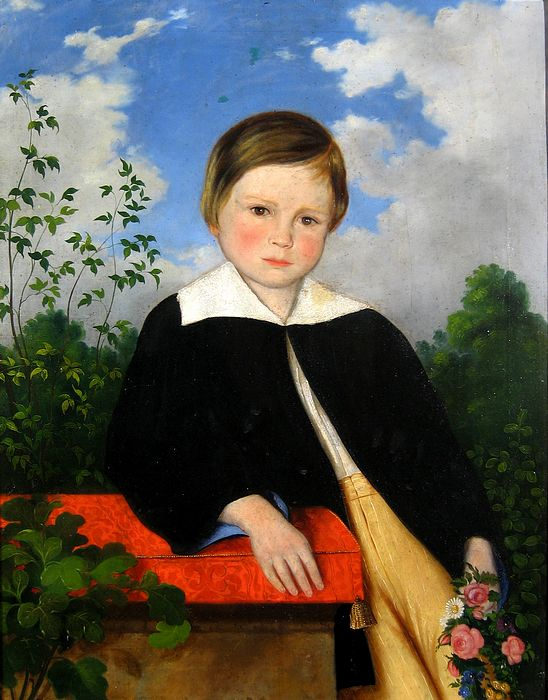
Julius Sigerus as a Child, Brukenthal National Museum

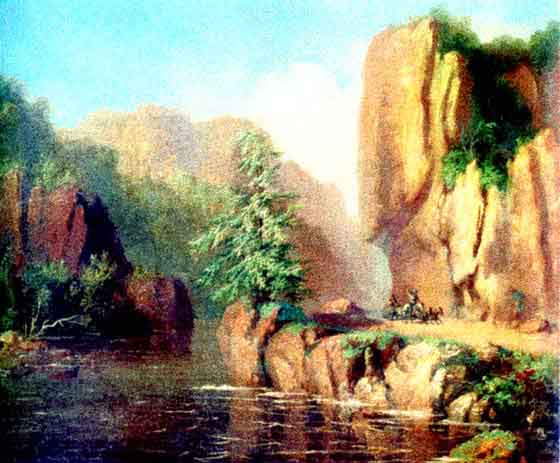
Mountainous Landscape

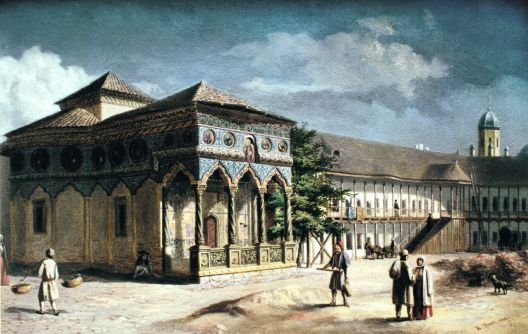
Stavropoleos Church

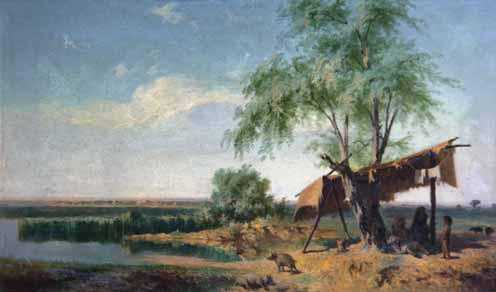
Lake Căldăruşani

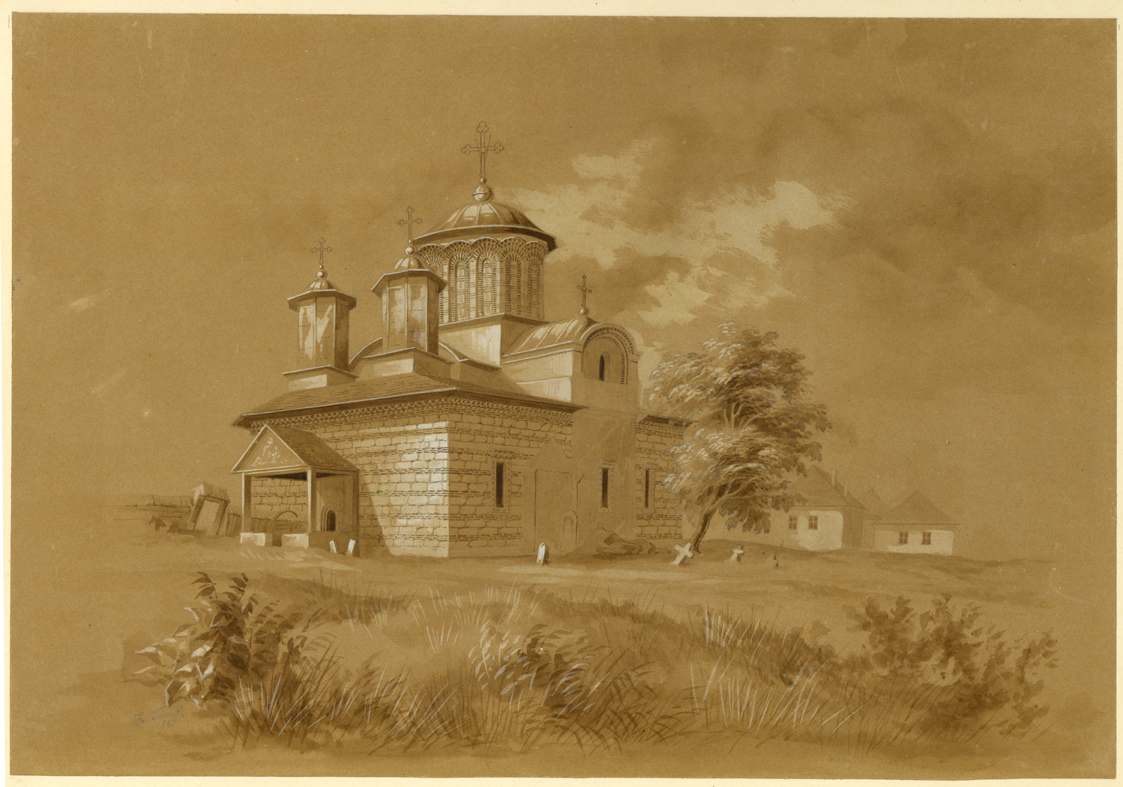
Royal Church in Curtea de Argeș

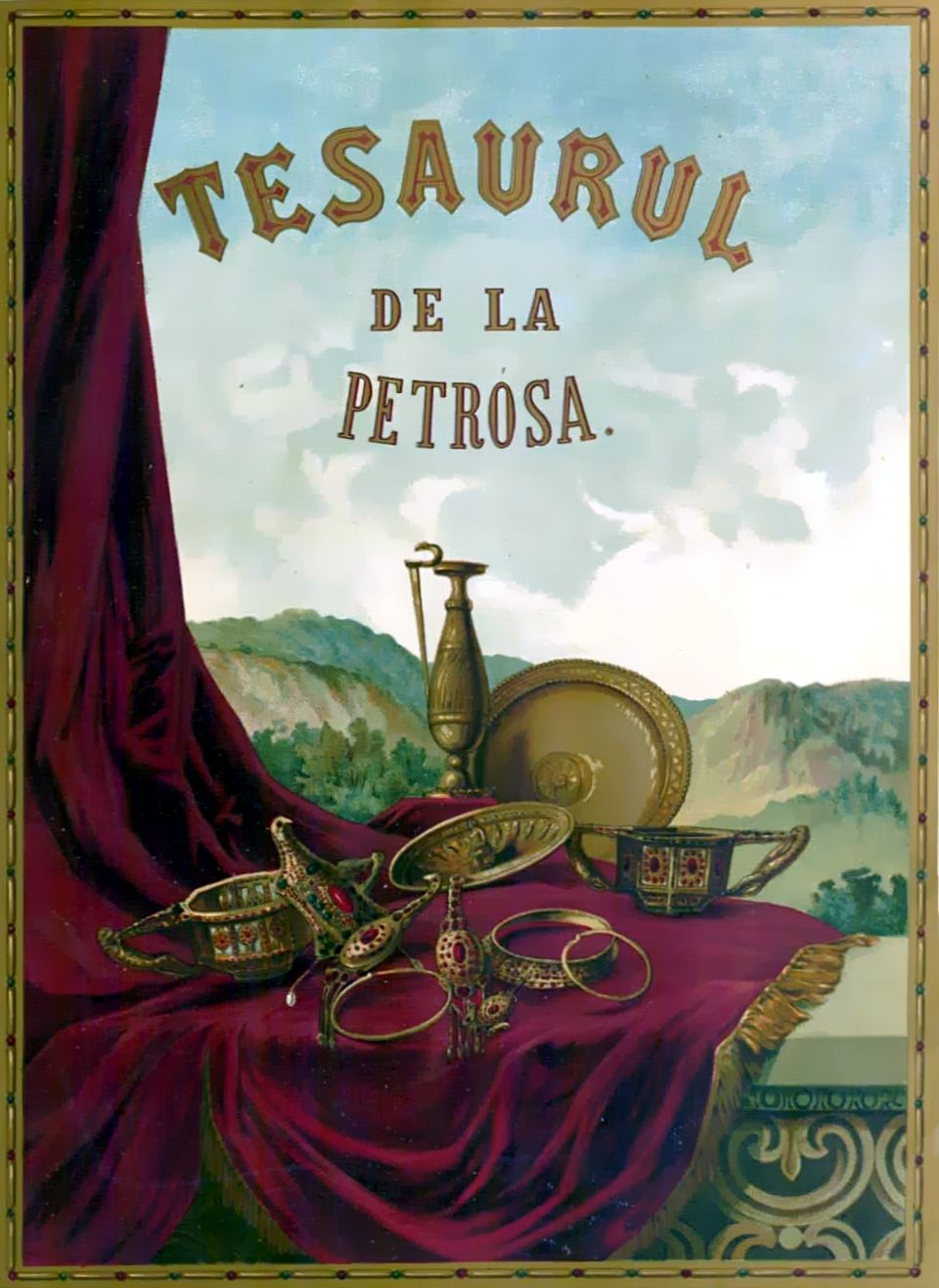
Pietroasele Treasure
