= Roma wall =

Czech, Romanian, and Slovakian walls for segregation

A Roma wall or Gypsy wall is a wall built by local authorities in the Czech Republic, Romania and Slovakia to segregate the Roma minority from the rest of the population. Such practices have been criticised by both human rights organizations and the European Union, who see it as a case of racial segregation.

== Czech Republic ==
A 2-metre high, 65-metre long wall along Matiční street was built in the city of Ústí nad Labem in 1999 following complaints of the locals that the Roma were "noisy and unhygienic".

Foreign journalists travelled to Ústí nad Labem to investigate, and were told by councillors that the wall was not meant to segregate by race, but to keep respectable citizens safe from noise and rubbish coming from the opposite side of the street. The local authorities also argued that it will keep the Roma children from running into the street and that it's part of an "urban renewal programme".

The Roma Civic Initiative and Deputy Prime Minister Vladimír Špidla vocally opposed the construction. The wall was also criticised by U.S. Congressman Chris Smith, and a delegation from the Council of Europe described it as a "racist" and drastic solution. The European Union Commissioner Günter Verheugen called it "a violation of human rights". The Czech Republic promised that it would be torn down, and it was demolished on 24 November 1999. The government provided the local authorities money for social welfare programmes, but much of the money was used for buying the houses of the non-Roma residents, thus creating a local Roma-only "ghetto".

In April 2000, the Constitutional Court of the Czech Republic ruled that the MPs exceeded their legal powers when they ordered the demolition of the wall, as this was a matter of local self-government.

The fence from Matiční Street was then used to separate Ústí nad Labem Zoo from Drážďanská Street, which it still serves today.

== Romania ==
In Baia Mare, Romania, the local administration built a wall between the road Strada Horea and an area of social housing that houses 1000 Roma people into one-room apartments, some without water or electricity. According to the mayor, this wall was designed to "prevent traffic accidents", while pro-democracy organizations say it amounts to "institutionalized racism".

In 2011, the national anti-discrimination council fined mayor Cătălin Cherecheș for the building of the wall and ordered it to be pulled down.

The wall nevertheless proved popular with the majority population and the mayor was overwhelmingly re-elected in 2012.

== Slovakia ==
=== Ostrovany ===
In Ostrovany, a 150-metre long wall was built by the local government separating the Roma from the rest of the population. According to the mayor, the goal was to "stop vandalism and theft". Slovaks accuse the Roma of stealing their fruit, vegetables and metal fence posts. Unlike in other cases, in Ostrovany, the Roma form the majority of the population (1200 of the 1786 residents), making it even more unjust, according to critics, who argue that separating people is not a solution to social problems.

=== Košice ===
A wall was built in the summer of 2013 in the Košice-Západ district of Košice. Androulla Vassiliou, the European Commissioner for Education, Culture, Multilingualism and Youth complained about the wall arguing that it "violates the EU's stand against racism" by segregating the Roma people and it is at odds with the concept of European Capital of Culture, which the town bears this year. The mayor of Košice, Richard Raši, called the wall illegally built without the necessary permits and pledged its demolition.

=== Other walls ===
In 2013, there were 14 Roma walls in Slovakia, of which 8 in the Košice and Prešov regions, have the highest Roma populations. The local authorities decide for building such walls and they usually state a different reason than the Roma people.
