= Romanian Treasure =

Collection of valuables sent to Russia during World War I

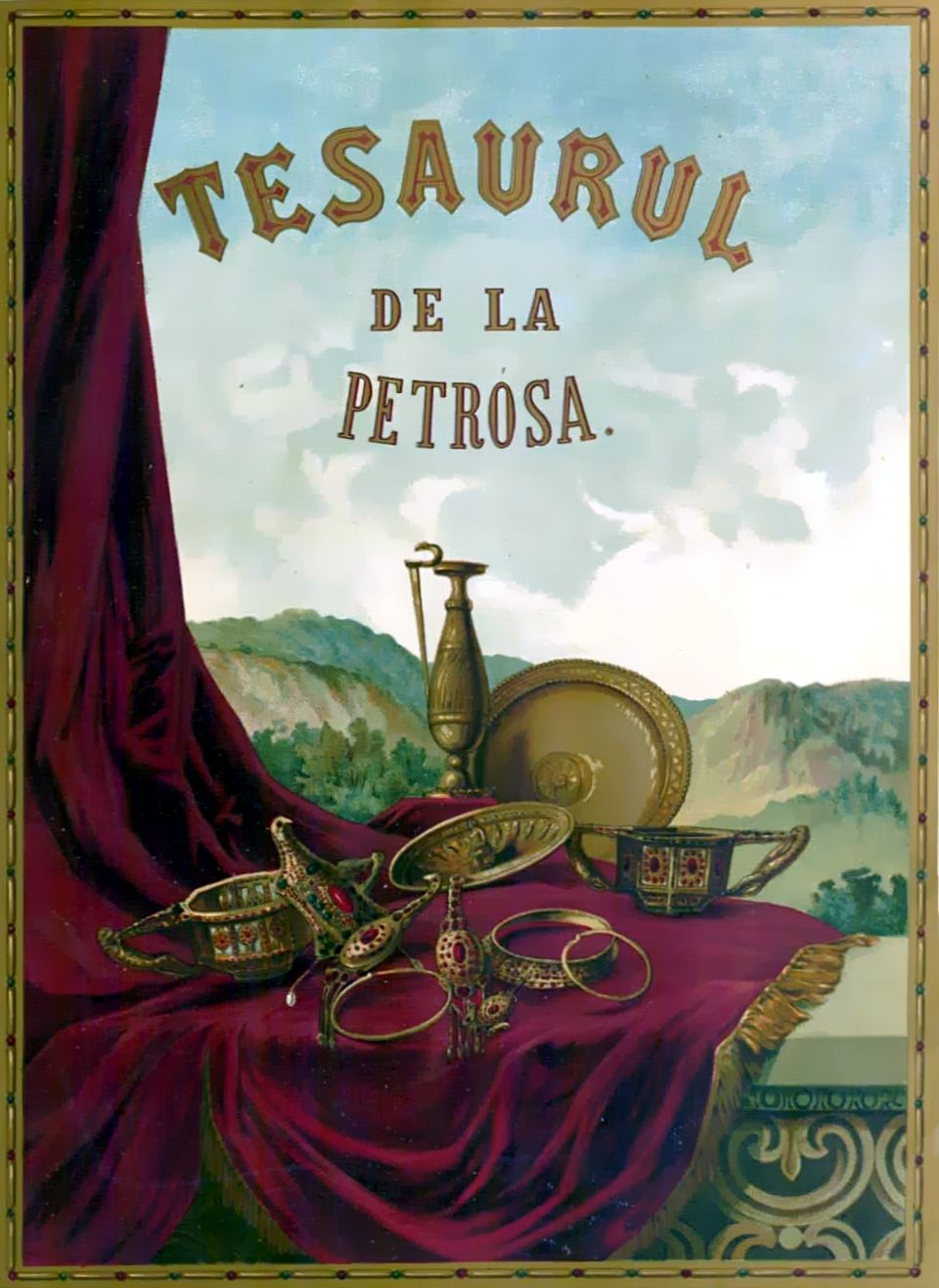
Pietroasele Treasure

The Romanian Treasure (Romanian: Tezaurul României) is a collection of valuable objects and the gold reserves (~120 tonnes) that the Romanian government sent to Tsarist Russia for safekeeping during World War I, with the aim of being sheltered from the armies of the Central Powers, which had occupied a significant part of Romania and threatened to occupy the entire national territory. After the Romanian Army entered Bessarabia, at the time part of the Russian Empire, in early 1918, the new Soviet government that managed to rule Russia severed all diplomatic relations and confiscated the Romanian Treasure. As of today, only part of the objects and none of the gold reserves have been returned.

After the October Revolution and the seizure of power by the Communists under Lenin's leadership, the newly installed Soviet power sequestered the treasure and refused its restitution. It was partially returned, in three separate tranches, in 1935, 1956, and 2008, as a gesture of goodwill from the Soviets and later from the Russians. However, the majority of the treasure remained unrestituted, which makes it a sensitive subject in diplomatic relations between Romania and Russia.

== Historical background ==
In August 1916, Romania made the decision to enter the war alongside the Entente. Although the campaign started favorably with Romanian troops advancing into Transylvania, soon after, German, Austro-Hungarian, and Bulgarian forces took the initiative, occupying Dobruja, Oltenia, and Muntenia in the fall of the same year.

Romania's administration was forced to move the country's capital from Bucharest to Iași and organize resistance against the invaders in Moldavia. Against this backdrop, in November, it was decided to relocate the headquarters of the National Bank of Romania, an occasion during which its treasure was also transported to Iași. The main asset included in the treasure was a quantity of 93.4 tons of gold, consisting of 91 tons of historical gold coins and 2.4 tons of gold ingots. According to the conventions applicable at that time, gold served to guarantee the issuance of Romanian lei. The 91 tons of gold coins belonged to private Romanian banks, existing on the Romanian market at that time, private firms, and individuals, while the 2.4 tons of gold ingots belonged exclusively to the National Bank of Romania. The Russians requested that protocols for handover/receipt not be signed with multiple banks, companies, and individuals in Romania, but only one protocol with the National Bank of Romania, with the BNR collecting all these valuables from each Romanian entity separately.

At that time, the National Bank of Romania was entirely a private bank, with no involvement from the Romanian state. In early December 1916, the defense front had not yet stabilized, and there was serious consideration of evacuating the government across the Prut river into Russia. On December 2, the General Council of the BNR approved in principle the possibility of safeguarding the treasure in Russia, a view that, by December 8, was also supported by the government, voiced by Finance Minister Emil Costinescu, who mentioned, among other things, the precedent set by the Bank of France (which had decided to transfer its treasure to the United States). Costinescu also mentioned the option of transferring the treasure to London but considered the route too dangerous, given the additional threat posed by German submarines. Therefore, the preferred solution was to deposit the treasure together with the treasure of the Tsarist Empire at the Kremlin.

The decision had to be taken by the Romanian Prime Minister Ion I. C. Brătianu. Although the banker Mauriciu Blank advised him to send it to London or to a neutral country, such as Denmark, Brătianu feared the German submarines of the North Sea and chose another ally of Romania in World War I, the Russian Empire, using the argument that "Russia would feel offended if we sent it to England".

On December 12, 1916, the Council of Ministers approved the transfer of the treasure to Russia, after the Russian minister in Iași, General A. Mossoloff, communicated on December 11 that he was authorized to sign the protocol regarding the loading of the BNR treasure onto a special train, adding that the imperial Russian government guaranteed its integrity both during transportation and during its stay in Moscow. The protocol, which provided for the handover of the gold treasure to the delegates of the imperial Russian government, was signed in Iași on December 14/27, 1916.

The treasure destined for Moscow included three main categories of valuables:

1. Documents, manuscripts, ancient coins, paintings, rare books, treasures from monasteries in Moldavia and Muntenia, archives, deposits, collections of many public and private institutions;
2. Public securities and other valuables (such as stocks, bonds, credit titles, pledges to the Mount of Piety, etc.);
3. A quantity of 93.4 tons of gold (91 tons of historical gold coins, belonging to private individuals, companies, and private banks in Romania, and 2.4 tons of gold bars, belonging to the National Bank of Romania); the value of this metallic stock, never returned.

As a side note, during World War II, the valuables of the National Bank of Romania were not transported outside of Romania, but hidden inside a cave near Tismana, Gorj County, and from there, they were safely recovered after the war.

== The composition of Romania's Treasure ==
The list of exhibits owned by the National Museum of Antiquities, which were taken to Moscow in 1916, is as follows:

- Pietroasele Treasure
- Treasure from Turnu Măgurele
- Silver rhyton from Poroina, Mehedinți County
- Four plates with barbarian gold jewelry
- Epitaph from Cozia Monastery (1396)
- Epitaph from Dobrovăț Monastery (1506)
- Epitaph from Slatina Monastery (1556)
- Epitaph from Bistrița Monastery (1601)
- Epitaph from Preda Buzescu, Great Ban of Craiova
- Epitaph from 1683 ( Șerban Vodă Cantacuzino)
- Carpet from Bistrița Monastery (1514)
- Carpet from Bistrița Monastery (16th century)
- Carpet from Bistrița Monastery (16th century)
- Epitaph from Govora Monastery, Radu the Great's era
- Epitaph from Bistrița Monastery, 1521, Barbu, Ban of Craiova
- Epitaph from Dobrovăț Monastery, from Stephen the Great
- Epitaph from Constantin Brâncoveanu's era
- Epitaph from Șerban Cantacuzino's era (two pieces)
- Rucavițe from Cotroceni (a pair)
- Rucavițe from Constantin Brâncoveanu's era
- Rucavițe from Ștefan the Great's era
- Sfita from Cozia Monastery, tradition says it belonged to Mircea the Elder's mantle
- Silver candlestick from Tismana Monastery (14th century)
- Silver candlesticks from Bistrița Monastery (16th century) (two pieces)
- Silver candlestick from Alexandru Lăpușneanu's era
- Silver candlestick from the 15th/16th century
- Shackle from Bistrița Monastery (16th century)
- Shackle from Tismana Monastery
- Gilded silver ripples from Cotroceni Monastery, two pieces (1675)
- Silver disc from Bistrița Monastery (16th century)
- Large silver taler from Tismana Monastery (> 1512)
- Gilded silver engolpion from Snagov Monastery (1431)
- Gilded silver engolpion of the Craiovești brothers from Tismana Monastery
- Gilded silver engolpion from Bistrița Monastery (1512)
- Gilded silver cauș inlaid with ancient coins from Tismana Monastery (1649)
- Gilded silver cauș inlaid with ancient coins from Tismana Monastery, of the clucer Buzinca (1641)
- Four gilded silver crosses from Șerban Cantacuzino's era
- Large cypress wood cross from Slatina Monastery
- Silver disc from the 16th century
- Slavonic Gospel, manuscript from 1405 from Tismana Monastery
- Slavonic Gospel, manuscript from 1502
- Two Slavonic Gospels, printed

== The transfer of the treasure to Russia ==
=== The first transport ===
Between December 12th and 14th, 1916, at the Iași train station, a total of 1,738 boxes were loaded into 17 train cars, containing stored gold in the form of various ingots and coins (mostly German marks and Austrian crowns), with a total value of 314,580,456.84 Lei in gold. Additionally, two boxes containing Queen Maria's jewels, valued at 7,000,000 Lei in gold, were added. Upon completion of the loading operations, a Protocol was signed in three copies, one for the Russian side, one for the Romanian Ministry of Finance, and one for the National Bank.

The transport departed immediately and arrived in Moscow on December 21st, 1916. Delegated from the National Bank to accompany the transport were director Theodor Capitanovici (who was also tasked with remaining in Moscow and keeping two of the keys to the compartment where the valuables were to be deposited), censor A. Saligny, and central cashier M.Z. Dumitrescu.

Romanian and Russian delegates began inventorying the contents of the boxes on January 9th, 1917, an operation that lasted until February 4th, and on February 16th, a final protocol was drafted on this matter, signed by representatives of the Russian Ministry of Finance and Romanian delegates, along with the Romanian consul in Moscow, P. Guerin. The boxes containing the treasure were sealed, and representatives of the National Bank had the right to inspect the compartment where they were stored at any time, with the restitution of the valuables to be carried out by designated National Bank delegates specially appointed for this purpose.

=== The second transport ===
At the beginning of 1917, the Russian Revolution erupted in Petrograd, marking the beginning of the major social movements in Russia that year, culminating in the October Revolution and the seizure of power by the Bolsheviks. Although the front in Moldavia had been stabilized, Romanian political authorities were still concerned about the possibility of the German armies breaking through the front and the country's ultimate defeat. Evacuating the government to Russia, either to Poltava or Herson in Crimea, where preparations were already underway for the installation of the royal family and ministers, was being considered.

On July 18th, 1917, the Council of Ministers decided, at the proposal of Nicolae Titulescu, who was then the Minister of Finance, to relocate the headquarters and assets of the National Bank to Russia. Preparations were made for transporting the assets of the National Bank to Russia, as well as those belonging to the CEC Bank and other public and private institutions. The loading of the train containing the new transport took place between July 23rd and 27th, 1917, and the train departed for Russia in the evening of the same day.

The train had 24 cars, three of which represented the assets of the National Bank, with a declared value of 1,594,836,721.09 Lei, including actual gold valued at 574,523.57 Lei, archives valued at 500,000 Lei, and the rest representing securities, bonds, deposits, and other assets. The CEC Bank's assets occupied 21 cars, comprising 1,661 boxes, estimated to contain around 7.5 billion Lei worth. The most precious objects of the Romanian state were sent, including the archives of the Romanian Academy, many antique valuables, such as 3,500-year-old golden jewels found in Romania, ancient Dacian jewels, the jewels of the voivodes of Wallachia and Moldavia, as well as the jewels of the Romanian royalty, thousands of paintings, as well as precious religious objects owned by Romanian monasteries, such as 14th century icons and old Romanian manuscripts.

The train arrived in Moscow on August 3rd, 1917, with the transport being guarded by the Russian side. Representatives of the following institutions supervised the transport from the Romanian side: the National Bank, the CEC Bank, the Credit Bank, Marmorosch Blank Bank, the Commercial Bank, and the Discount Bank. The assets of the National Bank from the second transport were deposited in the Kremlin, where the metal stock and Queen Maria's jewels, brought with the first transport, had also been deposited, while the CEC Bank's treasure was stored at the premises of the Russian Loan and Deposits House.

== The confiscation of the treasure ==
The Russian revolutionaries quickly gained control of the capital sparked by the economic crisis facing Russia during World War I, as well as the provocations of German agents. On March 15th, 1917, Tsar Nicholas II abdicated in favor of his brother Michael, who, however, refused the investiture. Power was then taken over by a provisional government, led until July 20th by Prince Lvov, and thereafter by Kerensky. On April 17th, Vladimir Lenin returned from Switzerland, transported in a sealed train car; ultimately, on November 7th, Lenin seized power, forcibly removing the provisional government.

The unrest spread to Moscow as well; the Cossack guard tasked with guarding the Romanian treasure sided with the revolution. To ensure the safety of the Romanian valuables stored at the Kremlin, 20 rural gendarmes dressed in civilian clothes were sent, departing from Iași on November 15th, 1917. However, in the absence of permission from the Bolshevik authorities, they were unable to fulfill their mission. Meanwhile, efforts were being made to transfer the treasure to the United States. However, the Allies could not guarantee the safety of the transport; this was not surprising, given that the treasure would have to traverse the entire Siberian region during a period of great social disorder.

In the meantime, the situation was also becoming complicated in Western Moldavia, where the government had taken refuge. The Russian army on Romanian territory was undergoing Bolshevikization, and its commander, General Dmitry Shcherbachev, no longer had control over it. Near Iași, at Socola, a genuine Bolshevik headquarters had been established with the objective of removing King Ferdinand I, instituting a Soviet regime in Romania, and assassinating Shcherbachev. An assassination attempt was organized against him on December 21st; failing in its attempt, the Russian commander requested the support of the Romanian army to destroy the Bolshevik center at Socola. After much deliberation, the Council of Ministers approved the request, disarming the Russian soldiers and sending them across the Prut River. However, this action placed Romania in open conflict with the Bolshevik power established in Petrograd, which, in violation of diplomatic rules, arrested Constantin Diamandi, Romania's minister to Petrograd, and held him in detention for three days.

However, the problem caused by the Bolshevikization of the army was not resolved. On March 15th, 1917, the Democratic Republic of Moldova was proclaimed in Bessarabia, but the disintegrating Russian armies made it impossible to establish order. In these circumstances, the Sfatul Țării (National Council) requested the intervention of the Romanian Army, which crossed the Prut River on January 20th, 1918. On January 26th, Russia, through Leon Trotsky, the Commissioner for Foreign Affairs, announced the severance of diplomatic relations with Romania, and General Shcherbachev was declared an outlaw and an enemy of the people. At the same time, Trotsky declared that "the Romanian funds deposited in Moscow are untouchable for the Romanian oligarchy. The Soviet government takes responsibility for keeping these funds and delivering them into the hands of the Romanian people."

Following the severance of diplomatic relations, Romania's interests in Russia continued to be temporarily represented by the French Ambassador to Petrograd, Joseph Noulens, and by Eirick Labonne, the French Consul in Moscow. The latter took over the archive of the Romanian Consulate General in Moscow on February 2nd, 1918, from the Romanian consul. On the same occasion, Labonne was handed the protocols for depositing the treasure of the National Bank of Romania and the valuables of the CEC Bank at the Kremlin, as well as the keys to the compartments where the National Bank's valuables were stored. The keys remained in the possession of the French consul until August 1918, when he was arrested and expelled. The keys were then handed over to the consul of Denmark and subsequently to that of Norway. In September 1918, the last representatives of Romania left Moscow, and from that moment on, nothing certain was known about the fate of the treasure.

== Partial return of assets from the Treasure ==
Very little is known about the Treasure after the October Revolution, but it appears that during World War II all the valuables held by the Soviet state (and presumably of the Romanian state) were taken out of Moscow and sent toward the regions which were 'not endangered'. However, it is clear that they were not kept sealed, as the agreement with the Romanian government said, as the chests of the archives which were returned in 1935 had obviously been rummaged through and many objects and documents were missing.

=== The first partial return in 1935 ===
On the evening of June 16, 1935, at the Obor train station in Bucharest, 17 freight cars arrived, loaded with 1,443 crates, coming from Moscow, upon the order of the USSR government, which decided to return to Romania a large part of the goods that had been stored in the Kremlin. Consuls Nicolau and Popovici supervised the opening of each individual wagon. The crates containing goods were handed over to various representatives of the institutions present at the unloading of the goods. For each unloading and delivery of objects and goods, a handover protocol was drawn up. The documents mentioned the number of crates, their detailed contents, weight, and the serial number from the inventory list that had been drawn up at the time of their loading with the destination Moscow, in December 1916 and/or July - August 1917.

The goods and banking assets (property titles, securities, shares, bonds, credit titles, bank guarantees, pledges, mortgages, etc.) were handed over to Inspector I. Ciolac, the head of the Romanian Government Oversight Commission, with the indication that they were to be transmitted to the Ministry of Finance in Bucharest. All inventories jointly conducted by the Soviet and Romanian sides, signed by each authorized representative of the Romanian institutions benefiting from these assets from the Treasury, were handed over to the representatives of the Ministry of Foreign Affairs in Bucharest. At the request of the Soviet side, comparative checks were carried out with the inventory lists issued at the time of the transfer of the goods to Russia, with the current ones from June 1935, containing the goods received by the Romanian side. In the vast majority (1,436 crates), the checks confirmed that the same goods as those listed in the inventory lists at the time of their shipment to Moscow had been handed over. However, 7 crates were found with different goods that were not listed in the initial lists drawn up in 1916. These were handed over to the Romanian Ministry of the Interior, following the same inventory procedure and the drafting of a handover protocol. The entire operation of identification, sorting, and delivery of the 1,443 crates took place between June 19 and June 27, 1935, working effectively from 8:00 to 17:30. The documents made it clear that no crate had the original seal anymore, so it was clear that the crates had been unsealed, and a good part of them was very degraded. The only banknotes returned to the National Bank of Romania were the Romanian ones, totaling 198,000 lei. Several other foreign banknotes were found stacked among the Romanian ones, which were handed over to the Ministry of Finance.

This transport marked the first return in the history of Romania's Treasury in Moscow, consisting of old documents, rare books, plans, maps, archives, deeds, manuscripts, church objects, carpets, rugs, deposits, paintings, pictures, sketches, drawings, art collections, and goods belonging to private individuals or state institutions.

On June 28, 1935, Romanian delegate G. Paraschivescu signed a report of receipt for these goods, specifying that no quantity of gold, jewelry, or other valuable items were handed over.

=== The second partial return in 1956 ===
After the communist forces took power in 1945 and the presence of the Red Army in Romania, the issue of the treasury was no longer raised by the Romanian authorities and was almost forgotten. Unexpectedly, on June 12, 1956, newspapers reported that the Romanian treasury in Moscow was to be returned. The official statement asserted that "the Soviet people have carefully preserved all these works of art, which represent great historical and artistic value. The USSR government and the Soviet people have always viewed these treasures as an inalienable asset of the Romanian people themselves."

The list of returned goods included the Pietroasele Treasure, 120 paintings signed by Nicolae Grigorescu (out of a total of 1350 paintings, engravings, and drawings), liturgical vessels made of gold and silver, old books and miniatures, jewelry, 156 icons, 418 tapestries, 495 religious cult objects, etc. In total, the exhibition opened in Bucharest in August 1956 with the items received from the USSR included no less than 39,320 pieces, including 33,068 gold coins and 2,465 medals, 1,350 paintings and drawings, and the remaining approximately 2,500 objects were medieval goldsmithing, liturgical embroideries, icons, and ancient fabrics.

The communist literature of the time attributed the return of the treasury to a "spontaneous and friendly" gesture from the USSR and promoted the idea that the entire treasury had been returned, information that could only be more detailed known after the Romanian revolution of December 1989. However, Romania was dissatisfied because the "bulk" of the Treasury, consisting of 93.4 tons of gold, had never been returned.

=== The third partial return in 2008 ===
After the fall of communism in Romania and Russia, the President of Romania, Ion Iliescu, sent Ambassador Traian Chebeleu to Moscow in the summer of 1994, with the task of requesting the Kremlin to "find a solution to the issue of Romania's Treasure." The new leadership in the Kremlin received the official letter from the Presidential Administration in Bucharest and responded that "for Russia, the so-called issue of the Romanian Treasure deposited in Moscow no longer exists."

The situation seemed to have no way out, especially since Moscow sent a delegation to Bucharest in the autumn of 1994, which informed President Ion Iliescu that "the issue of the Treasure, at the official, diplomatic, and political level between the two countries, had been definitively resolved by the Protocol signed in Moscow on September 6, 1956, including all its annexes, by academician Mihai Ralea, the official representative of the Government of the People's Republic of Romania on the issue of Romania's Treasure, a protocol which provided for the restitution of historical goods to the Government of the People's Republic of Romania." However, this protocol was only signed by academician Mihai Ralea, not by the other members of the Romanian delegation, namely: Romania's Ambassador to Moscow, Mihai Dalea, the Deputy Minister of Culture, Constantin Prisnea, the Director of the Art Institute of the Academy of the People's Republic of Romania, academician Gheorghe Oprescu, the academician and poet Tudor Arghezi, academician Andrei Oțetea, and the Director of the National Art Galleries, Marin Bunescu. All these Romanian delegates did not agree to sign that protocol; instead, they let only academician Mihail Ralea sign the official protocol and its annexes, while the other members of the Romanian delegation were only present at the official signing of the protocol and its annexes.

The Moscow delegation presented President Iliescu with a solution to solve the problem, by exponentially increasing economic and commercial exchanges between the two countries, offering Romania a package of 32 economic and commercial projects to be carried out through private companies, with project number 32 to be called "the restitution of the component of precious metals to the National Bank of Romania."

Iliescu was delighted with the Russians' offer and handed over the problem for resolution to his special advisor, Ioan Talpeș. However, Talpeș remained skeptical about Moscow's offer and requested, as a proof of good faith, that the Russian side hand over to Romania a set of 12 gold coins originating from the first shipment of the Treasure to Moscow, from the first train and the first crate, according to the existing inventory list in the archives.

The Russian side complied and immediately sent a delegate to Bucharest in December 1994 with the 12 gold coins requested by Ioan Talpeș, but no Romanian authority wanted to accept them thereafter. It was only on March 6, 2008, with donation act no. 1,272 issued by the Ministry of Culture, registered as donation no. 867/06.03.2008, that these 12 historical gold coins, editions from France and Belgium between 1854 and 1909, with a total weight of 77.09 grams, were finally handed over. The Head of the Numismatic and Historical Treasure Department at the National History Museum of Romania, Ernest Oberländer Târnoveanu, signed the acceptance document and certified that "all the presented coins are authentic."

== Efforts for the restitution of the treasure ==
=== Interwar Period ===
The issue of the Romanian treasure was raised for the first time internationally by Romania at the Paris Peace Conference during the session of the Reparation Commission, held on April 8, 1919. Romania requested that Germany and other defeated powers be obliged to return to Romania the sum of 322,154,980 gold lei, representing the value of the metallic (gold) stock deposited in Russia, to which was added the sum of 7,000,000 representing the value of Queen Maria's jewelry, as well as the value of the entire deposit made by Romania in Moscow, namely the sum of 7.5 billion lei. Two reasons were invoked for this request: firstly, it was said that the decision to transfer the treasure to Russia was motivated by German military pressure and that the existing situation in Russia was also attributable to Germany.

The Treaty of Versailles, concluded in June 1919, did not mention this issue, but held Germany and its associates responsible for all losses caused to the allied governments. The amount of reparations was to be determined by a Reparation Commission, which, although notified by Romania, rejected its claims for compensation. However, Russia's obligation to return the treasure was confirmed by the resolution of the Genoa Economic and Financial Conference (1922).

Efforts were made thereafter to resolve the treasure issue, but this was not successful. In 1936, in the context of a slight warming of relations between Romania and the USSR, some Romanian archives of minor significance relative to the entire ensemble of goods deposited in Moscow were returned. On the same occasion, however, the mortal remains of Dimitrie Cantemir were also repatriated.

=== Communist Period ===
Given the fraternal relations between the communist governments of Romania and the Soviet Union, potentially litigious issues between the two countries were carefully avoided by the Romanian side. One of them was the issue of the full restitution of the treasure, during the communist period, relatively few real efforts were made to discuss the problem with the Soviet side. One of the attempts - probably the most important one - took place in 1965 when Nicolae Ceaușescu made his first visit to the USSR as the General Secretary of the Romanian Communist Party. However, the Soviet reaction was brutal; according to Leonid Brezhnev's statement, the then leader of the Communist Party of the Soviet Union, the problem was "50 years old", "related to the relations between tsarist Russia and royal Romania" and that the gold had been transported in 1918 to Perm, Omsk, Saratov, and Kazan for safekeeping, with information missing from this point. Furthermore, Brezhnev invoked the fact that royal Romania also had debts to Russia amounting to $300,000,000, which would correspond to 274 tons of gold, and the reparations of $300,000,000 that Romania was obliged to pay after World War II were lower than the damages suffered by the USSR. It was concluded that the issue was actually a political one rather than a financial one, so the issue should be considered closed. After this episode, the issue was no longer discussed with the Soviet government.

=== Current Period ===
On July 4, 2003, the Treaty on Friendly Relations and Cooperation between Romania and the Russian Federation was concluded. The Russian side refused to settle the treasure issue through the treaty; instead, presidents Ion Iliescu and Vladimir Putin decided to establish a commission of Romanian and Russian historians to study the matter. The commission met for the first time from October 19 to 21, 2004, in Bucharest, with its co-chairs being Professor Ioan Scurtu and Academician Alexandr Oganovich Ciubarian. Nevertheless, the work of the commission has not progressed much to date. The commission met five times through 2019; some progress was made in returning smaller archive materials and minor assets, but the artistic pieces, the gold, and other valuables are still in Russia. As of 2023, the estimated value of the Romanian Treasure (without taking into account its historical significance) is close to €15 billion.

== See also ==
- Baldin Collection
- Romania–Russia relations
