= Ostrovany =

- Municipality
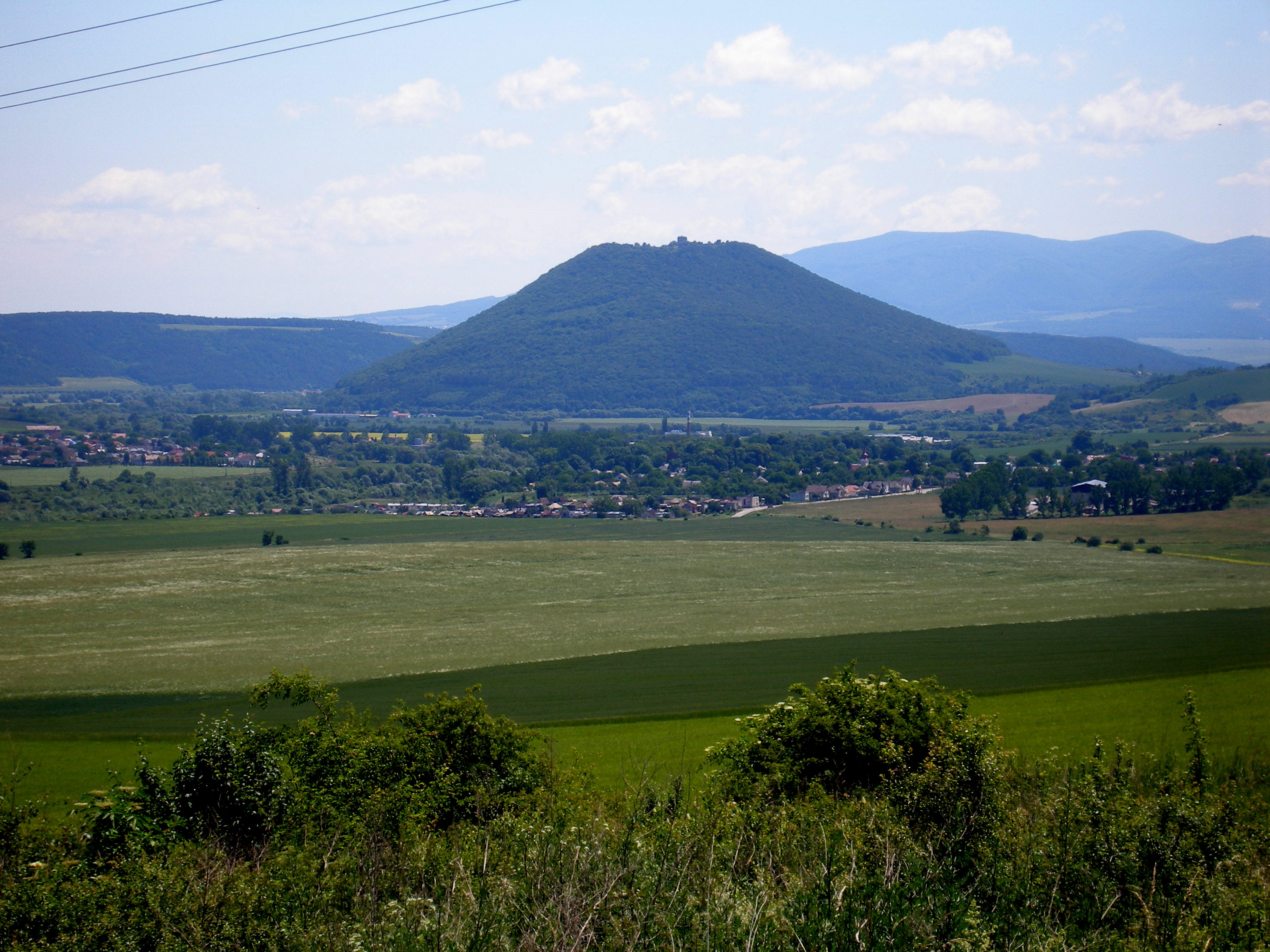

- Flag

- Location of Ostrovany in the Prešov Region Location of Ostrovany in Slovakia
- Coordinates: 49.07°N 21.12°E
- Country: Slovakia
- Region: Prešov Region
- District: Sabinov District
- First mentioned: 1248

Area
  - Total: 5.85 km^{2} (2.26 sq mi)
- Elevation: 306 m (1,004 ft)

Population (2025)
  - Total: 2,570
- Time zone: UTC+1 (CET)
  - Summer (DST): UTC+2 (CEST)
- Postal code: 822 2
- Area code: +421 51
- Vehicle registration plate (until 2022): SB
- Website: www.ostrovany.sk

Ostrovany (Hungarian: Osztrópatak) is a village and municipality in Sabinov District in the Prešov Region of north-eastern Slovakia.

== History ==
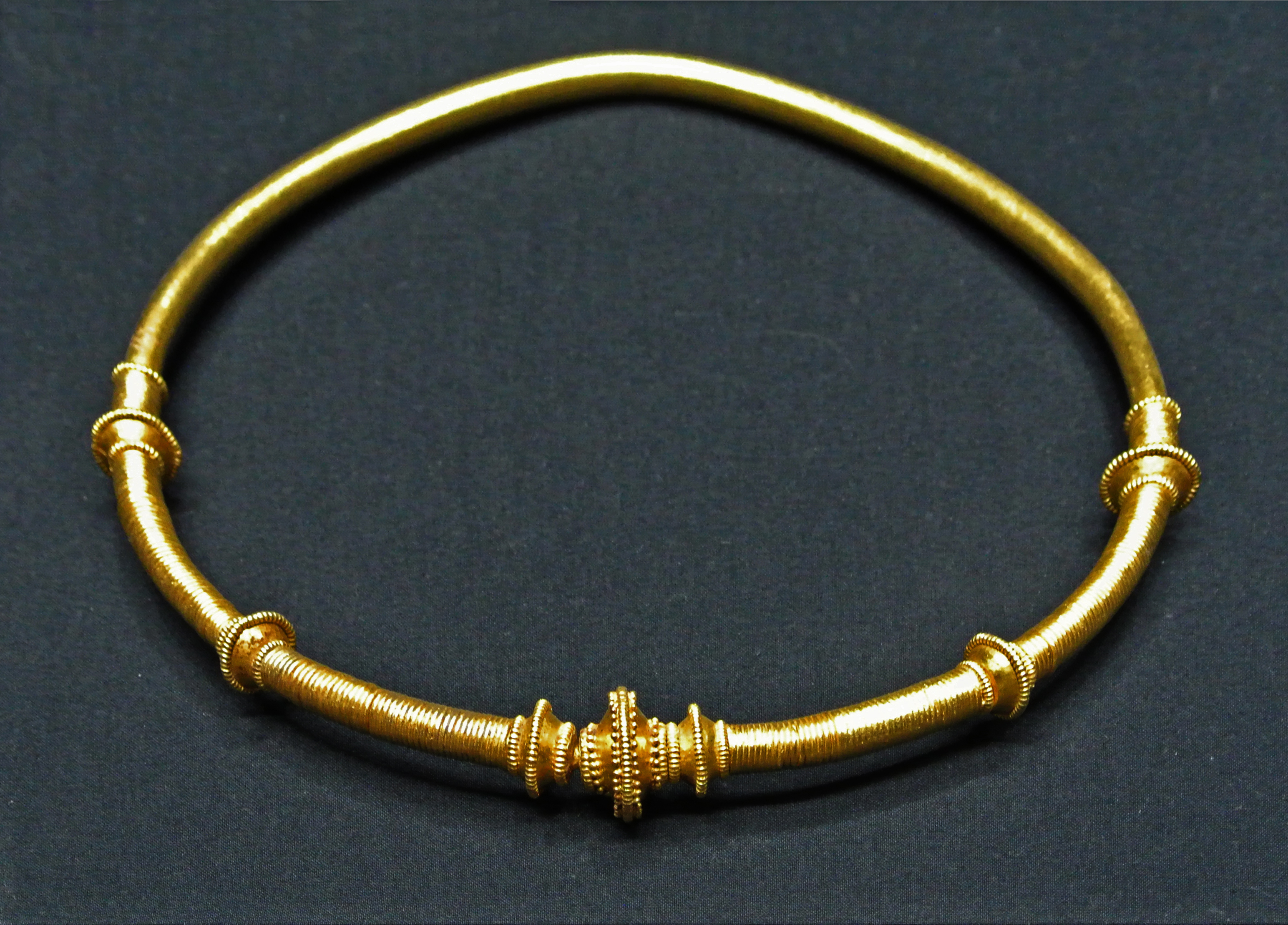
Neck ring from the 3rd century Treasure of Osztrópataka

In historical records the village was first mentioned in 1248. In 1790 and 1865, two rich finds from the burial of a Vandalic king were discovered in Ostrovany. The contents of the grave are located at the Kunsthistorisches Museum in Vienna, Austria and Budapest, Hungary respectively. The Treasure of Osztrópataka is considered to be one of the most important early-historical findings from Slovakia.

In 2010, the town received international media attention when the town council built a wall around part of Ostrovany, essentially making the enclosed part a gated community, in an attempt to keep out Roma neighbors with a "roma wall." Because of the apparent poverty of the Roma, at least one source likened the area outside the walls to a ghetto. The mayor Cyril Revak stated that the wall was built in order to prevent gardens from theft and vandalism, and that the Roma people had access to the village from other sides.

== Population ==
Population statistic (10 years)
Year	1995	2005	2015	2025
Count	1233	1648	2017	2570
Difference		+33.65%	+22.39%	+27.41%

Population statistic
Year	2024	2025
Count	2511	2570
Difference		+2.34%

It has a population of 2570 people (31 December 2025).

=== Ethnicity ===
Census 2021 (1+%)
Ethnicity	Number	Fraction
Slovak	2031	87.54%
Romani	1474	63.53%
Not found out	183	7.88%
Total	2320	

In year 2021 was 2320 people by ethnicity 2031 as Slovak, 1474 as Romani, 183 as Not found out, 12 as Hungarian, 3 as Polish, 2 as Czech, 1 as Ukrainian, 1 as Italian and 1 as Rusyn.

Note on population: The difference values of population numbers in the table "Population statistic" and in the sections "Ethnicity" & "Religion" is caused by the use of various statistical methods.

The vast majority of the municipality's population consists of the local Roma community. In 2019, they constituted an estimated 84% of the local population.

=== Religion ===
Census 2021 (1+%)
Religion	Number	Fraction
Roman Catholic Church	1674	72.16%
Apostolic Church	271	11.68%
Not found out	142	6.12%
None	112	4.83%
Evangelical Church	82	3.53%
Greek Catholic Church	33	1.42%
Total	2320	

In year 2021 was 2320 people by religion 1674 from Roman Catholic Church, 271 from Apostolic Church, 142 from Not found out, 112 from None, 82 from Evangelical Church, 33 from Greek Catholic Church, 2 from Calvinist Church, 2 from Christian Congregations in Slovakia, 1 from Jehovah's Witnesses and 1 from Buddhism.

Two-thirds of the population are Roma, and at least some of the Roma are impoverished enough to live in "shacks".

== Geography ==
The municipality lies at an altitude of 306 metres (1,004 ft) and covers an area of 5.85 km^{2} (2.26 sq mi) (2025).
