= Baldin Collection =

Artworks looted by Soviets from Germany

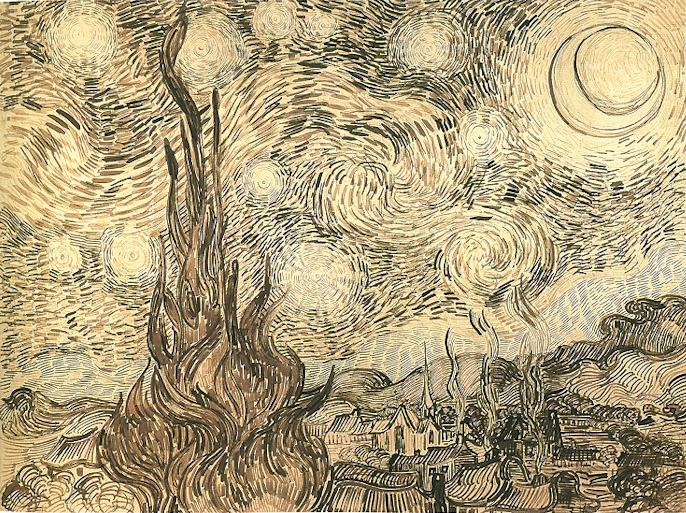
Cypresses in Starry Night (F 1540, JH 1732) by Vincent van Gogh (1889). The only known pen and ink study of The Starry Night and one of the most famous pieces in the "Baldin Collection".

The Baldin Collection is a group of 364 masterpieces removed from Germany to the Soviet Union by Soviet Army officer Victor Baldin at the end of World War II. The ensemble consists of 362 drawings and two paintings by Dürer, van Gogh, Manet, Rembrandt, Rubens, Titian and other famous artists. Historically part of the collection at the Kunsthalle Bremen, the Baldin group came from a much larger cache of artworks stored by the Germans in a Brandenburg castle to protect it from air raids. In 1945 the castle was occupied by the Red Army and the storage vaults were looted, mainly by Russian soldiers but also by the local German population. The works Baldin took were then hidden at a Soviet research institute for many years. In 1991 the collection was moved to the Hermitage Museum in Saint Petersburg where its existence was revealed to the world in 1992. It remains there today.

Since then the Baldin Collection has been regarded as looted art and is the subject of fierce debate among experts, between Germany and Russia, and among politicians inside Russia itself. While Victor Baldin did steal the works, he is also credited with having saved them from destruction. For decades he appealed to senior officials, including Soviet leaders Leonid Brezhnev and Mikhail Gorbachev, to get them returned to Germany. In 1989 Baldin even traveled to Bremen, West Germany, to reveal the existence of the secret collection to the Kunsthalle. In the 1990s the government of Boris Yeltsin finally agreed to return the works, but subsequent Russian governments have blocked such plans. Today the Collection has been called "of singular importance to the entire issue of trophy art" by the Russians and a "cause célèbre of German-Russian Restitution Politics" by those who support its return.

== History ==
=== Kunsthalle Bremen Collection ===
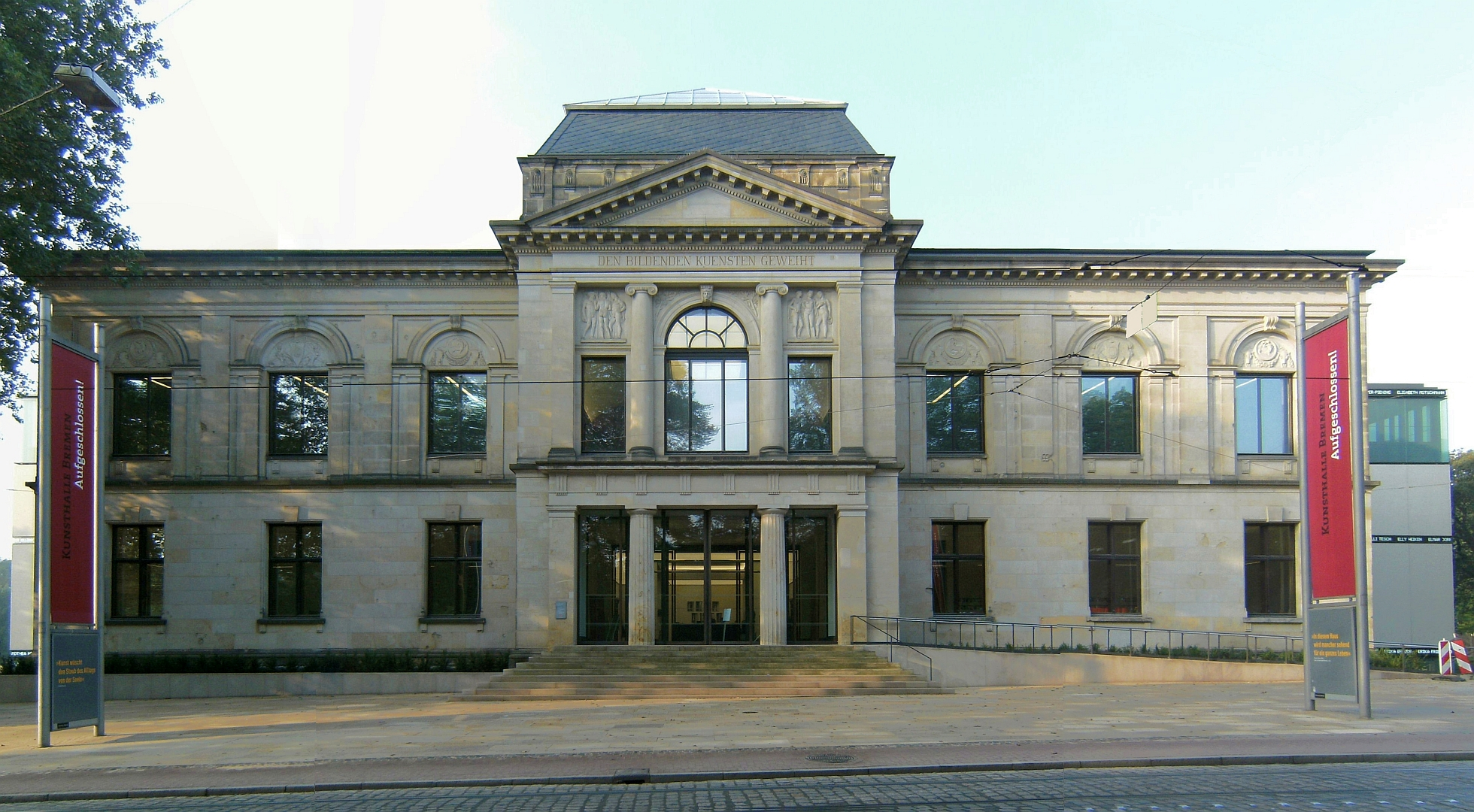
The Kunsthalle in Bremen, Germany

At the outbreak of World War II in 1939, the Bremen Art Museum (German: Kunsthalle Bremen) was closed and its priceless paintings, drawings, prints, and sculpture were stored in the basement. Bremen, an important manufacturing center, became an early target for Allied strategic bombing. On the night of 5 September 1942, a fire bomb destroyed the central staircase and six gallery rooms of the museum. It also burned the original version of Emanuel Leutze's famous painting Washington Crossing the Delaware, which because of its size could not be moved. After this damage, the Kunsthalle collections were moved to more secure storage in various bank vaults underneath Bremen. In 1943, as bombing intensified, Bremen's mayor decreed that the museum's collections be moved to safety outside the city. The collection was divided up between four castles in Germany. A set of 50 paintings, 1715 drawings and 3000 prints were moved to Schloss Karnzow, the hunting lodge of Count von Königsmarck, near the small town of Kyritz north of Berlin in the Province of Brandenburg.

=== Karnzow Castle and Victor Baldin, 1945 ===
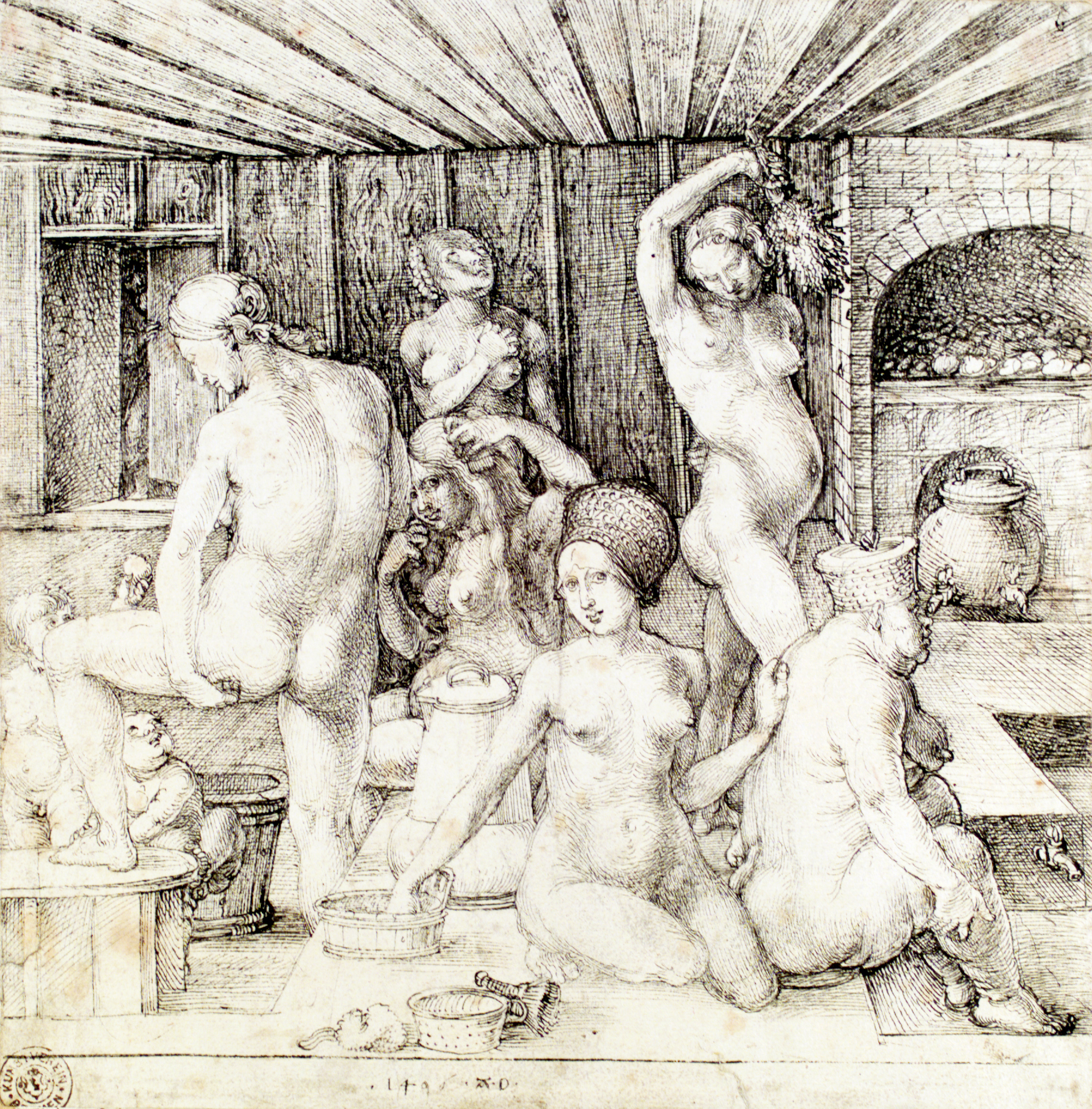
Frauenbad by Albrecht Dürer (1496). Not part of the Baldin Collection itself, but taken by the same military unit from the same storage vaults at Karnzow Castle

After Germany's defeat, Brandenburg and specifically the area around Karnzow Castle was occupied by the Red Army. On 29 May 1945 soldiers and officers of the 38th Field Engineers' Brigade billeted at the Castle began looting it. Victor Baldin, an Army captain and combat engineer, found opened boxes in the cellar, saw documents trampled on the floor, and observed soldiers lighting their way by using burning papers. Baldin, an art restorer before the war, recognized these as drawings by the great masters. Baldin intervened and sealed the cellar. Scrutinizing the treasures lying about, he found works by Corot, Delacroix, Degas, Dürer, Van Dyke, Van Gogh, Goya, Manet, Raphael, Rembrandt, Rodin, Rubens, Toulouse-Lautrec, and Titian.

Baldin became determined to save what he could. He later said "I started in on the beautiful things, then I saw it was all beautiful." He took drawings away from soldiers by force, by deception and in exchange for personal items. In one case, it took him three days to obtain a drawing of Christ's head by Albrecht Dürer from another officer. Baldin managed to coax the officer into exchanging it for his chrome boots. Of the thousands of works stored in the cellar, Baldin managed to save just 362 drawings and two paintings. Among them was the only known pen and ink study by van Gogh of his famous 1889 painting, The Starry Night. As the Soviet Army withdrew, the cellars were left open and what little remained of the collection was lost to local looters and the weather.

Baldin's actions and motives are still debated today. He did indeed cut the drawings from their mounts, put them into a suitcase, carried them to the Soviet Union, and hid them in his apartment. However, while at the castle, Baldin also wrote down descriptions of every work he saw, copied the German signatures and labels, and later carefully documented their provenance. He also begged for an official military transport so the collection could be handled more securely, but none were available, and his request was denied. As a result, it is generally agreed that Baldin's efforts rescued priceless masterpieces from outright destruction. In addition, because of his specialized art knowledge, what would become known as the "Baldin Collection" became the most important part of the Kunsthalle collection remaining from Schloss Karnzow.

In contrast to Baldin's efforts, works looted by Baldin's comrades from Karnzow have been found as far afield as Azerbaijan and in varying states of decay. In the late 1990s, eight disputed drawings, including the world-famous Frauenbad ("Women's Bathhouse") by Albrecht Dürer, were seized by United States Customs in an incident of black market trading. Today over 1,500 items from the Kunsthalle collection that were stored at Karnzow remain missing.

=== Postwar period, 1946–1990 ===
After their return home, some of the officers who had participated in the looting at Karnzow donated their pieces to museums around the Soviet Union. In 1948 Baldin deposited his at the Shchusev Museum of Architecture in Moscow, where the masterpieces became a Soviet state secret. Baldin worked as an art restorer at the museum and eventually became its general director in 1963, a post he held for 25 years.

Baldin then tried for decades to give the stolen art back to Germany. He took the courageous steps of writing to Soviet leader Leonid Brezhnev in 1973, to the chief ideologist of the Communist Party Yegor Ligachev in 1987, and many other Soviet political and cultural officials including Mikhail Suslov, Mikhail Gorbachev, and Raisa Gorbachev – all to no avail. In 1989, during the period of increased transparency in the Soviet Union known as perestroika, Baldin took another unprecedented step. He traveled to Bremen, West Germany, and met with the director of the Kunsthalle, Dr Siegfried Salzmann. The director was shocked to learn that important parts of the long lost collection had survived. With hands shaking, he read the list of the missing masterpieces that Baldin had prepared years before. Baldin had put pencil marks next to those works he had personally rescued. He has since been called the "hero of the story."

=== Post-Soviet period, 1991–2000 ===
In 1991, Baldin wrote to Russian president Boris Yeltsin and finally received his first reply, in which the president agreed it would be politically correct to return the works to Germany. However, that same year nationalist elements in the Russian government hurriedly transferred the collection to the State Hermitage Museum in St. Petersburg in a cover-up attempt. As of 2012 it is still unclear if one of the most famous works in the collection, Cypresses in Starry Night (1889) by Van Gogh, is at the Hermitage or remains in Moscow.

In legal proceedings and political debates during the following years it appeared that collection might return to its rightful owner. In 2000, a group of 101 pieces from another part of Baldin's brigade, including Albrecht Dürer's 1494 watercolor View of a Rock Castle by a River, were returned to the Kunsthalle by Russia. This was followed by the simultaneous return of two artifacts of the Amber Room, bought and financed by a Bremen businessman to speed up the process. Anatoly Vilkov, from the Russian Ministry of Culture, stated that "Russia has no right to keep the Baldin collection. We did not receive this right through a gift, since by law the collection did not belong to the donor Baldin."

=== Latest disputes, 2003–present ===
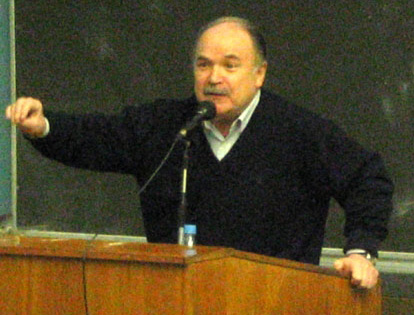
Nikolai Gubenko in 2005

The potential return of the collection to Germany began to face increasing opposition from Russian nationalist leaders, including Communist legislator and former minister of culture of the USSR, Nikolai Gubenko. Gubenko had been one of those involved in the 1991 transfer of the art to the Hermitage to hide it. The State Duma, which included Gubenko as a member, passed a non-binding resolution on 12 March 2003 asking President Vladimir Putin to prevent the Ministry of Culture from returning the Baldin Collection.

Russian minister of culture, Mikhail Shvydkoy, opposed these moves to keep the collection in Russia; he regarded it as illegal loot based on a 1998 law that protected only those artworks from World War II taken by official Soviet trophy brigades and not private citizens. In 2003 he confirmed an order by the Prosecutor General of Russia confirming a resolution of the Hanse Supreme court, which had decided the entire 364 remaining items were the official property of the Bremen Kunsthalle. Shvydkoy and the German minister of culture, Christina Weiss, even signed an agreement that 20 pieces of the Baldin ensemble could remain in Russia. Shvydkoy later received an official reprimand and was threatened by deputy prosecutor Vladimir Kolsenikov with criminal charges if he attempted to return the rest of the collection to Germany. In 2005 Aleksandr Sergeyevich Sokolov, Russia's new minister of culture, then contradicted previous promises and stated that he opposed the return of the Baldin collection to Germany. As of 2010, it appeared that the collection would not be returning to Germany any time soon.

== Legacy ==
According to a 2005 interview with Baldin's widow Julia Siwakowa, it was always his wish that the looted art be returned to the Kunsthalle. Baldin's last will stated: "The collection belongs to humankind, not only Germany, and as the collection was located at the Kunsthalle Bremen, it must be returned to this place." The history of Victor Baldin, the stolen paintings and their odyssey is featured in the 2007 book Victor Baldin – The Man with the Suitcase/Victor Baldin – Der Mann mit dem Koffer.

== See also ==
- The Berlinka, a collection of German art found in 1945 in Lower Silesia, Poland, and presently kept in the Jagiellonian Library in Kraków.
- Romanian Treasure, valuable objects and gold reserves of Romania sent to Russia between 1916 and 1917.
