= Treasure of Osztrópataka =

East Germanic burial site and hoard

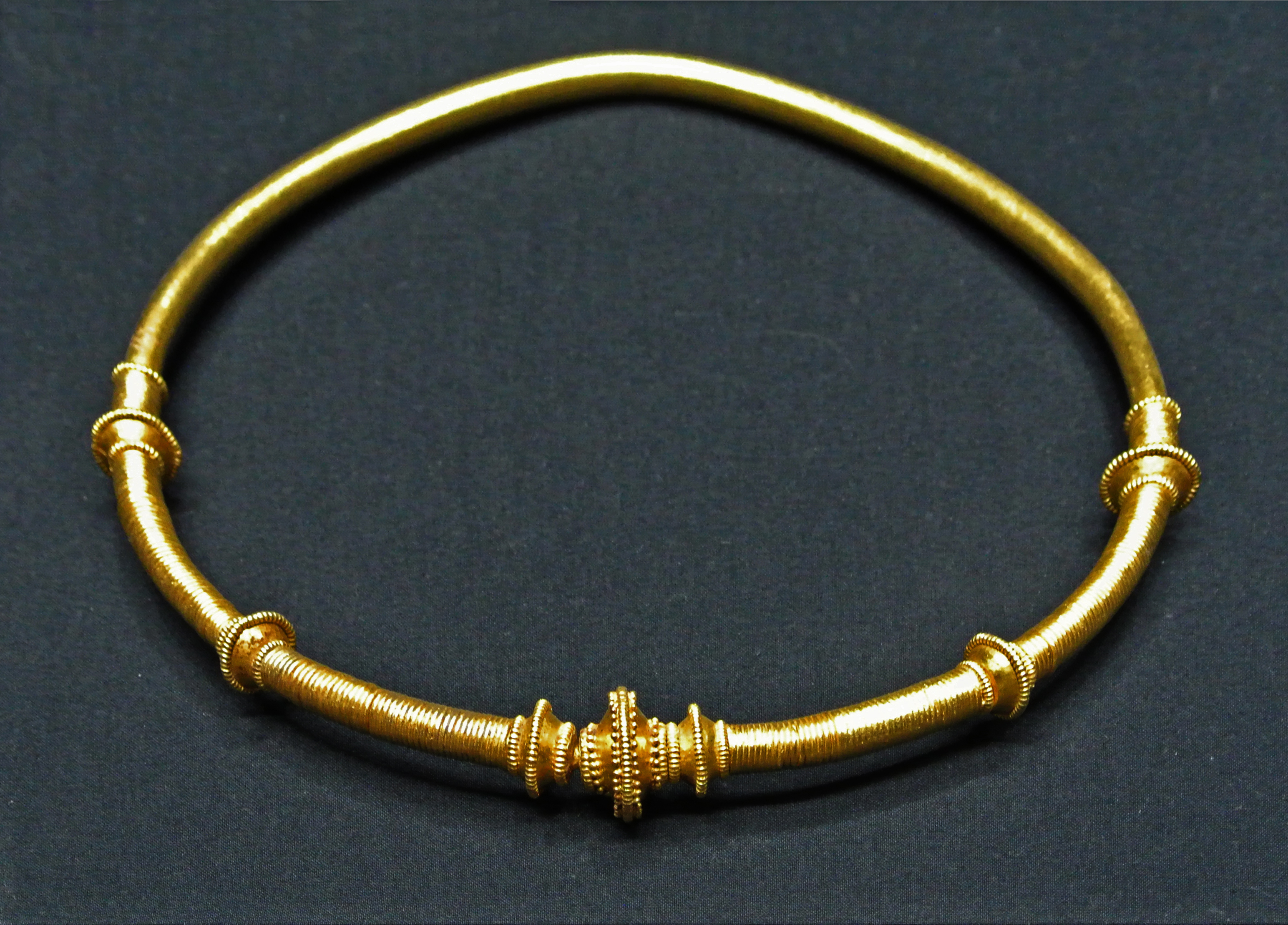
Neck ring with plug clasp from the Treasure of Osztrópataka displayed at the Kunsthistorisches Museum in Vienna, Austria.

The Treasure of Osztrópataka (today Ostrovany, northeastern Slovakia) is an East Germanic burial site dating to the late 3rd century AD. It was discovered in 1790 and is displayed today in the Kunsthistorisches Museum in Vienna, Austria. Further contents of the burial discovered in 1865 are located at the Hungarian National Museum in Budapest, Hungary. The treasure includes Germanic and above all Roman objects, and probably belonged to an influential Vandalic king from around 270–90 AD. It is one of the most important early-historical findings from Slovakia.

== See also ==
- Ring of Pietroassa
- Pietroasele Treasure
