= Pietroasele Treasure =

Gothic treasure

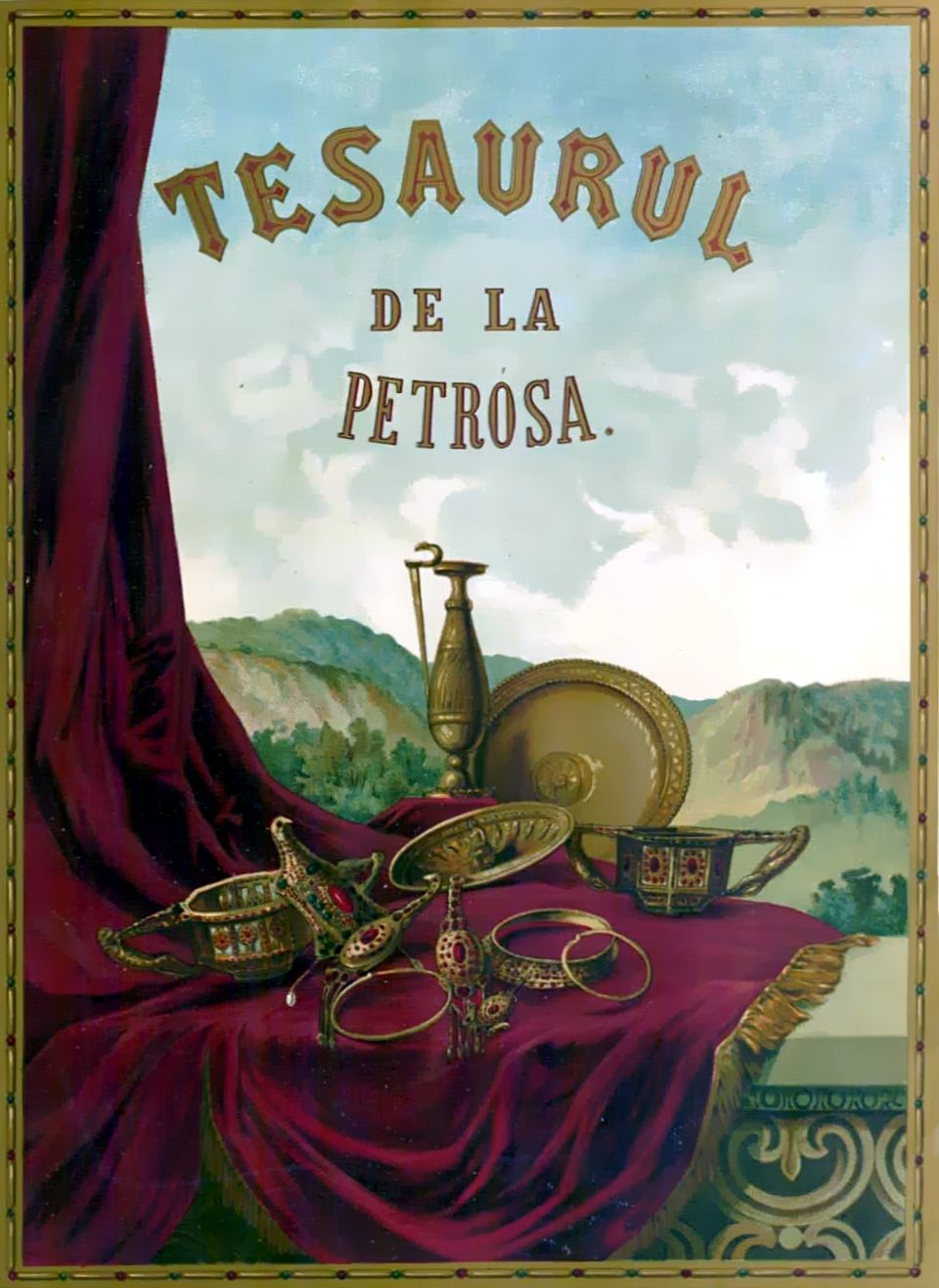
Frontispiece of Alexandru Odobescu's Trésor de Petroasa (1889), by Henri Trenk.

The Pietroasele Treasure (or the Petrossa Treasure) found in Pietroasele, Buzău, Romania, in 1837, is a late fourth-century Gothic treasure that included some twenty-two objects of gold, among the most famous examples of the polychrome style of Migration Period art.

Of the twenty-two pieces, only twelve have survived, conserved at the National Museum of Romanian History, in Bucharest: a large eagle-headed fibula and three smaller ones encrusted with semi-precious stones; a patera, or round sacrificial dish, modelled with Orphic figures surrounding a seated three-dimensional goddess in the center; a twelve-sided cup, a ring with a Gothic runic inscription, a large tray, two other necklaces and a pitcher.

== History ==
When Alexandru Odobescu published his book on the treasure, he considered that such magnificent work could only have belonged to Athanaric (died 381), leader of the Thervings, a Gothic people. Modern archaeologists cannot connect the hoard with such a glamorous name.

The treasure was shipped to Moscow in December 1916, as German armies advanced through Romania in World War I, and was not returned until 1956.

The artifacts were restored in a way that has been questioned more recently. For instance, old photos show that the head of the largest bird brooch was originally detached, and the present restoration has the head on the wrong way round. In its original state the head would have faced forwards and the brooch would have sat like a bird on the shoulder fastening a cloak in imitation of the Roman fashion.

Pietroasele Treasure has been called by Romanians „Cloșca cu puii de aur” (The hatching hen with the golden chicken).

The constituents objects of the treasure are divided into two categories: ornaments and vessels. The images that have survived through the millennia, as well as the texts that survived from those ancient times show that tableware was still a mandatory accessory of festive meals back then, and this category also included the ceremonial tableware found in the heritage of temples. By using them for religious ceremonies as well as banquets, these objects acquired new values and therefore new meanings. In addition to their decorative value, they also had a symbolic value, being perceived most often as symbols of social status or as a declaration of identity, implicitly belonging to a social ethnic group.

== Interpretation ==
The hoard represents multiple artistic styles: the Han Chinese influence has been noted in the belt buckles, the Hellenistic influence in the golden bowls, Sasanian motifs in the baskets, and Germanic fashions in the fibulae. Such heterogeneity is characteristic of the cosmopolitan outlook of the Chernyakhov culture in a region without defined topographic confines.

An atomic analysis of the Pietroasele gold hoard has concluded that from the point of view of Ir/Au, Cu/Au and Ag/Au concentrations the three styles are clustered. At least from the iridium concentration data, the assumption of a Dacian provenance of the hoard raw material is highly improbable as also the hypothesis that Roman imperial gold coins were used for manufacturing Pietroasa artifacts is not in accordance with the elemental concentrations.

== Gallery ==
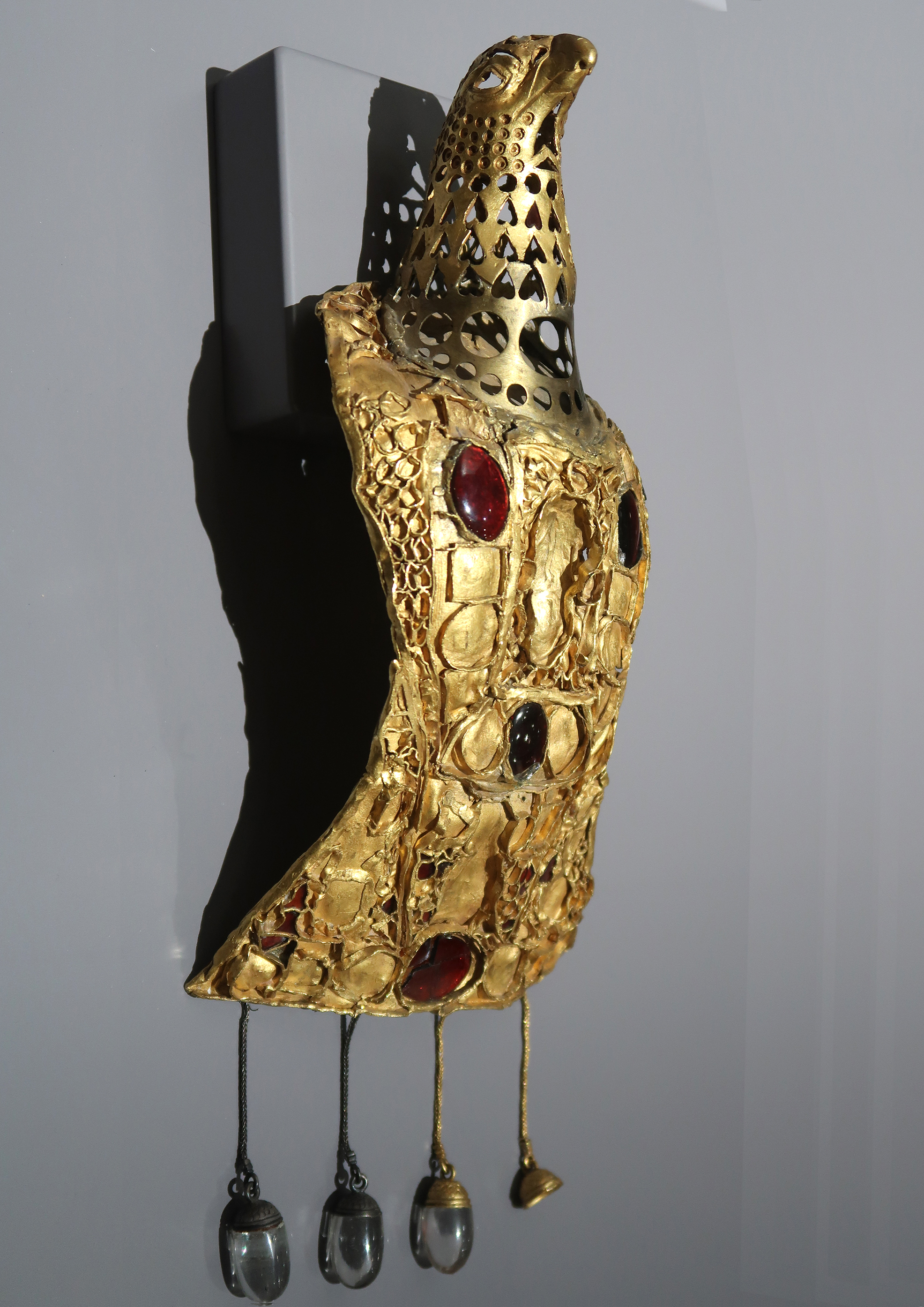
An eagle-shaped fibula

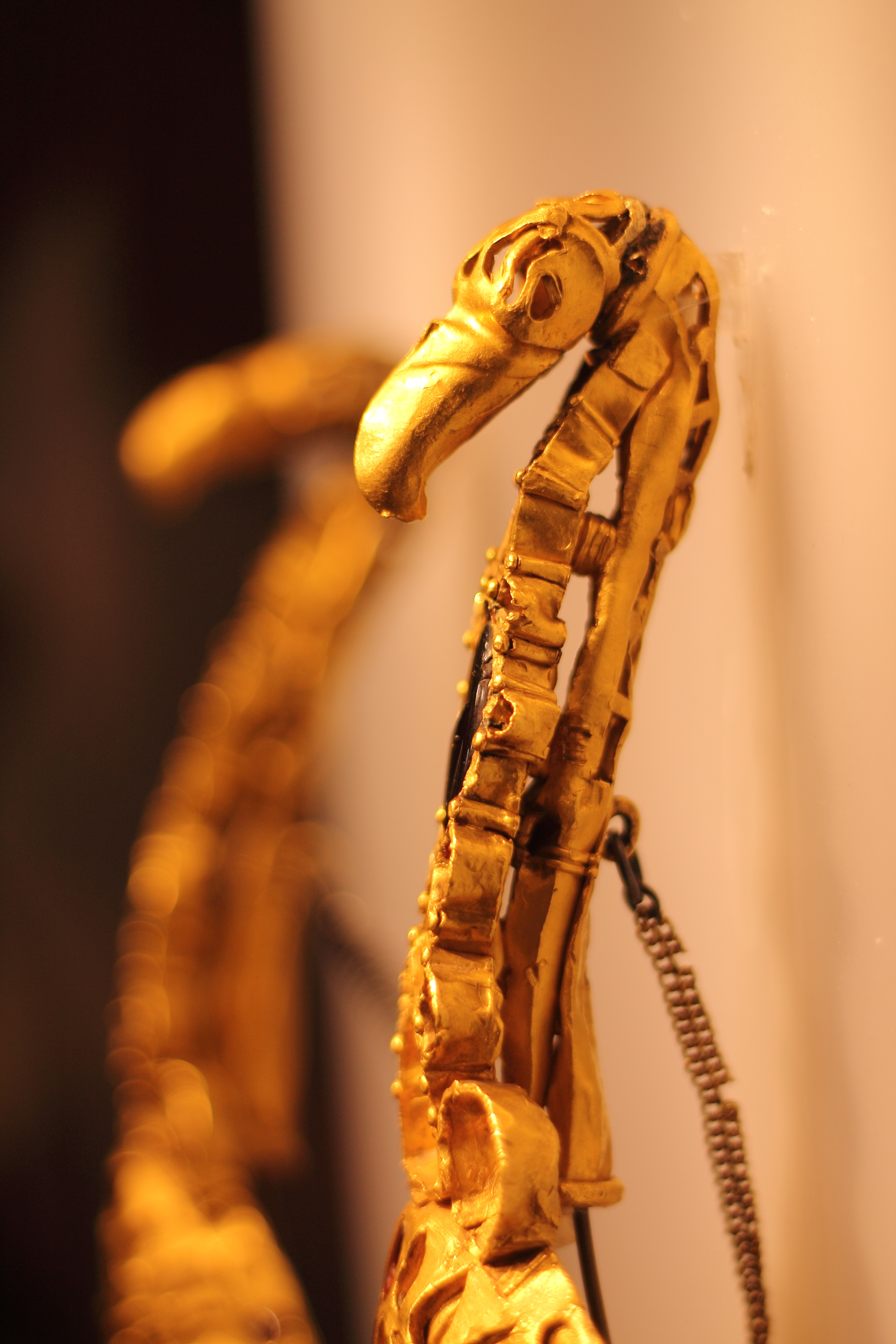
Eagle-shaped middle fibulae, worn in pairs by Gothic women

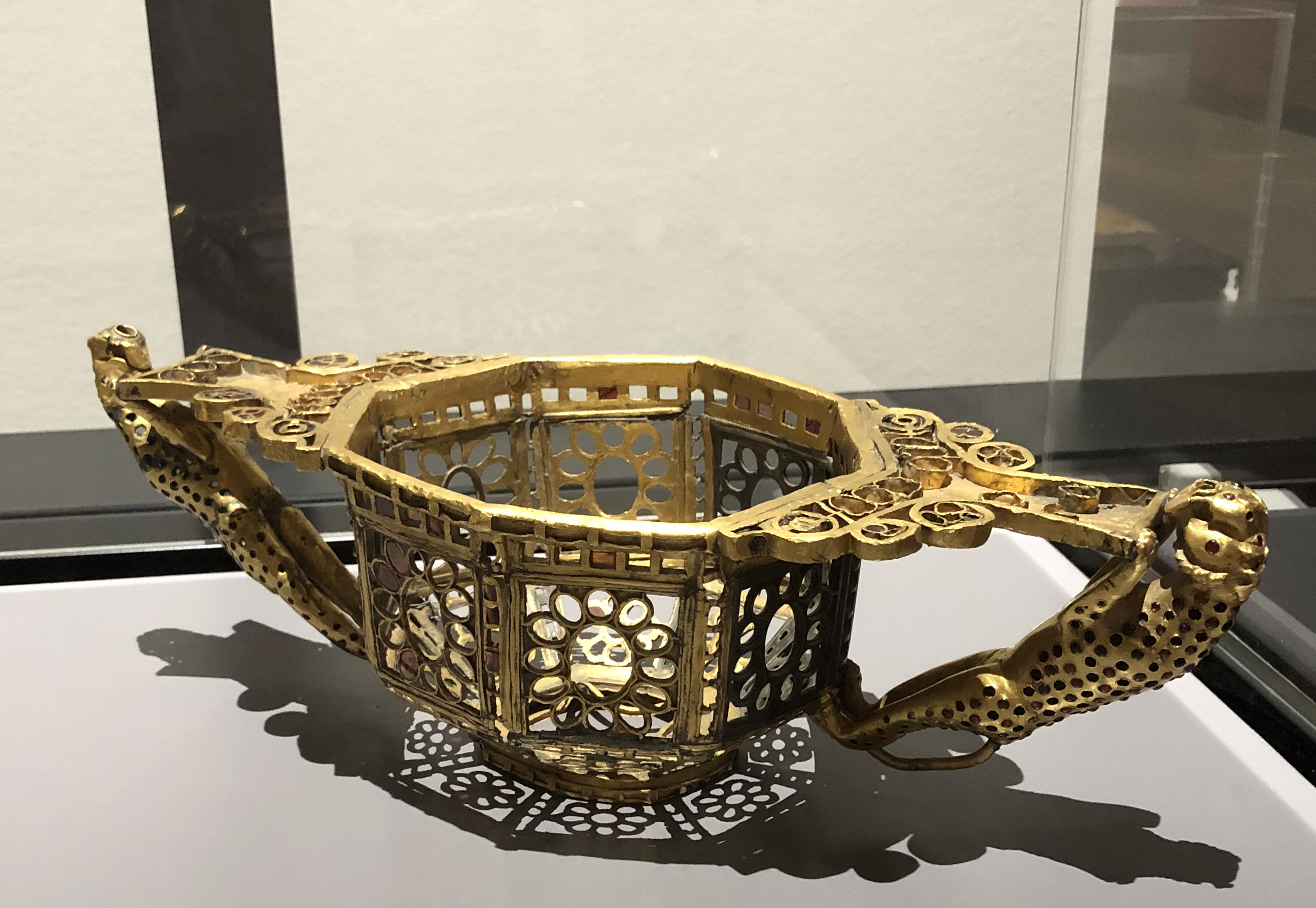
Cup of gold, silver, garnet and tourmaline

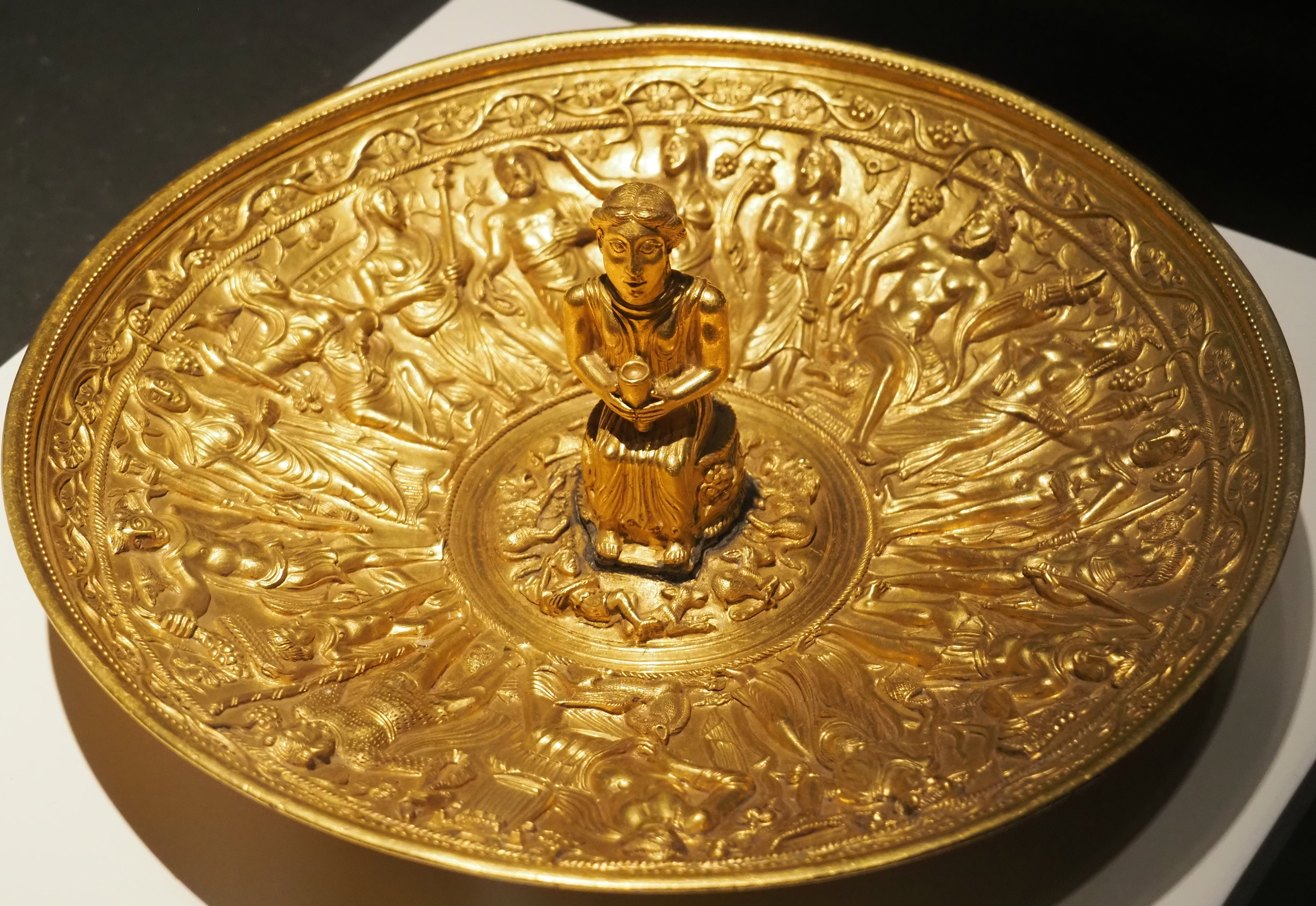
Patera from the Pietroasele hoard, National Museum of Romanian History (Inv. 11427)

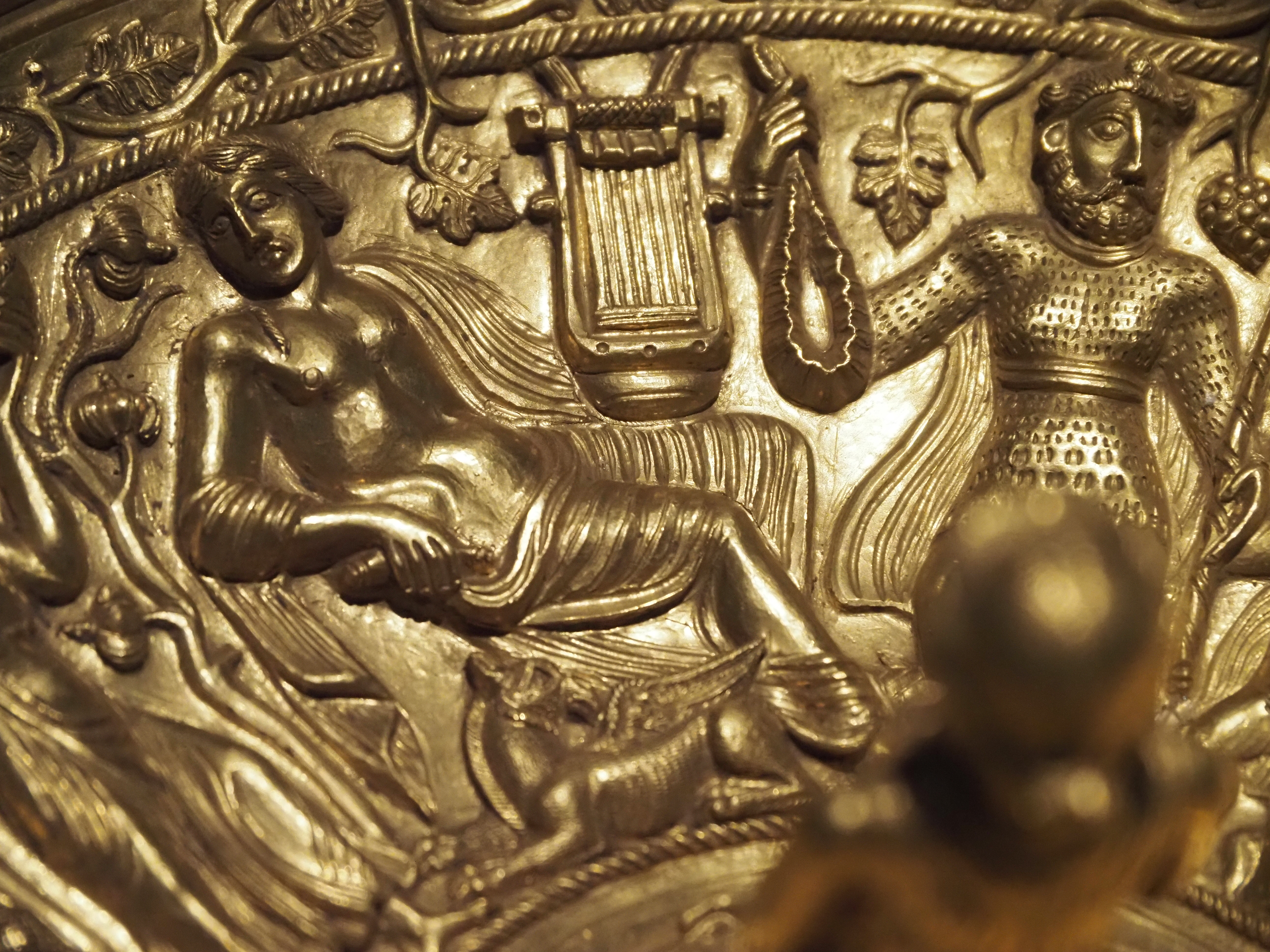
Detail on the patera

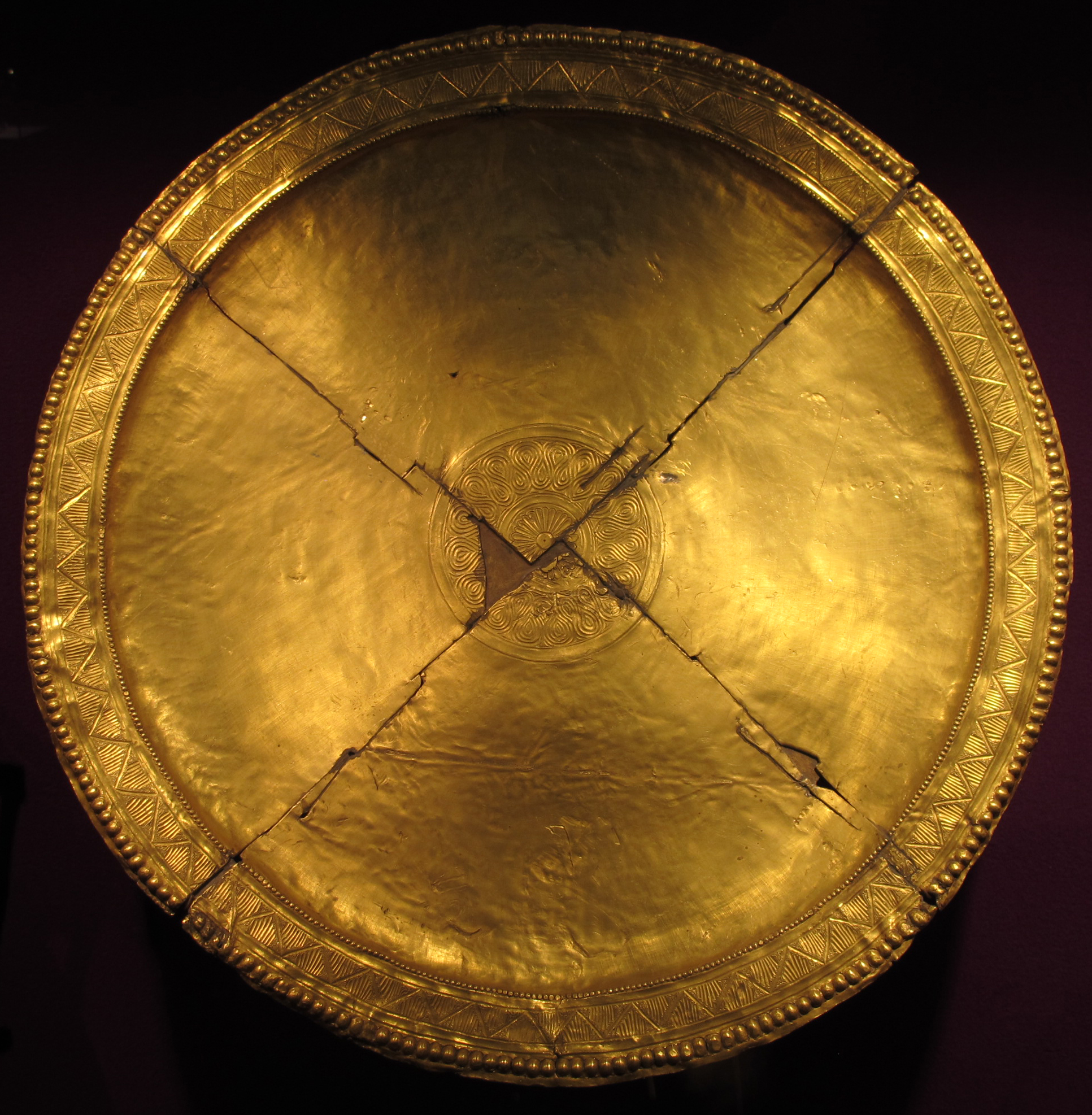
Plate with concentric ornamentation

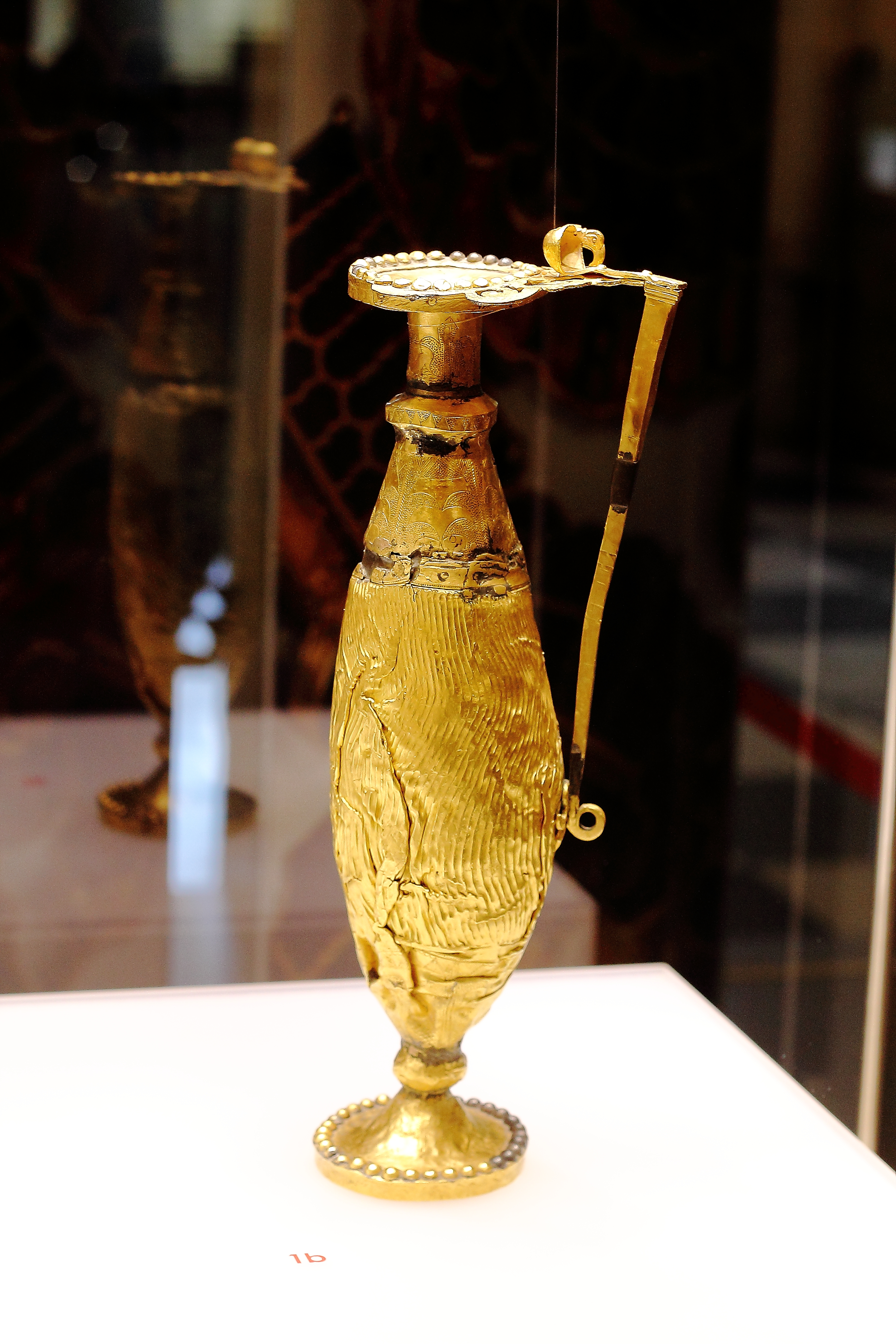
Oenochoe

== See also ==
- Ring of Pietroassa
- Treasure of Osztrópataka
- Romanian Treasure
