= Berlinka (art collection) =

Library

Coordinates: 50°03′41″N 19°55′25″E

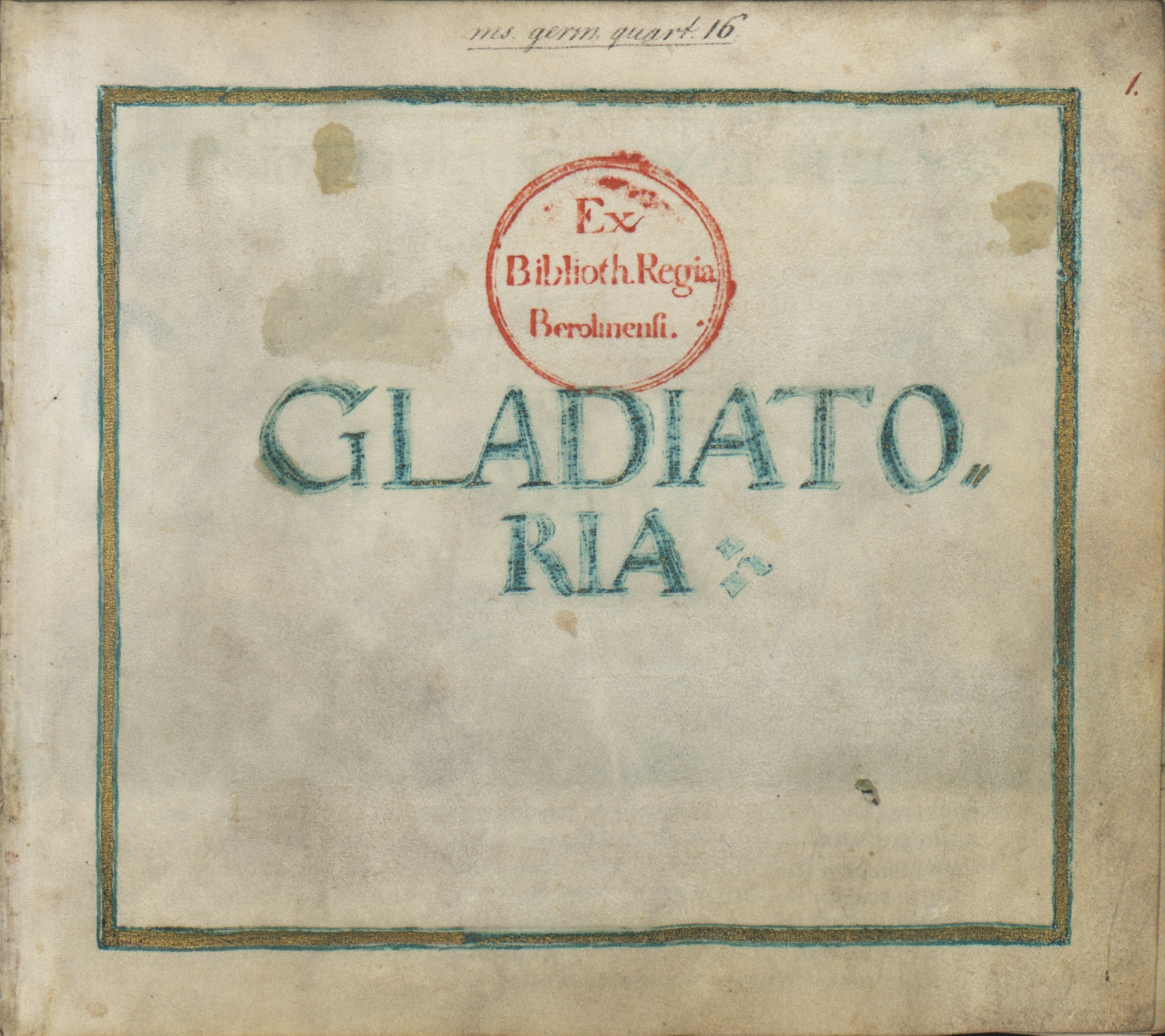
Gladiatoria fencing manual, 15th century, front cover with stamp Ex Biblioth. Regia Berolinensi.

The Berlinka ('Berliner'), also depozyt berliński and skarb pruski ('Prussian Treasure'), is the Polish name for a collection of German original manuscripts originally kept at the Prussian State Library in Berlin, which have been held by the Jagiellonian Library in Kraków since the end of World War II. The legal status of the documents is subject to ongoing debate.

== History ==
During the Second World War, from September 1942 onwards, German authorities moved the material from Berlin to the seized abbey of Grüssau (present-day Krzeszów) in Prussian Lower Silesia to protect it from Allied strategic bombing. When the Lower Silesian territory east of the Oder–Neisse line came under the administrative sovereignty of the Republic of Poland after the war, the Polish government claimed the collection as war reparations. In the winter of 1945–1946, the inventories were removed by Polish milicja and transferred to Kraków.

In 1965, the Polish and East German governments signed an agreement on the return of large collections of the Prussian State Library, but the Polish authorities kept the Berlinka's existence at the Jagiellonian Library a secret until 1977, when Polish First Secretary Edward Gierek presented his East German counterpart Erich Honecker with seven pieces of sheet music, including Mozart's original score of The Magic Flute and Beethoven's notes for his Symphony No. 9.

== Debate ==
Since the jurisdiction of the former eastern territories of Germany was withdrawn by the 1945 Potsdam Agreement, Poland claims that it should retain ownership of the Berlinka as compensation for Polish cultural assets destroyed or looted by Germans during the Second World War. The total worth of Polish cultural heritage destroyed by Nazi Germany, especially after the failed Warsaw Uprising in 1944, is estimated at $20 billion.

Some German media have referred to the Berlinka as the "last German prisoner of war". The German government claims that Poland is in violation of Article 56 of the Hague Convention of 1907, but the Polish side emphasises that the collections were on Polish territory after the war, not looted.

After the Revolutions of 1989, the Polish–German Treaty of Good Neighbourship was signed in 1991, and several negotiations have taken place to clarify the whereabouts of the Berlinka. In 2000, Foreign Minister Władysław Bartoszewski proposed establishing a Polish–German foundation to take possession of disputed collections, but the German government declined. Germany demands unconditional return, while Poland cites remaining unresolved claims for looted Polish cultural property.

In summer 2007, Der Spiegel quoted the German Foreign Office representative Julia Gross as saying that proceedings over the disposition had reached a low point, and Poland stated that return was out of the question. In 2014, Germany returned to Poland the painting Schody pałacowe (English: Palace Stairs) by Francesco Guardi, looted from the National Museum, Warsaw in 1939. This gesture was meant to restart negotiations for the Berlinka.

== Contents ==
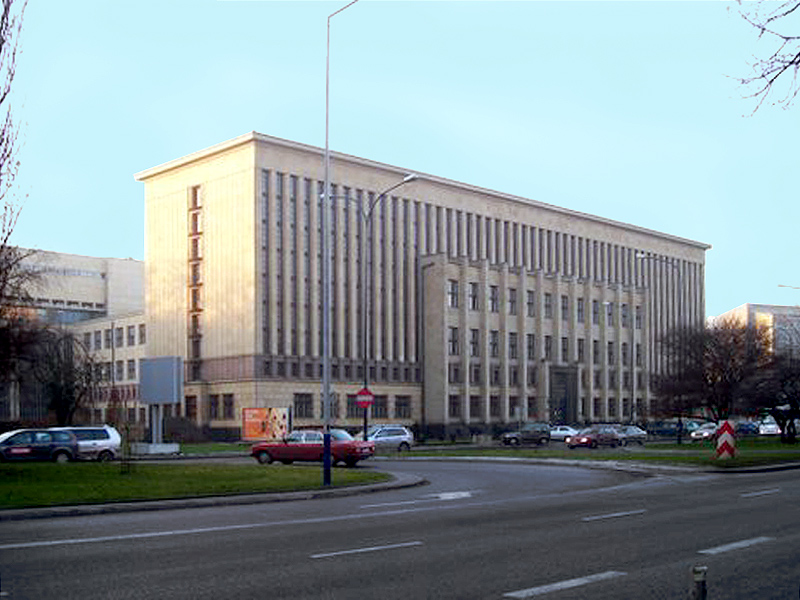
Jagiellonian Library, Kraków

The Berlinka comprises some of the most valuable holdings of the former Prussian State Library. It includes over 500,000 medieval manuscripts, early modern printings and autographs, including works by Martin Luther, Johannes Calvin, Johann Wolfgang von Goethe, Friedrich Schiller, Georg Wilhelm Friedrich Hegel, and Johann Gottfried Herder. Holdings include letters from Ludmilla Assing and Karl August Varnhagen von Ense, personal copies of the Deutsches Wörterbuch with hand-written notes by the Brothers Grimm, and original musical scores by Johann Sebastian Bach, Wolfgang Amadeus Mozart (Die Entführung aus dem Serail), Ludwig van Beethoven, Franz Schubert, Johannes Brahms, Robert Schumann, Joseph Haydn, Felix Mendelssohn-Bartholdy, Niccolò Paganini, Ferruccio Busoni, Luigi Cherubini, and Georg Philipp Telemann.

The collections also include manuscripts and incunables from Polish monasteries in Gniezno, Lubiń, Mogilno, Pakość, Pelplin, and Poznań, taken by Prussian authorities between 1820 and 1840 from the territories gained in the Partitions of Poland, as well as incunables from the German monastery at Paradies.

The collections are accessible to researchers and post-graduate students only. After some incunables were found at auctions, access restrictions were tightened in 1999.

== See also ==
- Baldin Collection
- Destruction of Warsaw
- Nazi plunder
- World War II looting of Poland
- Załuski Library

== Literature ==
Jakub Gortat: „A Rift in Friendship: The Prussian State Library between the GDR and Poland”, German Studies Review 42.2 (2019): 299–318.

Jakub Gortat: “‘Berlinka‘. Ein besonderer deutsch-polnischer Erinnerungsort”, Convivium. Germanistisches Jahrbuch Polen 2017 (2018): 105-128.

Marek Sroka, “The Music Collection of the Former Prussian State Library at the Jagiellonian Library in Kraków, Poland: Past, Present and Future Developments,” Library Trends 55, no. 3(2007): 651–664.
