= Alexandru Odobescu =

Romanian writer, archaeologist, and politician (1834 – 1895)

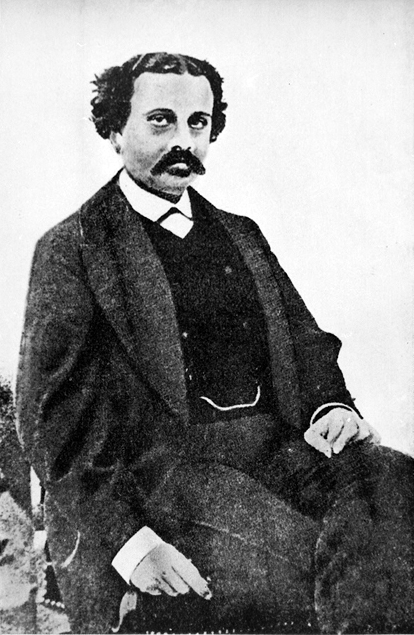
- Born: 23 January 1834; Bucharest, Wallachia
- Died: 10 November 1895 (aged 61); Bucharest, Romania
- Resting place: Bellu Cemetery, Bucharest
- Education: Saint Sava National College; Collège de France; Sorbonne
- Occupations: Archaeologist, historian, essayist, playwright, publicist, politician
- Spouse: Alexandra Prejbeanu
- Children: 1
- Parent(s): Ioan Odobescu (father); Ecaterina Caracaș (mother)
- Writing career
- Language: Romanian
- Genres: Prose, essay, theatre
- Notable work: Pseudokynegeticos

Alexandru Ioan Odobescu (Romanian pronunciation: [alekˈsandru odoˈbesku]; 23 June 1834 – 10 November 1895) was a Romanian author, archaeologist and politician.

== Biography ==
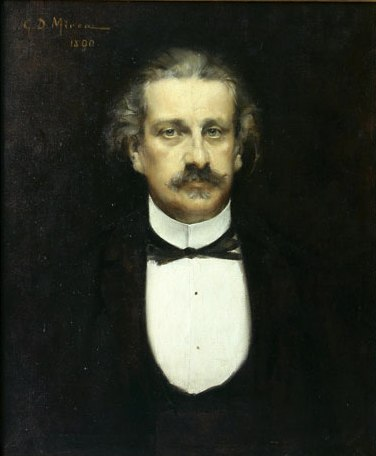
Alexandru Odobescu, portrait by George Demetrescu Mirea

He was born in Bucharest, the second child of General Ioan Odobescu and his wife Ecaterina. Ecaterina belonged to the Caracaș family, originally from modern northern Greece. After attending Saint Sava College and, from 1850, a Paris lycée, Alexandru Odobescu took the baccalauréat in 1853 and studied literature and archaeology at the University of Paris, graduating two years later. In 1858, he married Pavel Kiselyov's daughter Alexandra (Sașa) Prejbeanu; they had one daughter, Ioana. He was often apart from his wife and had affairs with other women.

Odobescu served as cabinet minister for religion and education in 1863, as head clerk at the Ministry of Foreign Affairs in 1865, and as prosecutor at the Court of Appeal. In 1870, he travelled in Switzerland and Italy, in connection with his discovery and description of the Pietroasele treasure, a collection of objects made from precious metals, of Gothic origin, found on Romanian territory; he also travelled to several other countries, including Denmark, Russia and Turkey. He opposed the tendency toward artificially Latinizing the literary Romanian language. He was elected to the Romanian Academy in 1870 and was professor of archaeology at the University of Bucharest from 1874, the year he was named chairman of the National Theatre Bucharest. He served as secretary of the Romanian legation at Paris in 1882, was principal of a teacher-training institute in Bucharest, and principal of the National Educational Institute in 1892. Poor, sick with gout, separated from his wife and daughter, around 1891, he fell passionately in love with Hortensia Racoviță, a geography professor thirty years his junior. She rejected a marriage proposal made by Odobescu's wife, and he committed suicide by morphine overdose in Bucharest in 1895.

== Selected works ==
- Mihnea-Vodă cel rău, 1857
- Doamna Chiajna, 1860
- Câteva ore la Snagov, 1862
- Pseudo-cynegeticos, sau fals tratat de vânătoare, 1875
- Le Trésor de Petrossa, 1889
- Pagini regăsite
- Note de călătorie

Other writings include short stories, several dozen scholarly articles, an anthology of folk tales (among them 1875's "Jupân Rănică Vulpoiul" and "Tigrul păcălit") and one of folk poetry, and a History of Archaeology (1877). He also translated both literary and scholarly works.
