= Hole Runestone =

Runestone in Norway

- Holesteinen
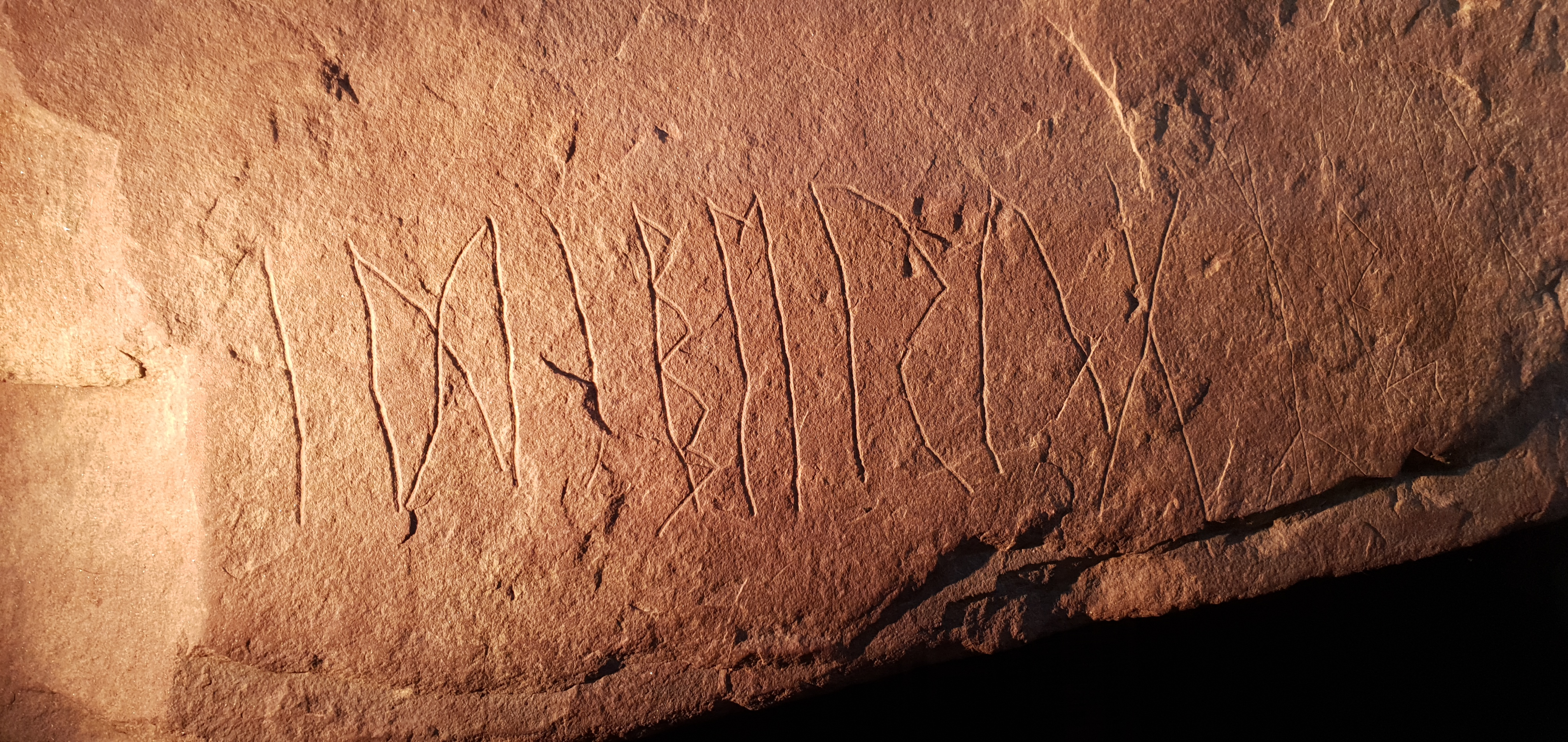
- Type: Runestone
- Material: Red-brown Ringerike sandstone
- Weight: 107 kg (discovered pieces)
- Created: Between 50 BCE and 275 CE
- Discovered: 2021-2023
- Place: Near Tyrifjorden, Hole, Buskerud, Norway
- Present location: Museum of Cultural History, Oslo, Norway
- Language: Proto-Norse, written in Elder Fuþark runes
- Culture: Roman Iron Age (Germanic)

The Hole Runestone is a runestone reconstructed from fragments found at a grave site in Hole in Norway. These pieces include Hole 2 (also referred to as the Svingerud stone). Radiocarbon dating from the graves in which some of the fragments were found dates the runestone to between 50 BCE and 275 CE, during the Roman Iron Age, making it the oldest datable runestone known in the world, and among the oldest known runic inscriptions.

The discovery is additionally notable for the content of its inscriptions in Proto-Norse (a northern development of Proto-Germanic). These include a probable female name, the first three elder fuþark runes in order, and what appears to be a formula for denoting the writer of the runes, seen in other runic inscriptions such as the Einang stone. The inscriptions likely reflect one of the earliest stages of runic literacy, characterised by experimentation in writing styles and shapes.

== Discovery and reconstruction ==
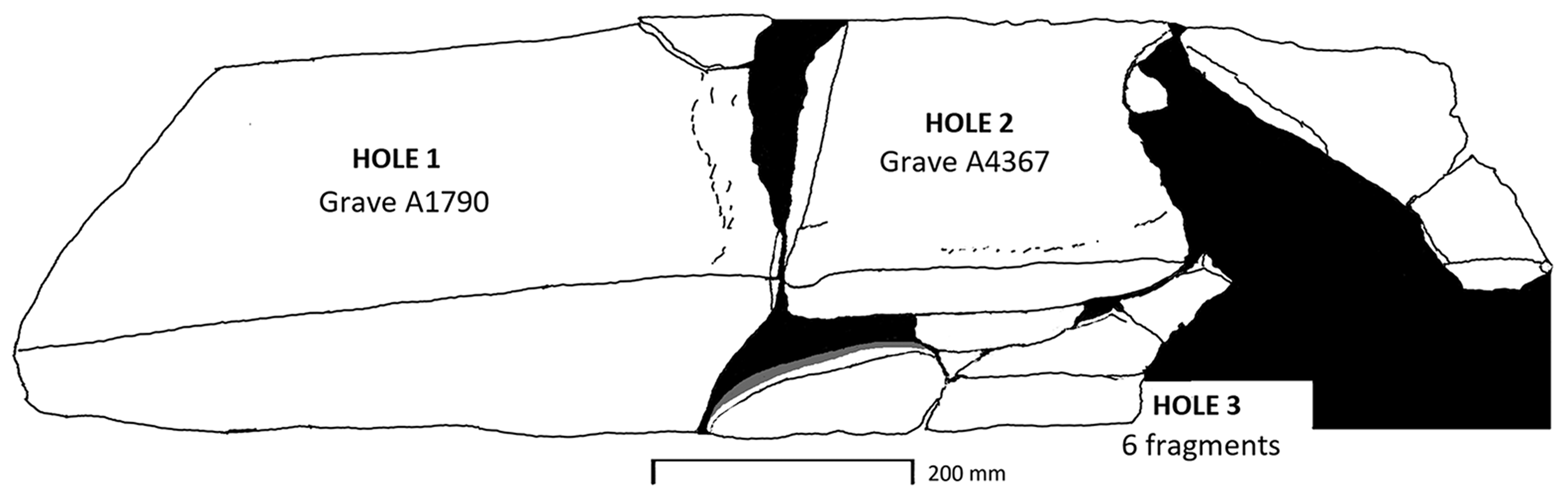
Proposed reconstruction of the runestone from the main fragments of Hole 1, 2 and 3

Archaeologists from the Museum of Cultural History, University of Oslo, discovered red-brown Ringerike sandstone fragments in 2021–2023 that were later reconstructed into the runestone. They were found during investigations of the Svingerud grave field, close to the farm of Hole, near Tyrifjorden, Norway.

The main rune-inscribed slab, known as Hole 2 or the Svingerud stone (Svingerudsteinen), was discovered in 2021 in a flat grave beside a grave mound. It weighs 9.6 kg and measures roughly 30 x 31 cm. In another probable grave beside Hole 2, Hole 1 was found, an uninscribed slab weighing around 67 kg. In 2022, excavations near these graves unearthed four fragments which fit together to form a runic inscription, Hole 3. Also in 2022, four fragments were discovered which fit together with Hole 1 and Hole 2. Other fragments were found in other contexts in the grave field, with systematic sieving of soil in 2023 leading to the discovery of approximately 160 further pieces less than 2 cm in length. These included matching pieces to Hole 1 and Hole 2 and also two further pieces of Hole 3, which now consists of 6 fragments.

Hole 1, Hole 2 and the 6 fragments constituting Hole 3 have been shown to be part of the same slab of sandstone, referred to as the Hole runestone, after the find site. Despite this, the different inscriptions were not necessarily made at the same time and by the same writer. The 12 main pieces of the runestone together weigh 107 kg, but substantial parts of the runestone are still missing.

== Dating ==
The Hole 2 fragment was from a mound with grave goods radiocarbon dated to between 50 BCE and 275 CE. The other burials were dated to approximately the same time, with the grave containing Hole 1 likely being from before 150 CE. Such dates are consistent with graves of a similar style from elsewhere in Norway.

Based on this, the Hole runestone is the oldest datable runestone and is among the oldest known runic inscriptions. It is also the only runestone found in a datable archaeological context, suggesting that others, such as the Hogganvik and Tune stones, may also be older than typically thought.

== Inscriptions ==
=== Language ===
The language of the inscriptions has been considered Proto-Norse, or Ancient Nordic, following the convention for runic writing around Scandinavia in the time period from the mid-2nd to late 7th centuries CE. Consistent with this, the inscriptions of Hole 2 and 3 seem to show North Germanic linguistic features.

=== Hole 2 ===
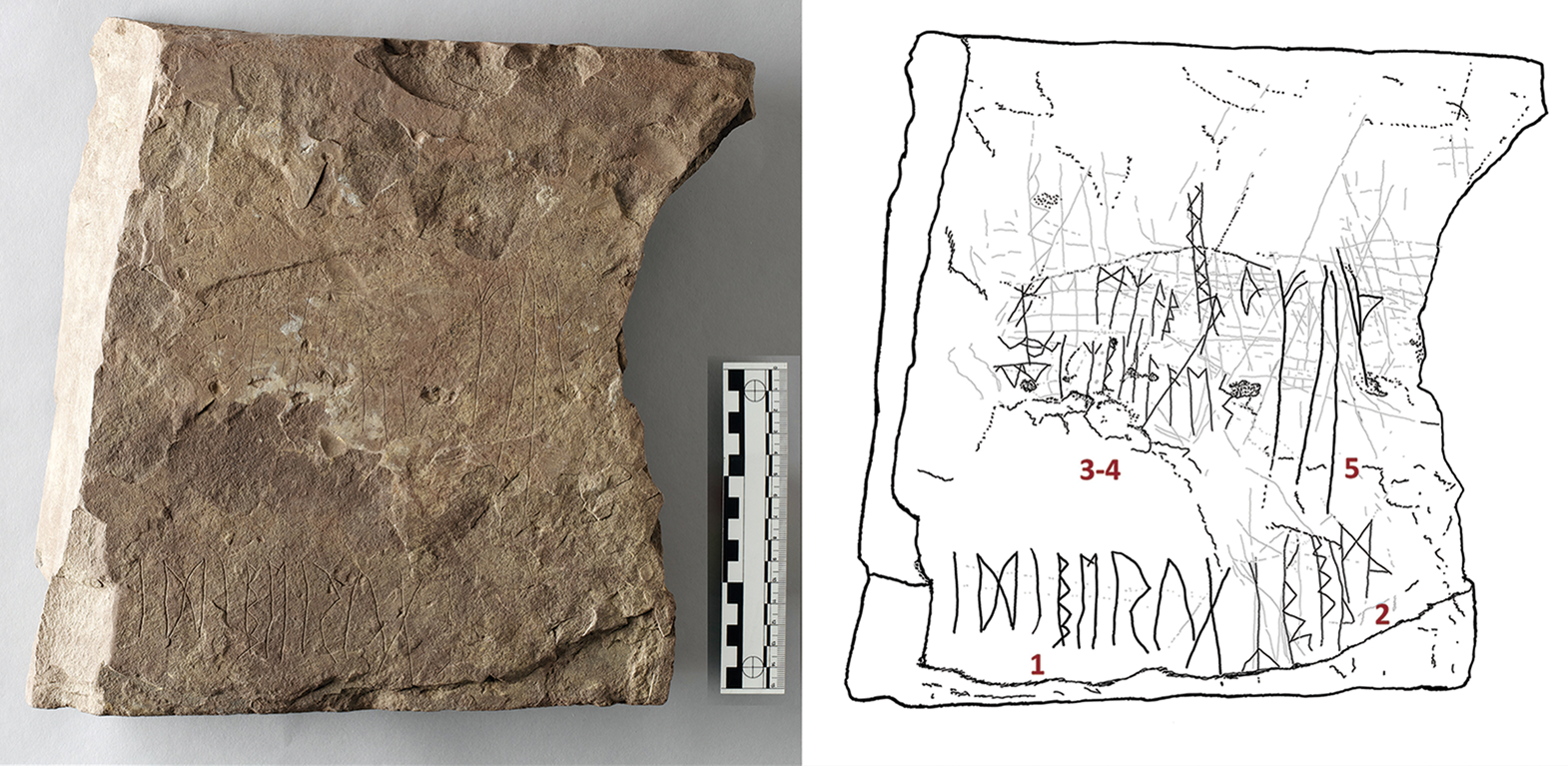
The Hole 2 fragment, showing the idiberug (1) and fuþ (5) inscriptions

==== idiberug sequence ====
The Hole 2 fragment has several identifiable sequences of runes. Eight runes are clearer than the others on one side and form a left-to-right sequence. Transliterated into Latin script, they read either idiberug or possibly idiberun, given the similarity between the ᚷ (g) and ᚾ (n) runes. The b rune is unusual, having four pockets, but resembles others on the fragment.

Several interpretations are possible, as is common with early runic inscriptions; however it likely includes a proper name. One possibility is the female name idibergu. In this case, the first element *idi- could be an intensifier, indicating long duration, and be related to names such as Iðunn and Iðmundr. The etymology of this is uncertain, however. The second part of the name could be related to Proto-Germanic: *-bergō and Old Norse: -bjǫrg ('help', 'protection'), or bera, possibly related to *beran- ('to bear'). A name such as Idibergu would be paralleled by attested names such as Old High German Iduberga and the southern Germanic Bera. Alternatively, idibernu could be interpreted as a dedication (possibly of the stone or inscription) 'for/to Īdiberō'. A further possible reading includes a faintly scratched z as part of the end of the sequence to give idiberu[n]g[a]z. This could be a kin name, with the suffix *-ungaz ('descendant') being well attested in the early Germanic record.

==== fuþ sequence ====
The three runes ᚠ ('f'), ᚢ ('u') and ᚦ ('þ' or 'th') comprise another sequence on Hole 2. These are the first three runes of the elder fuþark rune-row. It is possible that this sequence is therefore a rendering of the fuþark and may reflect an early knowledge of the rune-row as a defined, ordered concept. Complete and almost complete elder fuþark inscriptions are known elsewhere, with the Kylver stone, typically dated to around 400 CE, being widely considered the oldest. These runes resemble those of the idiberug sequence and were possibly carved using a similar tool.

=== Hole 3 ===
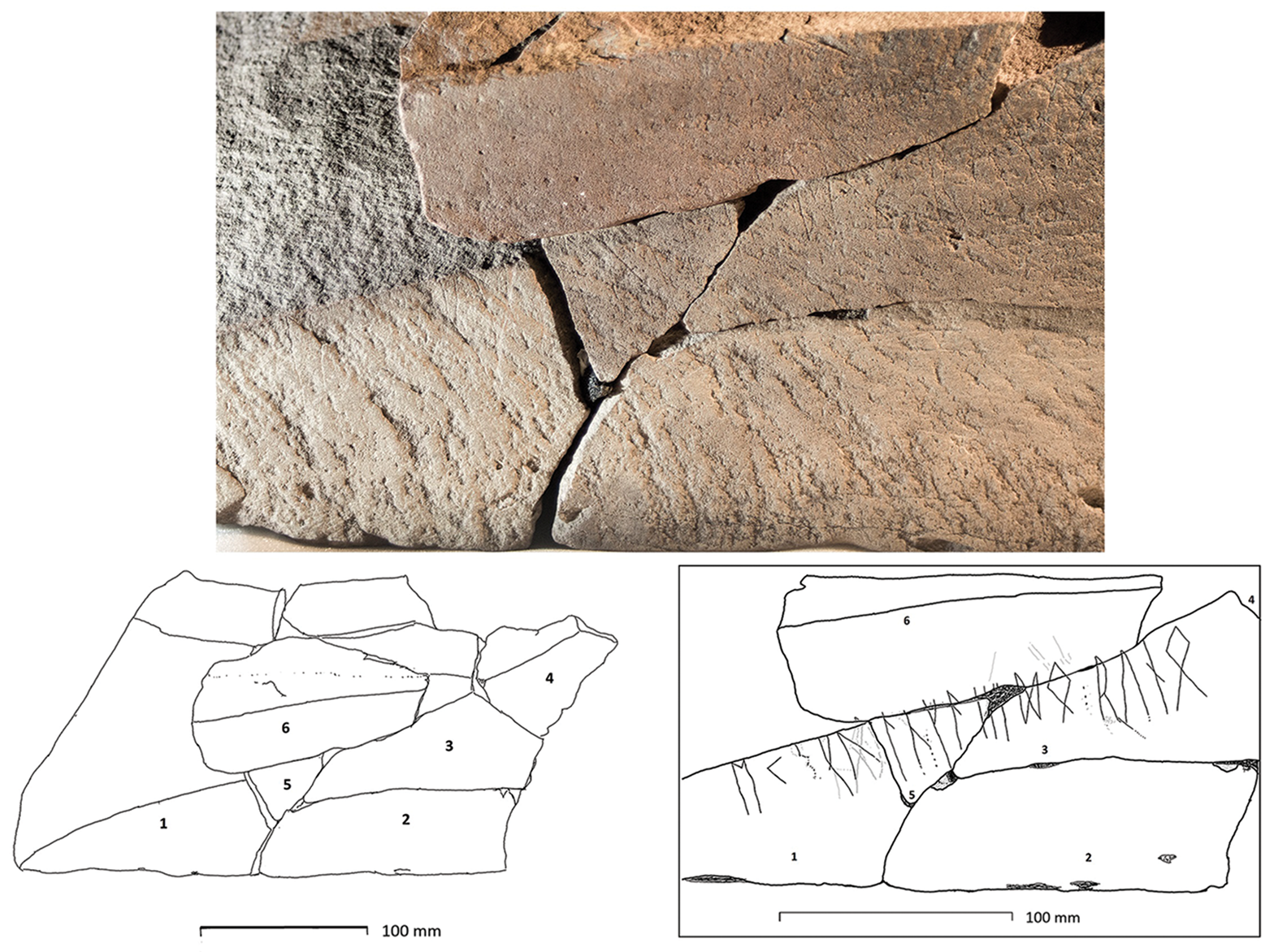
The 6 assembled pieces of Hole 3 and its inscription

The Hole 3 fragments have a sequence of 16 or 17 runes with at least two sets of dots acting as separator marks between some of them. Several of the runes are split across fragments and some are damaged. They read ek(s)g(or w)ulu:fahido:runo (ᛖᚲ(ᛋ)ᚷ(or: ᚹ)ᚢᛚᚢ:ᚠᚨᚺᛁᛞᛟ:ᚱᚢᚾᛟ), in which the s (ᛋ) is faint and possibly not a rune, and the following rune is either a g or w (ᚷ or ᚹ). This has been interpreted as follows:

ᛖᚲ {(ᛋ)ᚷ(or: ᚹ)ᚢᛚᚢ}: {} ᚠᚨᚺᛁᛞᛟ: ᚱᚢᚾᛟ
Ek {Gul(l)u/Wu(l)lu (or: Skul(l)u/Swul(l)u)} {} fahidō rūnō
I, Gu(l)lu/Wul(l)u (or: Skul(l)u/Swul(l)u), wrote the runic inscription

The names Gul(l)u or Wul(l)u are more likely than Skul(l)u or Swul(l)u given the faintness of the s and the possibility that it is a separator instead, as is seen elsewhere in the sequence. Gulu could be derived from Proto Norse: *gulu ('yellow; gold'). The same runes may instead represent the name Gullu ('she who shouts/sings'), related to Proto-Germanic: *galan- ('to shout') or *gellan ('to yell/sound'). If this reading is correct, it would notably be the earliest recording of a female writer. Alternatively, the name Wullu may mean 'the woolly one' or be related to Proto-Germanic: *wulan ('to swell up, boil, seethe').

The verb fahido is a form of *faihijan ('to paint, decorate, write'). The inscription was scratched using a thin tool, making the meaning 'wrote' most fitting. It may also suggest, however, that the writer was aware of a custom at the time of decorating or colouring runic sequences. The formula used in the sequence is seen elsewhere in runic inscriptions, such as the Einang stone, which reads [Ek Go]dagastiz rūnō faihidō ('I, Godagastiz, wrote (or painted) the runic inscription'). In both inscriptions, runo ('rune') is in the singular, referring to the entire inscription. On the Hole stone, however, monophthongisation before the h is seen (fahido, rather than the Einang stone's faihido). This spelling is also seen on the Rö runestone (dated to c. 60-375/400 CE). As the change is a regular development in Proto Norse, it may suggest that the Hole stone inscription was made after others that lack the innovation. Alternatively, the Hole stone could be older but the sound change took time to spread, and the monophthongisation had not been adopted in areas such as Einang by the time their inscriptions were carved.

=== Other ===
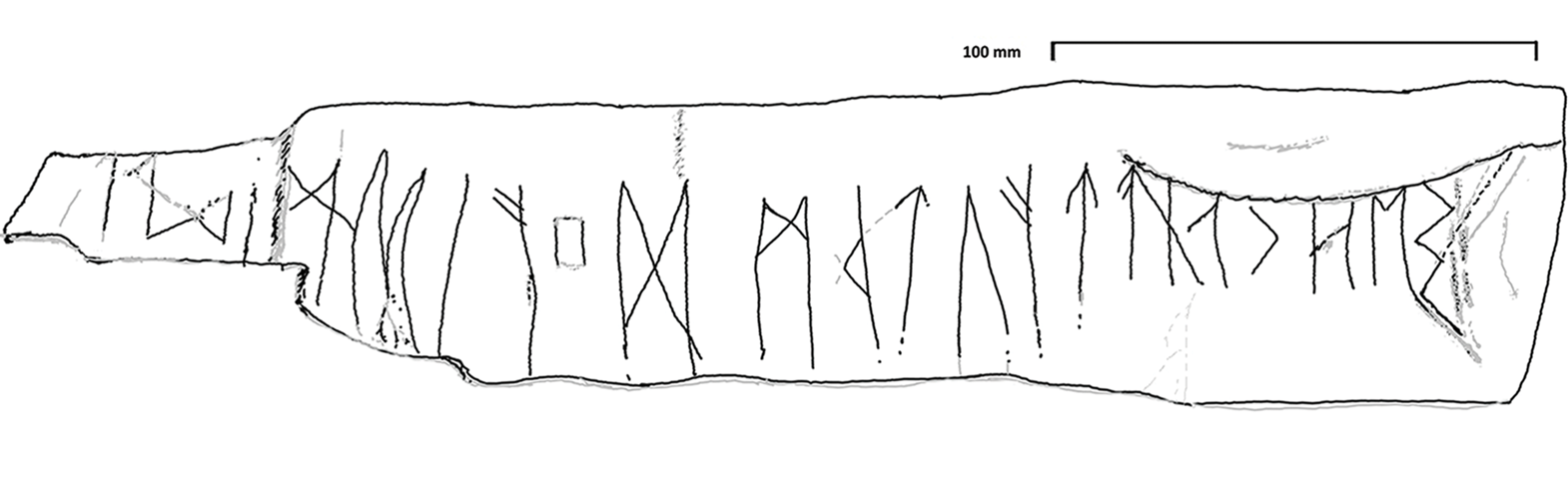
Inscription on the side of Hole 2 without clear interpretation.

The fragments contain several other sequences of runes that are harder to interpret and make suggestions more speculative. These include an inscription with many consonants but few vowels that could reflect abbreviations or a record of different rune shapes. In other cases, it is unclear if certain carvings are intended to be runes, or which runes they are intended to be.

== Function ==
The Hole runestone consists of fragments with highly diverse properties and inscriptions. A number of differing interpretations have accordingly been put forward, both for before and after the runestone was broken.

As the largest fragment, Hole 1, lacks an inscription and was found vertically, it has been suggested to have been the base of an upright standing stone that was possibly supported by two stones found beside it. Hole 2 and 3 were likely removed from Hole 1 on purpose. After this, the inscription made on the side of Hole 2 was written and it was deposited in the grave in which it was discovered. Given this deposition of fragments in graves, the runestone could have had a ceremonial and memorialising role. This would align with common interpretations of other early runestones and the possible recording of a name by the idiberug sequence. Despite this, Hole 2 does not appear to be monumental and may instead be a recycled fragment.

Hole 2 has several notable features beyond the sequences which appear to have a semantic meaning. One of these is a grid with runes and other marks nearby, which may be associated with board games. Alternatively, it may have been used for timetelling, possibly under influence from Roman sundials. Elsewhere on Hole 2, the scribbled markings may reflect use as a writing tablet. In this case, the inscriptions could reflect writers copying from other inscriptions to practise and develop new forms of writing, consistent with rare rune shapes seen, such as the four-pocket b in the idiberug sequence. The Hole runestone could therefore attest to an early period of runic writing in which the writing was an emergent skill that carvers were learning to master. Repeated rune motifs could alternatively have had another meaning which has yet be identified.

== Exhibition ==
The University of Oslo placed the stone on public exhibition from January 2023 until late February 2023.

== See also ==
- Einang stone, another ancient runestone from Norway which has previously been called one of the oldest
- Meldorf fibula, a metal fibula found in Schleswig-Holstein which features rune-like writing, dated to around 50 CE
- Negau helmets, of which Negau-B is dated to 300–350 BCE and features the oldest known writing in a Germanic language
- Vimose comb, another candidate for the earliest known runic inscription, a wooden comb found deposited in a bog in Denmark and dated to about 150 CE

== Bibliography ==
=== Academic articles ===
- Solheim, Steinar; Zilmer, Kristel; Zawalska, Judyta; Vasshus, Krister Sande Kristoffersen; Sand-Eriksen, Anette; Kimball, Justin J.L.; Havstein, John Asbjørn Munch (2025). "Inscribed Sandstone Fragments of Hole, Norway: Radiocarbon Dates Provide Insight into Rune-Stone Traditions". Antiquity: 1–18. doi:10.15184/aqy.2024.225.
- Zilmer, K.; Vasshus, K.S.K. (2023). "Runic fragments from the Svingerud grave field in Norway: earliest datable evidence of runic writing on stone". NOWELE: North-Western European Language Evolution. 76: 233–303. doi:10.1075/nowele.00080.zil.

=== Media reports ===
- Biørnstad, Lasse (5 February 2025). "Researchers found more pieces of the world's oldest runestone – may change the history of runes". Science Norway.
- Olsen, Jan M. (17 January 2023). "Norway archaeologists find 'world's oldest runestone'". AP News.
- "The world's oldest rune stone". Historisk Museum.
- Gulliksen, Øivind (17 January 2023). "Found the world's oldest rune stone". Kulturhistorisk museum.
