= Grumpan bracteate =

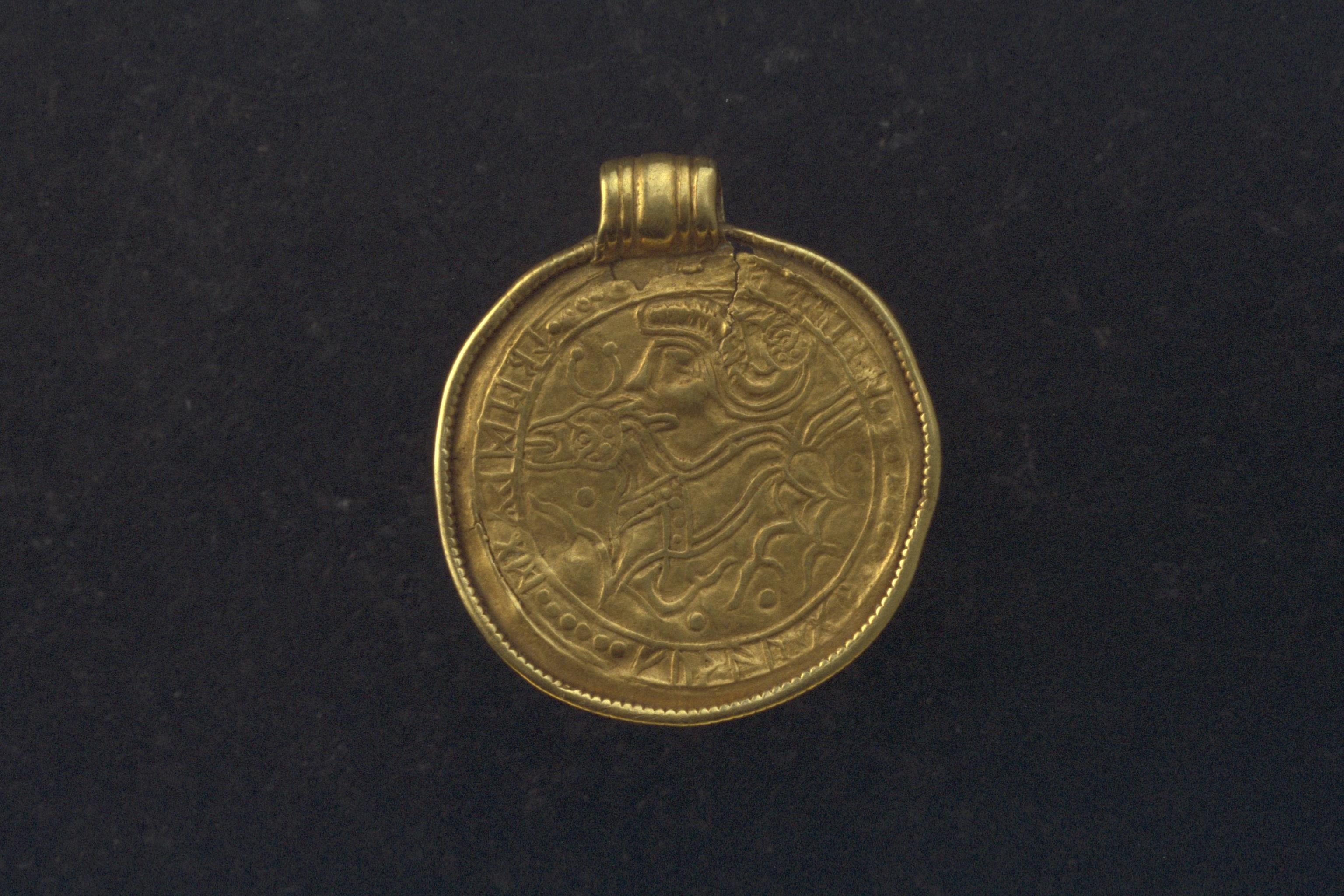
The Grumpan bracteate

The Grumpan bracteate, designated as runic inscription Vg 207 by Rundata, is a gold type C bracteate found in Västergötland, Sweden, in 1911. It is dated to the 6th century and features a full list of elder futhark runes in order.

== Runic inscription ==
The Grumpan bracteate was found together with two other bracteates, two gold rings, two bronze hooks, and some glass beads. It is notable as an early attestation of the division of the elder futhark row into three groups or ættir of eight runes each ætt. On the Grumpan bracteate, the runes of each ætt are separated by a row of dots.

The following is a drawing of the inscription made by Sigurd Agrell (Lapptrummor och Runmagi, 1934):

ᚠᚢᚦᚨᚱᚲᚷᚹ ᛫ ᚺᚾᛁᛃᛇᛈ… ᛫ ᛏᛒᛖᛗᛚ…ᛞ
fuþarkgw : hnijïp[zs] : tbeml(ŋ)(o)d

The Grumpan bracteate is damaged at the upper end near the eyelet, at the end of the second ætt, so that the z and s runes are no longer readable. The rune transcribed above as (ŋ) actually has the shape of the elder futhark z rune but is placed in the location for the ŋ rune.

Full listings of the elder futhark are known from the beginning of the 5th century, with the Kylver stone, and other early examples such as the Vadstena bracteate and the Charnay Fibula. The sequences of the runes in the futhark given in these listings are mostly in agreement, except for the possible inversions of the positions of the p and ï and of d and o runes.

It is believed that bracteates such as that found at Grumpan were used as amulets with the futhark inscription part of the amulet's magical power.
