= Eggja stone =

Runestone in Norway

Coordinates: 61.2395°N 7.0524°E

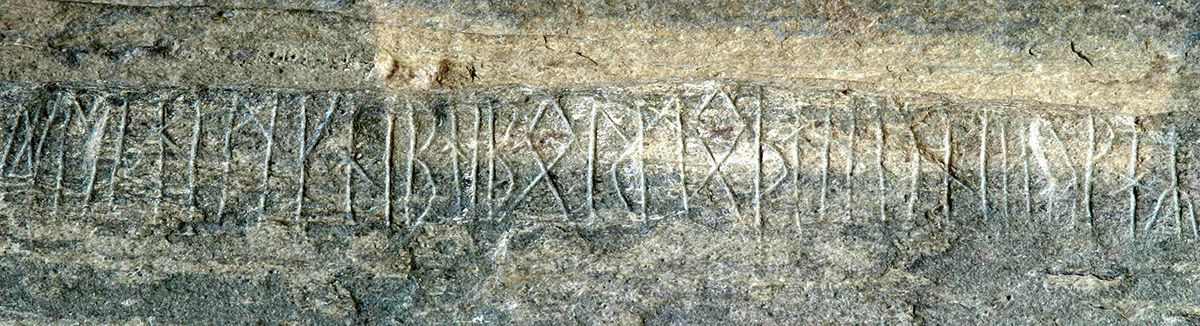
Runic inscription on the Eggja stone (ca. 600–700 c.e) from Sogndal, Norway.

The Eggja stone (also known as the Eggum or Eggjum stone), listed as N KJ101 in the Rundata catalog, is a grave stone with a runic inscription that was ploughed up in 1917 on the farm Eggja in Sogndal Municipality, Nordre Bergenhus amt (now in Vestland county), Norway.

== Description ==
The Eggja stone was found with the written side downwards over a man's grave (cf. the Kylver stone) which is dated to the period 650–700 C.E. The flat slab of stone is nowadays in Bergen Museum. Having as many as 200 runes, it is the longest known inscription in the Elder Futhark, but certain runes are transitional towards the Younger Futhark.

Many scholarly works have been written about the inscription, but only minor parts of the partially preserved inscription have received an accepted translation. It is generally agreed it is written in stylized poetry and in a partly metrical form containing a protection for the grave and the description of a funerary rite. However, there are widely diverging interpretations about certain details.

There is also the image of a horse carved into the stone, but it does not appear to have any connection with the inscription.

== Inscriptions ==
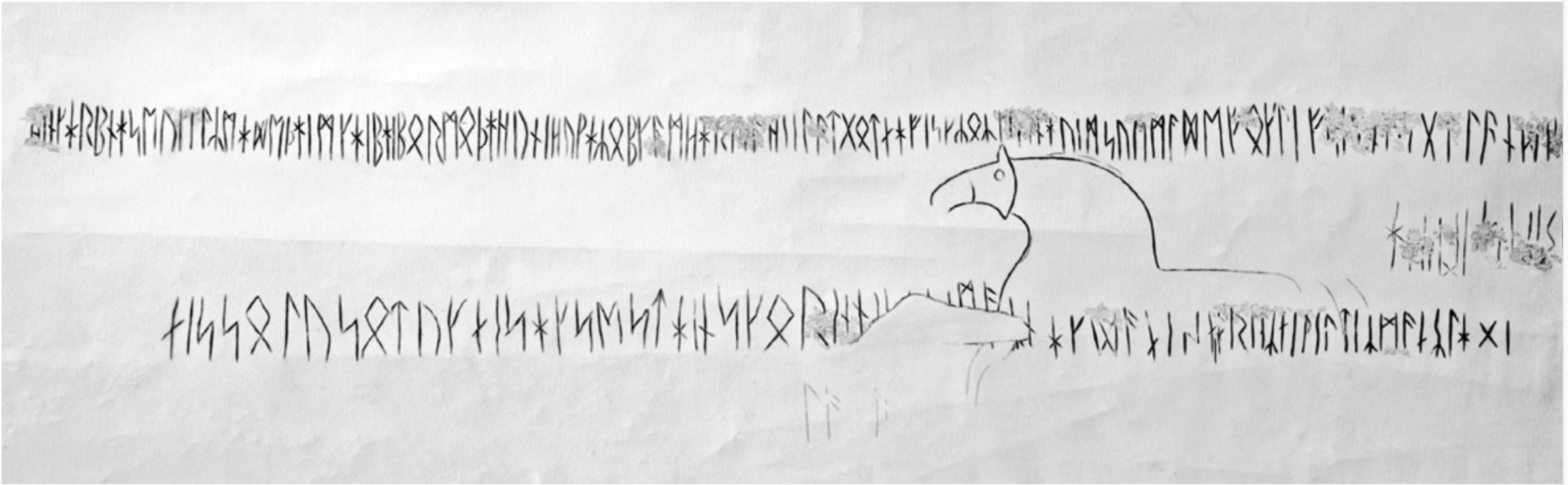
Drawing of the entire inscription

=== Transliteration ===
The following transcription mostly copies the graphic analysis provided by Ottar Grønvik (1985). Some of the individual characters are unclear, and other analyses may disagree with certain parts. (For example, Grønvik analyzed fokl as foki.)

- Panel 1:

nissolusotuknisᴀksestᴀin
skorinni????mąʀnᴀkdąnisn?r?ʀ
niwiltiʀmąnʀlᴀgi??

- Panel 2:

hinwᴀrbnᴀseuwilʀmᴀdeþᴀim
kᴀibᴀibormoþᴀhunihuwᴀʀob
kąmhᴀr??ąhiąlątgotnᴀfiskʀ
oʀf???ᴀuimsuwimądefokl?f?ą
????gąląnde

- Panel 3:

ᴀ???isurki

=== Translations ===
Krause and Jankuhn (1966)

Wolfgang Krause and Herbert Jankuhn, Die Runeninschriften im älteren Futhark (1966) offered the following interpretation:

- Panel 1:

Ni's sólu sótt ok ni saxe stæin skorinn.
Ni (læggi) mannʀ nækðan, is niþ rinnʀ,
Ni viltiʀ mænnʀ læggi ax.

- Panel 2:

Hin(n) varp *náséo mannʀ, máðe þæim kæipa í bormóþa húni.
Huæaʀ of kam hæráss á hi á land gotna.
Fiskʀ óʀ f(ir)na uim suim(m)ande, fogl á f??????? galande.

- Panel 3:

Alu misyrki

Based on this reconstruction, the following translation is offered:

- Panel 1:

"It is not touched by the sun and the stone is not scored by an [iron] knife. No man may lay [it] bare, when the waning moon runs [across the heavens]. Misguided men may not lay [the stone] aside. "

The stone has been prepared in accordance with tradition; the stone is untouched by sunlight, and not cut with iron. It should not be uncovered during the waning moon, and should not be removed from its place.

- Panel 2:

"The man sprinkled this [stone] with corpse-sea (blood), with it he rubbed the tholes of the well drilled boat. As who came the army-god hither onto the land of warriors? A fish swimming out of the terrible stream, a bird screaming into the enemy band"

Someone has stained this stone with blood (kenned as corpse-sea); perhaps as part of a sacrifice to facilitate the passage of the deceased or call on whatever power the inscription is addressed to. The heráss is the "god of armies" - a psychopomp god (i.e. an early form of Odin) who comes to the land of the living to take the deceased to an afterlife.

- Panel 3:

"Protection against the wrong-doer"

Grønvik (1985)

Ottar Grønvik (1985) offers a more prosaic interpretation. Panel 3 above is relegated to the middle, as part B:

A1 (hiu þwer) hin warp naseu wilʀ made þaim kaiba i bormoþa huni
A2 huwaʀ ob kam harie a hit lat
A3 gotna fiskʀ oʀ firnauim suwimade foki af (f)a(nwan)ga lande
B a(i a)u is urki
C1 ni s solu sot uk ni sakse stain skorin
C2 ni (witi) maʀ nakdan is na wrinʀ ni wiltiʀ manʀ lagi(s)

(Parenthesis denotes reconstructed or anticipated forms)

The Old Norse equivalent is here said to be:

A1 Hjú þverr, hín varp násjó *Vill: máðe þeim keipa i bormóða húni.
A2 Hverr of kom her á hitt land?
A3 Gotna fiskr ór firney-ím, svimande foki af fán-vanga lande.
B Æ ey es yrki!
C1 Ne's sólu sótt, ok ne sakse, stein skorinn;
C2 ne víti maðr, nǫkðan es ná rinn, ne viltir menn, lægis!

Translation:

A1 The household wanes, *Vil threw a death wave over those

The oarlocks wore out for, with the tired mast-top

A2 Who brought the horde to the land afar?
A3 The godly-fish from Firnøy’s streams

Swimming in the drift of the land of shining meadows.

B Be it of help, I work this.
C1 Not has the sun seen, nor the sword shorn, this stone,
C2 Do not seek who call forth the naked dead,

Nor wildly men, this bed of rest!

According to this interpretation, A1 is a description of a shipwreck in bad weather. The mast seems to have broken, and the oars could not save them, as a mythical creature, *Vil (possibly the sea-god Aegir, or simply divine will,) casts a wave upon the boat. Parts A2, A3 and B explains the fate of the deceased. As A2 asks how they will get to the land beyond, A3 replies that a divine creature in the shape of a fish will lead them to the land of shining meadows. Part B prays that the work of the one writing this will help. Firney is probably not a place name, but possibly Fear-island or Far-island, and a kenning for the realm of the dead. Part C1 says that the inscription was done at night, and not by using steel. This probably pertains to ancient grave-rituals, but the exact meaning is unclear. C2 issues warning directed at necromancers and mad (or mentally ill) people to prevent them from desecrating the grave.

== Meter ==
Panel 2 has been suggested to contain a stanza in the Galdralag meter, i.e.:

Hvaʀ of kom hęráss á
hí á land gotna?
Fiskʀ óʀ f(ir)na-vim svim(m)ande,
fogl á f(...) galande.

Which harrier-god came
here onto the land of men?
A fish out of shocking wavering, swimming,
a fowl, on f(...), crowing

The inscription loosely follows the pattern of the Merseburg Incantations, divided into two complementary parts, but where the Merseburger invokes a mythic event and calls for an exorcistic repetition, the Eggja composer seems to twice invoke a ritual, the first time listing two desired outcomes, in the second instance asking a question and answering it. Both inscriptions may represent some of the few remaining examples of pre-Christian ljoð or galdr, ritual verse chanted by the cult leaders, shamans or oracles of Norse Scandinavia.

== In popular culture ==
Neo-folk band Heilung's songs Krigsgaldr and Hakkerskaldyr have lyrics from Grønvik's translation of the Eggja inscription.

Min warb naseu
Wilr made thaim
I bormotha hauni

Hu war (hu war)
Hu war opkam har a hit lot
Got nafiskr orf
Auim suimade
Foki afa galande

Hu war (hu war)
Hu war opkam har a hit lot

== See also ==
- Alu (runic)
- List of runestones

== Other sources ==
- M. Olsen, 'Norges Indskrifter med de ældre Runer' (Christiania), Vol. III, pt. 2.
- The article Eggjastenen in Nationalencyklopedin 1991.
