= Ottar Grønvik =

Norwegian philologist and runologist (1916–2008)

Ottar Nicolai Grønvik (21 October 1916 – 15 May 2008) was a Norwegian philologist and runologist.

He was a lecturer from 1959 and associate professor from 1965 to 1986 at the University of Oslo. His doctoral thesis, which earned him the dr.philos. degree in 1981, was Runene på Tunesteinen. He was best known for his work on the runic alphabet and various runestones, especially the Tune Runestone, the Rök runestone and the Eggjum stone.

== Bibliography ==
- Luthertexte für sprachgeschichtliche und grammatische Übungen [Texts by Luther for exercises in historical linguistics and grammar] (1960)
- Runene på Tunesteinen: alfabet, språkform, budskap (1981)
- The Words for "Heir", "Inheritance", and "Funeral Feast" in Early Germanic (1982)
- Die dialektgeographische Stellung des Krimgotischen und die krimgotische cantilena [The position of Crimean Gothic in dialect geography and the Crimean Gothic cantilena] (1983)
- Runene på Eggjasteinen: en hedensk gravinnskrift fra slutten av 600-tallet (1985)
- Über den Ursprung und die Entwicklung der aktiven Perfekt- und Plusquamperfektkonstruktionen des Hochdeutschen und ihre Eigenart innerhalb des germanischen Sprachraumes [On the origin and development of the active perfect and pluperfect constructions of High German and their peculiarities within the Germanic linguistic area] (1986)
- Fra Ågedal til Setre: sentrale runeinnskrifter fra det 6. århundre (1987)
- Fra Vimose til Ødemotland : nye studier over runeinnskrifter fra førkristen tid i Norden (1996)
- Untersuchungen zur älteren nordischen und germanischen Sprachgeschichte [Studies in older Norse and Germanic linguistic history] (1998)
- Der Rökstein: Über die religiöse Bestimmung und das weltliche Schicksal eines Helden aus der frühen Wikingerzeit [The Rök Stone: Of the religious destiny and worldly fate of a hero in the early Viking era] (2003)
