= Charnay Fibula =

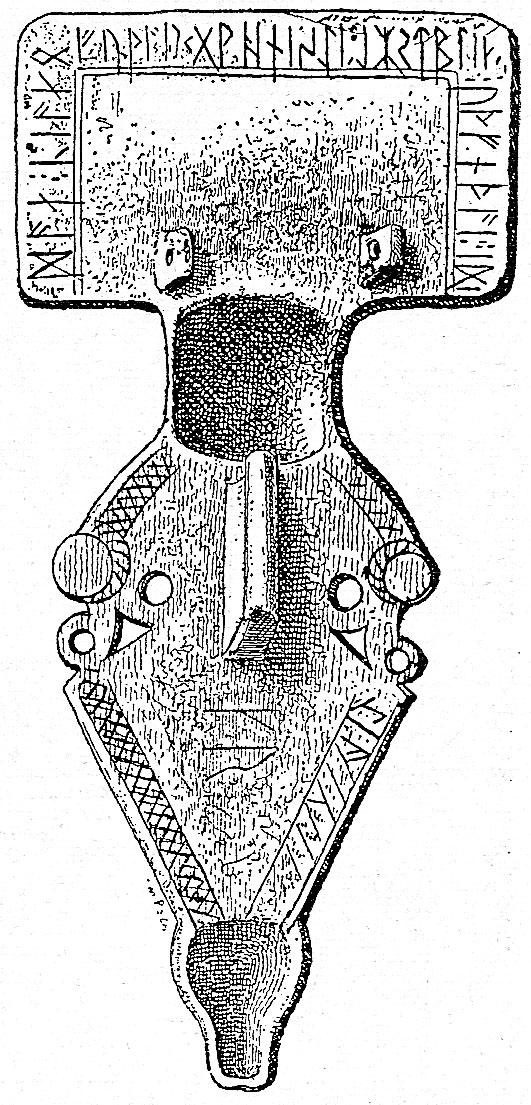
The Charnay Fibula

The Charnay Fibula is a mid-6th century fibula or brooch which was discovered in Burgundy in 1857. It has a runic inscription consisting of a horizontal partial listing of the first twenty of the twenty-four rune sequence of the Elder Futhark:

fuþarkgwhnijïpzstbem

The full listing of the elder futhark is known from the inscription on the Kylver Stone (early 5th century). The shape of the z rune algiz and the p rune peorð differ somewhat from that of other known elder futhark inscriptions. The missing four final runes of the row (lŋdo) seem to be cut off because there was not enough space.

The remaining inscription consists of two undeciphered vertical lines, and two short sequences on the lower part of the fibula:

:uþfnþai:id
dan:liano:
ïia
kr

One published interpretation makes this mean "May Liano discover (be led to) Iddan", supposedly in the Burgundian language. The inscription would here appear to be a charm to obtain a lover. The same authors read the remaining two sequences as "Chr[ist]. Iaô", an abbreviation for Christ and a Gnostic word for God the Father.

== Other sources ==
- The article Charnay Fibula in the Encyclopædia Britannica online.

== See also ==
- Runic magic
