= Penrith Hoard =

Hoard of 10th century brooches

Coordinates: 54.6514°N 2.8322°W

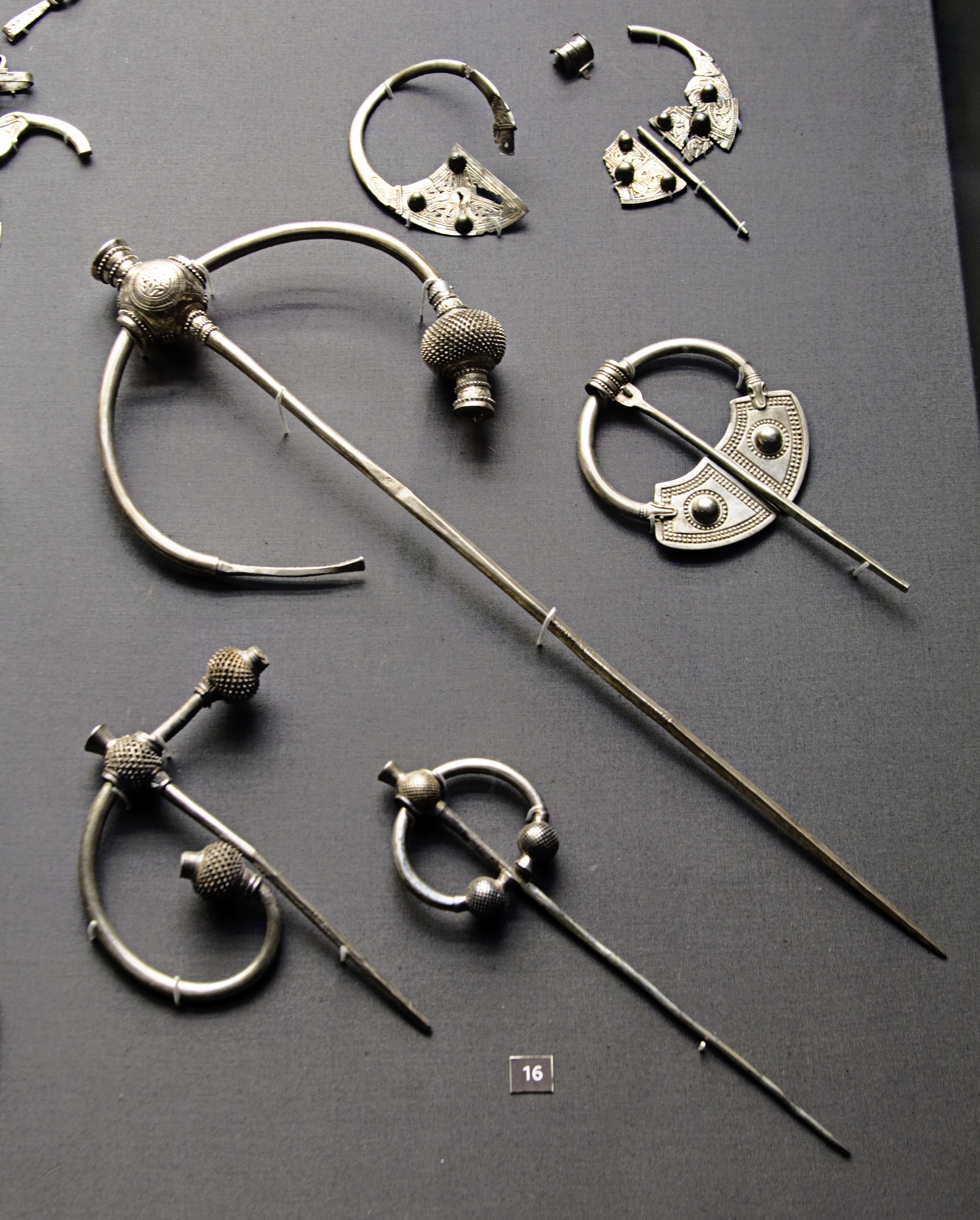
- Brooches found in 1830 (largest) and 1989
- Material: Silver
- Size: Several silver penannular brooches
- Created: 10th century
- Period/culture: Viking
- Discovered: Newbiggin Moor, Near Penrith in 1785-1989
- Present location: British Museum, London

The Penrith Hoard is a dispersed hoard of 10th century silver penannular brooches found at Flusco Pike, Newbiggin Moor, near Penrith in Cumbria, and now in the British Museum in London. The largest "thistle brooch" was discovered in 1785 and another in 1830, with the bulk of items being recovered in two groups close to each other by archaeologists in 1989. Whether all the finds made close to each other were originally deposited at the same time remains uncertain, but it is thought likely that at least the brooches were. The brooches are thought to have been deposited in about 930.

== Discoveries ==
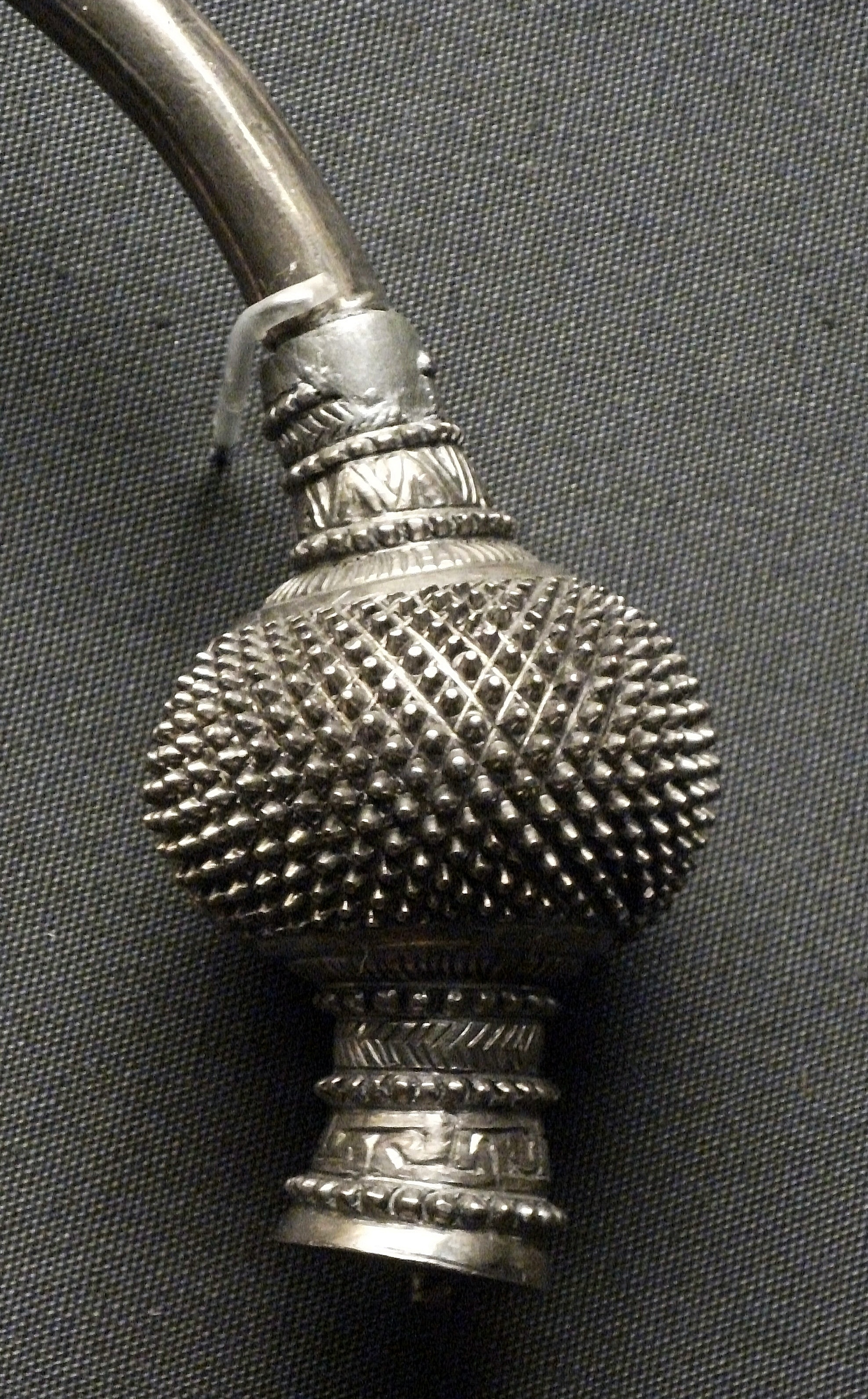
The "brambled" terminal of the largest brooch in the main picture.

The earliest surviving finds were discovered in what was already called the "Silver Field" on Newbiggin Moor by a small boy in 1785, the name suggesting earlier finds, now lost, had been made. In 1830 another smaller thistle brooch was found. Although the exact find spot is not known, this brooch is strongly suspected to have also come from the "Silver Field". The usual reason for a hoard being "dispersed" is that routine farming operations like ploughing can move some items of a single hoard before they are discovered.

Later archaeological investigations in 1989 at the same spot revealed other silver items which confirmed this was a dispersed hoard and not a solitary loss of one brooch. Two groups of items were found in nearby fields: one consisted of five Viking brooches, with fragments of two more, and the other of more than fifty items comprising coins, ingots, jewellery and hacksilver (jewellery and other silver pieces chopped up) of a very similar date. The brooches were declared to be "treasure trove" at an inquest held in Penrith on 23 July 1990, and entered the British Museum in 1991, joined by the other hoard in 2009.

== Context ==
The penannular brooch, originally a common utilitarian clothes fastening—normally of base metal—in Roman Britain, developed in the post-Roman period into highly elaborate and decorative marks of status in Ireland and Scotland. The brooches, worn by both men and women, were made in precious metals and often decorated with gems. When the Vikings began to raid and settle the British Isles, they took to wearing these brooches, but now in plain silver. The thistle and bossed types represented in the hoard were the most popular styles, both developing out of earlier Celtic styles.

It has been speculated that the hoard, with items strongly suggesting an Irish connection, is connected with the events of 927, a date which matches the style of the finds. In that year "the kings of Strathclyde and Scotland came south to Penrith to pay homage to Athelstan". Also in the area with his army was the troublesome Norse-Gael king of Dublin, Gofraid ua Ímair, or Gothfrith. Athelstan made the kings, who had apparently been associating with pagan Vikings like Gothrith, renounce idolatry, but "Gothfrith and company had slipped away in order to attack York". After briefly making himself king of Northumbria there, he was chased out and replaced by Athelstan later in the year, and went back to Ireland. At some point during these manoeuvres the hoards may have been deposited.

== Items discovered ==
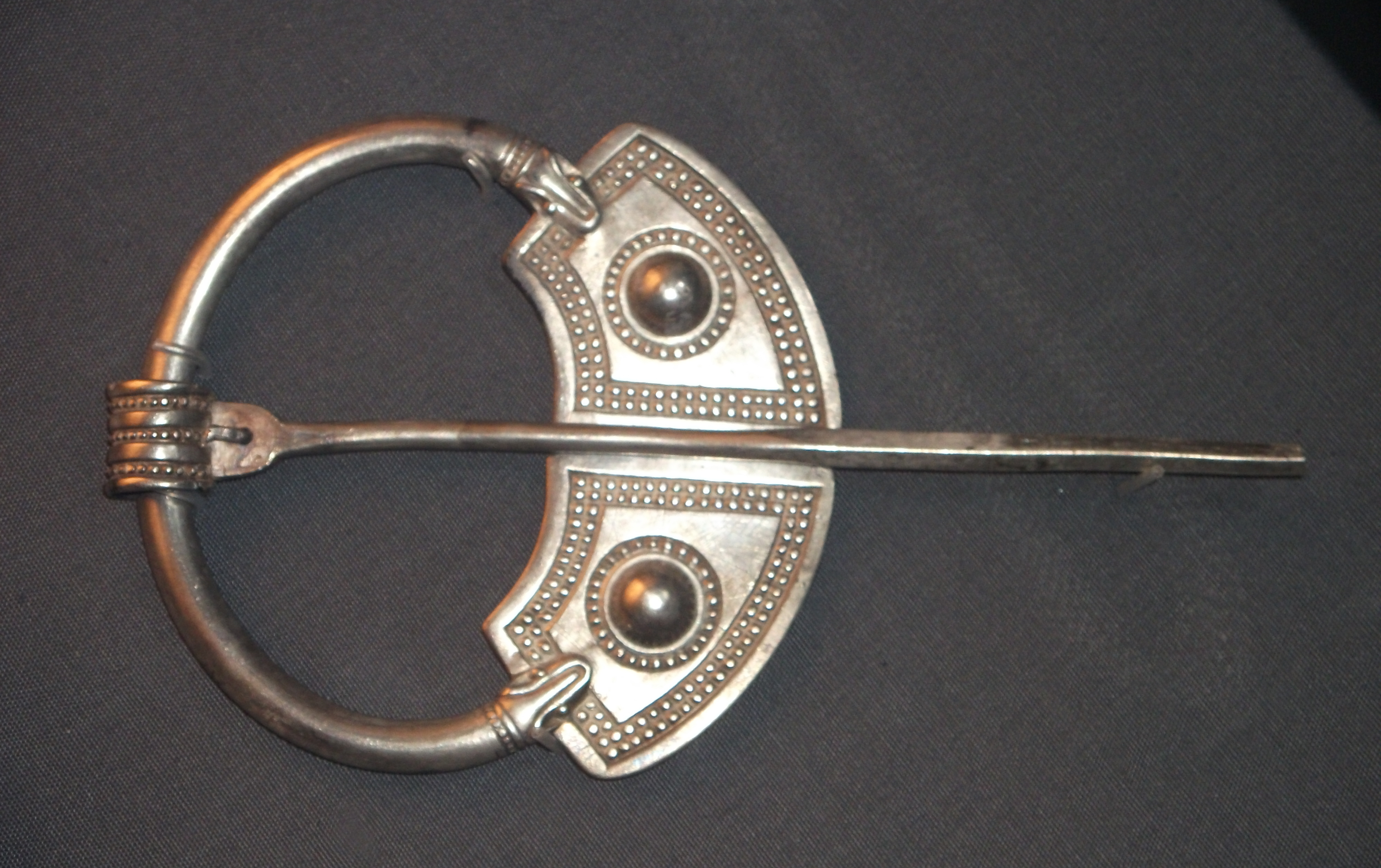
Penannular brooch with "gripping beasts" connecting the ring to the terminals, and a runic futhark scratched on the reverse of the hoop.

The large thistle brooch soon passed to the Leverian Museum, a private museum in Leicester Square in London. In 1787 a print of it was published, claiming that it was the insignia of the Knights Templar. It was bought by the British Museum in 1909 (M&ME 1909,6-24,2).

The brooch discovered in 1830, the largest in the group illustrated, entered the museum in 1904 (M&ME 1904,1102.3). One terminal is missing, and the pin is 52 cm long. In 1989 two further incomplete thistle brooches and pieces from three bossed-type brooches were found, which are seen with the 1830 brooch in the group illustration above. The most complete of the 1989 group (illustrated above) has a runic futhark scratched on the reverse of the hoop. The other two have interlace around the bosses on the terminals.

It is thought likely that all these brooches were originally deposited together and have been dispersed and damaged by ploughing.
