= *Tîwaz (rune) =

Runic alphabet letter

Name	Proto-Germanic	Old English	Old Norse	
Name	*Tē₂waz	Tí/Tír	Týr	
Shape	Elder Futhark	Futhorc	Younger Futhark	
Unicode	ᛏ U+16CF		ᛏ U+16CF	ᛐ U+16D0
Transliteration	t			
Transcription	t		t, d	
IPA	[t]		[t], [d]	
Position in rune-row	17		12	

The t-rune ᛏ is named after Týr, and was identified with this god. The reconstructed Proto-Germanic name is *Tîwaz or *Teiwaz.

== Rune poems ==
Tiwaz is mentioned in all three rune poems. In the Icelandic and Norwegian poems, the rune is associated with the god Týr.

Language	Stanza	Translation	Comments
Old Norwegian	ᛏ Týr er æinendr ása; opt værðr smiðr blása.	Tyr is a one-handed god; often has the smith to blow.	"smiðr blása" means to blow on coals, making them hot for metal working
Old Icelandic	ᛏ Týr er einhendr áss ok ulfs leifar ok hofa hilmir Mars tiggi.	Tyr = god with one hand and leavings of the wolf and prince of temples.	"Mars tiggi" is a "more or less accurate [Latin gloss]".
Old English	ᛏ Tir biþ tacna sum, healdeð trẏƿa ƿel ƿiþ æþelingas; a biþ on færylde ofer nihta ġenipu, næfre sƿiceþ.	Tir beeth the sign which, holds the faiths well by princes; and beeth on faring over the mists of night, never failing.	"Fame, honour" is a gloss written alongside the rune. Several interpretations have been offered, typically involving association with the north star, as the words tacna and færyld have astronomical connotations (used for "sign of the zodiac" and "path of a planet", respectively).

== Usage ==
=== Ancient ===
==== Multiple Tiwaz runes ====
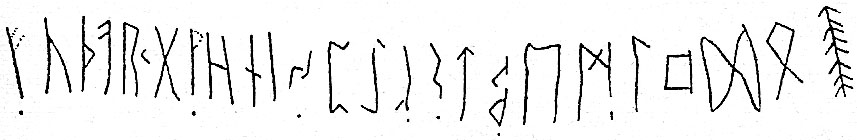
The inscription on the Kylver stone ends with stacked Tiwaz runes at the end of the line.

Multiple Tiwaz runes either stacked atop one another to resemble a tree-like shape, or repeated after one another, appear several times in Germanic paganism:

- The charm (alu) on the Lindholm amulet, dated from the 2nd to the 4th century, contains three consecutive t runes, which have been interpreted as an invocation of Týr.
- The Kylver Stone (400 AD, Gotland) features 8 stacked Tiwaz runes at the end of an Elder Futhark inscription.
- From 500 AD, a Scandinavian C-bracteate (Seeland-II-C) features an Elder Futhark inscription ending with three stacked Tiwaz runes.

==== Poetic Edda ====
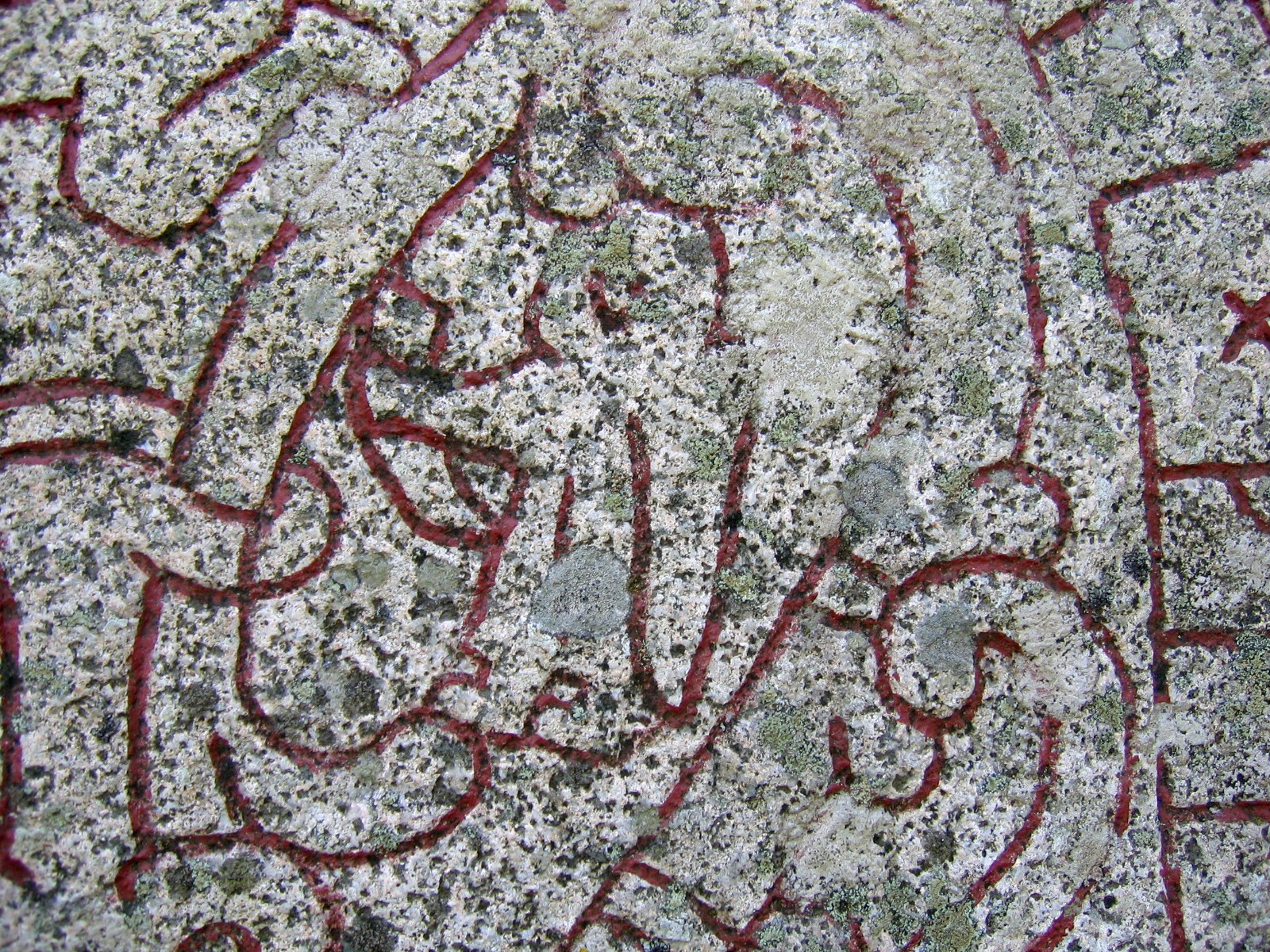
Sigrdrífa, Sigurd's teacher of runic lore, on the Drävle Runestone

According to the runologist Lars Magnar Enoksen, the Tiwaz rune is referred to in a stanza in Sigrdrífumál, a poem in the Poetic Edda.

Sigrdrífumál tells that Sigurd has slain the dragon Fafnir and arrives at a fortress of shields on top of a mountain which is lit by great fires. In the fortress, he finds an enchanted sleeping valkyrie whom he wakes by cutting open her corslet with his sword. The grateful valkyrie, Sigrdrífa, offers him the secrets of the runes in return for delivering her from the sleep, on condition that he shows that he has no fear. She begins by teaching him that if he wants to achieve victory in battle, he is to carve "victory runes" on his sword and twice say the name "Týr" - the name of the Tiwaz rune.

6. Sigrúnar skaltu kunna, ef þú vilt sigr hafa, ok rísta á hjalti hjörs, sumar á véttrimum, sumar á valböstum, ok nefna tysvar Tý.	6. Winning-runes learn, if thou longest to win, And the runes on thy sword-hilt write; Some on the furrow, and some on the flat, And twice shalt thou call on Tyr.

==== Name in Futhorc ====
Futhorc manuscripts give different names to the t-rune. Sangallensis 270 (9th century) and Vindobonensis 795 (9th century) call the rune "Ti", while Cotton MS Domitian A IX (10th century?) calls it "Tir", and the Byrhtferth's Manuscript (12th century) calls it "Tyr". Ti may be an uninflected form of the possessive "Tiwes" as found in "Tiwesdæg", which would make it the name of an English god. Similar spellings of this god's name (such as Tii) are attested to in Old English.

=== Modern ===
==== Germanic neopaganism ====
The Týr rune is commonly used by Germanic neopagans to symbolize veneration of the god Týr.

==== Usage in Nazism and Neo-Nazism ====
Divisional insignia of the 32nd SS Volunteer Grenadier Division

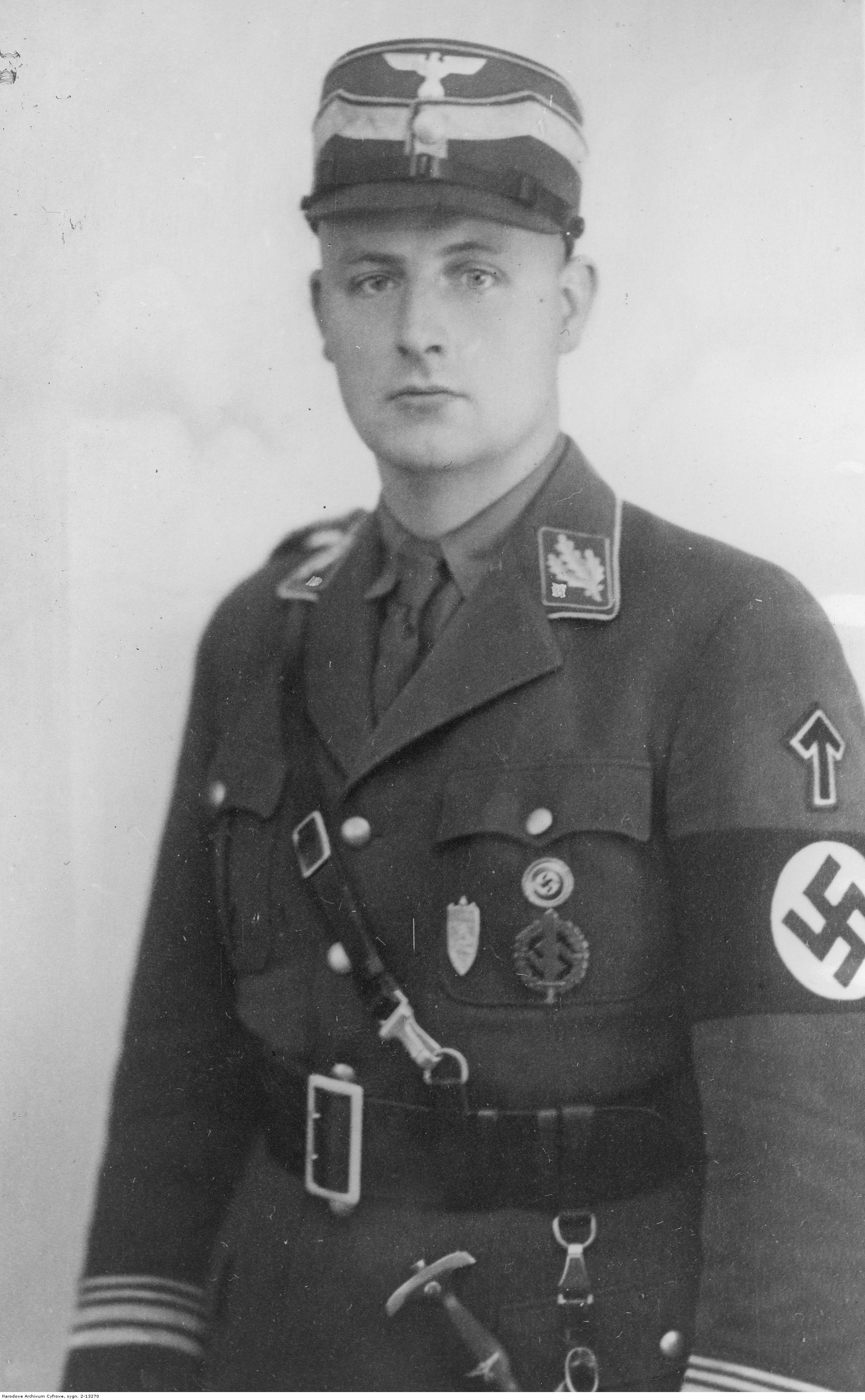
An SA-Obergruppenführer wearing a Týr rune on his left arm

The Týr rune in Guido von List's Armanen Futharkh was based on the version found in the Younger Futhark. List's runes were later adopted and modified by Karl Maria Wiligut, who was responsible for their adoption by the Nazis, and they were subsequently widely used on insignia and literature during the Third Reich. It was the badge of the Sturmabteilung training schools, the Reichsführerschulen in Nazi Germany. In World War II, it was adopted as the unit insignia of the 32nd SS Volunteer Grenadier Division "30 Januar".

Flag of the Free German Workers Party

Flag of the Nordic Resistance Movement

In Neo-Nazism it has appeared, together with the Sowilo rune, in the emblem of the Kassel-based think tank Thule Seminar. It has also appeared as the former logo of the fashion label Thor Steinar, which was banned in Germany over resemblance to SS officer uniforms, and the Scandinavia-based Nordic Resistance Movement which uses the symbol onto a diamond with stripes (in the same shape as the Hitlerjugend flag) in green, white, and black. (It might also be noted that both these uses were technically incorrect, since both Thor and Thule would be spelled with a thurisaz, ᚦ, rune.) The symbol was one of the numerous Nazi/neo-Nazi and fascist symbols/slogans used by the perpetrator of the Christchurch mosque shootings Brenton Harrison Tarrant alongside the Black Sun, the Othala/Odal rune, the Celtic Cross, the Kolovrat swastika, the Fourteen Words, and the Archangel Michael's Cross of the pro-Nazi Romanian organization Iron Guard.

==== Olympics ====
In 2018 the symbol was incorporated on the sweaters of the 2018 Norwegian Alpine ski team.

The sweaters were however quickly pulled from market, when the Nazi and far-right association raised controversy.

== Popular culture ==
- In the manga Vinland Saga, the character Thors has carved two Týr-runes into his dagger, likely in the same context as stated in Sigrdrífumál: to achieve victory in battle.
- In the science fiction anime series Mobile Suit Gundam: Iron-Blooded Orphans, Teiwaz is the name of a mafia-like faction representing the Outer Sphere and the largest conglomerate on Jupiter.
- In the video game God of War Ragnarök: Valhalla, Týr's weapons, even ones he acquired from other lands, all bear the Tiwaz rune.

== See also ==
- Broad arrow
- Planet symbols#Mars
