= List of rune-row inscriptions =

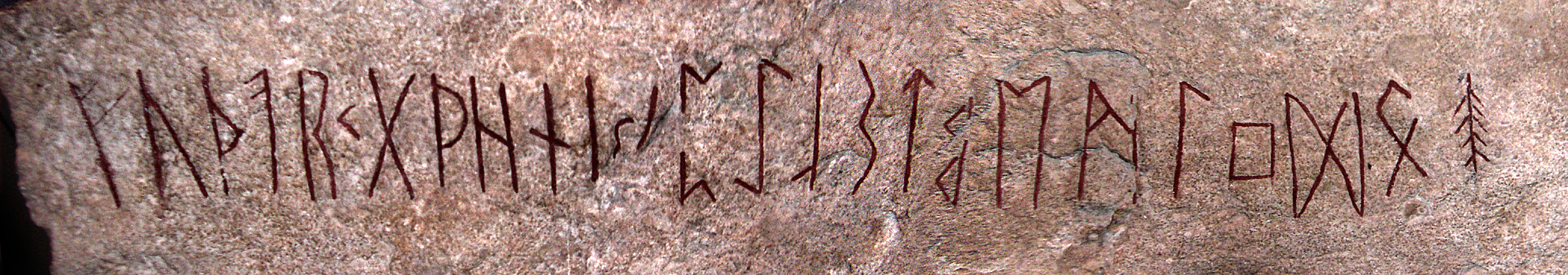
Elder fuþark rune-row the Kylver stone

The following is a list of rune-row inscriptions. These are runic inscriptions containing a sequence of runes in order. Based on the first six runes typically in the sequence, a rune-row may also be variously known as a fuþark (elder and younger fuþark), fuþorc (Anglo-Frisian) or fuþork (medieval).

Some inscriptions listed are complete, whereas others contains only short sections like fuþ, or are fragments of a larger sequences. Despite often being portrayed in a standardised manner, the orders and shapes of the runes in these sequences vary considerably.

== Elder fuþark ==
| Inscription | Date | Find location | Object | Runes | Transliteration | Comments |
|---|---|---|---|---|---|---|
| Hole Runestone | c. 50 BCE-275 CE | Norway | Stone | ᚠᚢᚦ | fuþ | The earliest datable runestone and possibly the earliest known runic inscription. It is unclear if there was a conception of a whole ordered rune-row at this time. |
| Kylver Stone | c. 375-470 | Gotland, Sweden | Stone | ᚠᚢᚦᚨᚱᚲᚷᚹᚺᚾᛁᛃᛈᛇᛉᛊᛏᛒᛖᛗᛚᛜᛞᛟ | fuþarkgwhnijpezstbemlŋdo | |
| Lindkær and Over hornbæk bracteates | c. 400-650 | Denmark | Gold bracteates | ᚠᚢᚦᚨᚱᚲᚷᚹᚺᚾᛖᛚᚨᛏᛒᛉᛋᚢᚨᛟ(?)ᚢ **ᚦ*ᚱᚲᚷᚹᚺᚾᛖᛚᚨᛏᛒᛉᛋᚢᛚᛟ(?)ᚢ (Note: Forms of some runes differ from this representation due to unicode limitations and the extensive variability and unconventional shapes used. More accurate transcriptions and images can be found in the references.) | fuþarkgwhn(ij)æptbzselo(?)d **þ*rkgwhn(ij)æptbzselo(?)d | Both come from the same original design with anticlockwise writing but have unusual rune shapes and row order, likely from copying errors. Due to the unconventional inscriptions, they are not always interpreted as rune rows. |
| IK 392 Gudme 2 bracteate | c. 400-650 | Fyn, Denmark | Gold bracteate | ᚠᚢᚦᚨᚱ | fuþar | The first rune has only one branch, resembling ᚴ, despite often being interpreted as f. The same design is seen in two other bracteates from Gudme. |
| IK153,1 bracteate | c. 400-650 | Skåne, Sweden | Gold bracteate | ᚠᚢᚦᚱ | fuþr | |
| Vadstena and Mariedamm bracteates | c. 450-600 | Östergötland and Närke, Sweden, respectively | Gold bracteates | ᚠᚢᚦᚨᚱᚲᚷᚹ : ᚺᚾᛁᛃᛈᛇᛉᛋ : ᛏᛒᛖᛗᛚᛜᛟᛞ | fuþarkgw : hnijïpzs : tbemlŋod | Both bracteates were made from the same stamp and their text is anti-clockwise, with the runes also facing this direction. |
| Breza pillar | c. 500 | Bosnia | Marl column | ᚠᚢᚦᚨᚱ^ᚷᚹᚻᚾᛁᛃᛇᛈᛉᛋᛏᛖᛗᛚ (Note: The p, for example is actually the form with a vertical line on both sides, not just the left. It is presented as it is here due to unicode limitations.) | fuþarkqwhnijïpzsteml | The four missing runes from the row were likely on a fragment that broke off |
| Grumpan bracteate | c. 500-600 | Västergötland, Sweden | Gold bracteate | ᚠᚢᚦᚨᚱᚲᚷᚹ········ᚺᚾᛁᛃᛈ--····ᛏᛒᛖᛗᛚᛜᛟᛞ···· | fuþarkgw········ hnijï(p)--····tbeml(ŋ)(o)d······ | The ŋ has alternatively been interpreted as a bind rune with i. |
| Aquincum brooch | c. 535-560 | Brooch | Budapest, Hungary | ᚠᚢᚦᚨᚱᚲᚷᚹ | fuþarkgw | |
| Charnay Fibula | c. 550-600 | Burgundy, France | Silver fibula | ᚠᚢᚦᚨᚱᚲᚷᚹᚻᚾᛁᛃᛇᛈᛇᛈᛉᛋᛏᛒᛖᛗ (Note: Forms of some runes differ from this representation due to unicode limitations. the p, for example is actually the form with a vertical line on both sides, not just the left. The j resembles a mirror image of ᛋ.) | fuþarkgwhnijïpzstbem | |
| Beuchte brooch | c. 550 | Niedersachsen, Germany | Silver-gilt brooch | ᚠᚢᚦᚨᚱᛉᛃ | fuþarzj | |
| Lány rune bone | c. 600 | Břeclav, Czech Republic | Bone fragment | (ᛏ)ᛒᛖᛗᛞᛟ | (t)bemdo (Note: ᛏ (t) identification is uncertain due to damage to the find.) | This is the only known South-Germanic inscription with the end of the older fuþark rune row and the only found in a Slavic cultural context. |

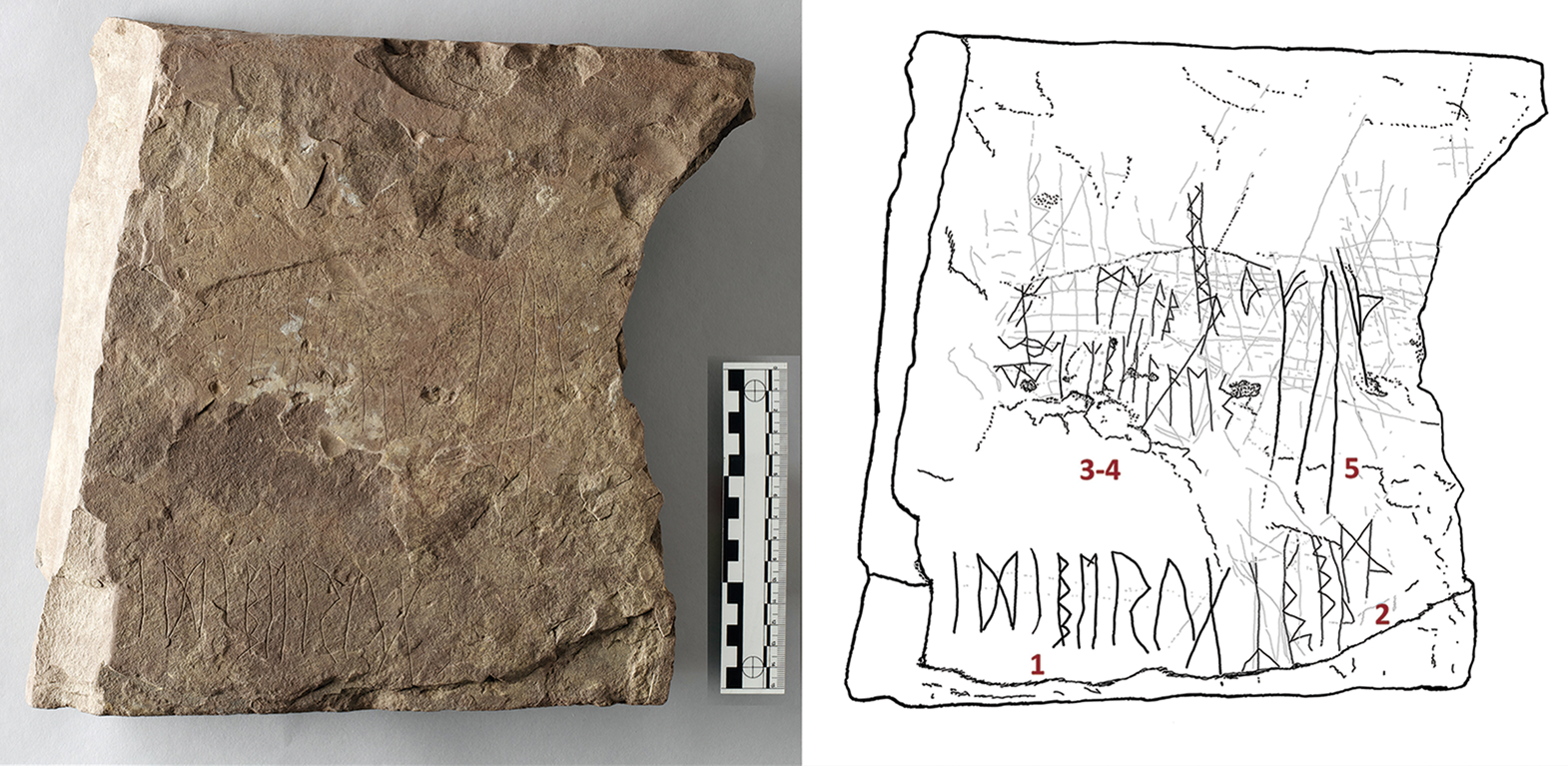
fuþ (5) on the Hole Runestone

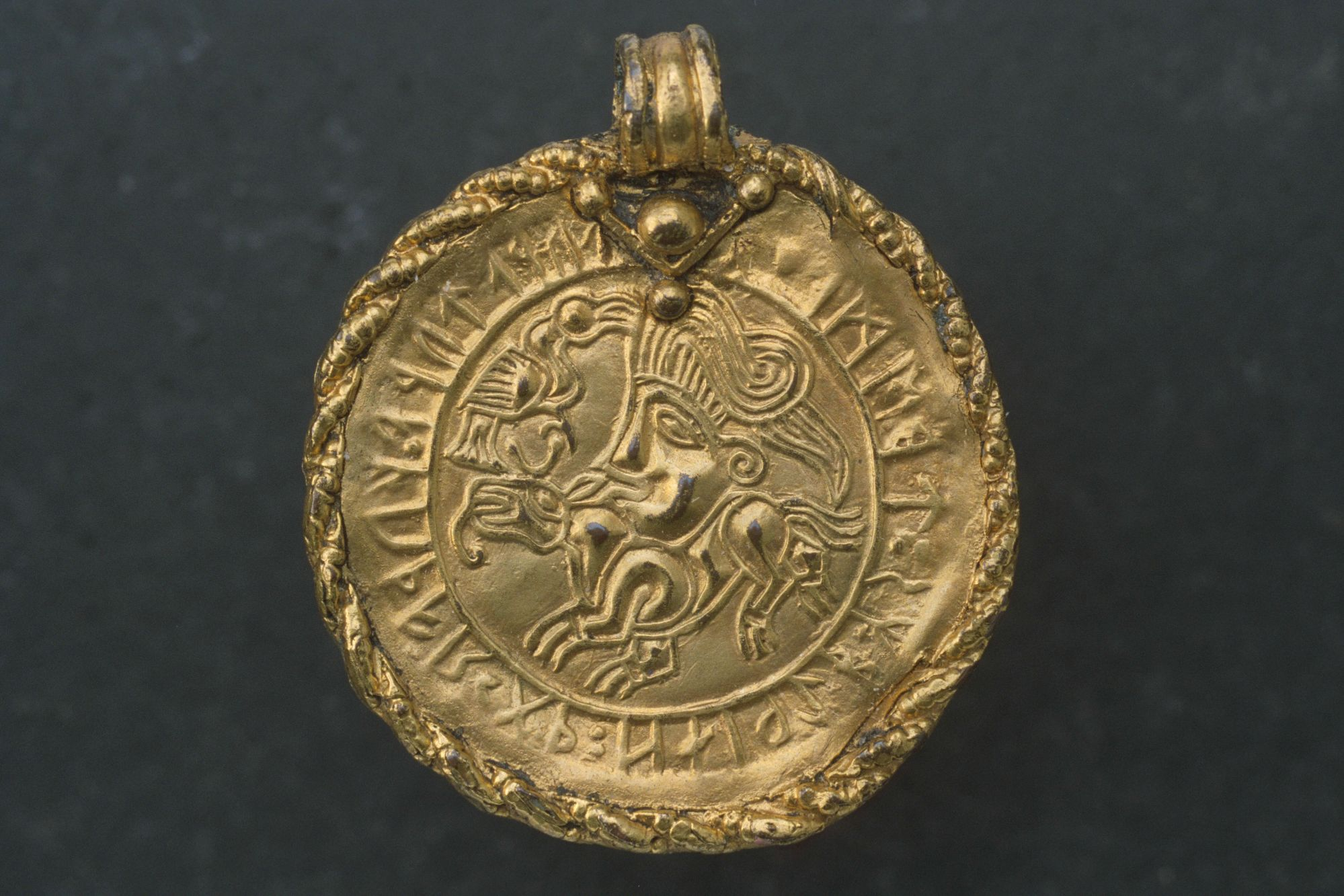
Anticlockwise rune-row on a Vadstena bracteate copy

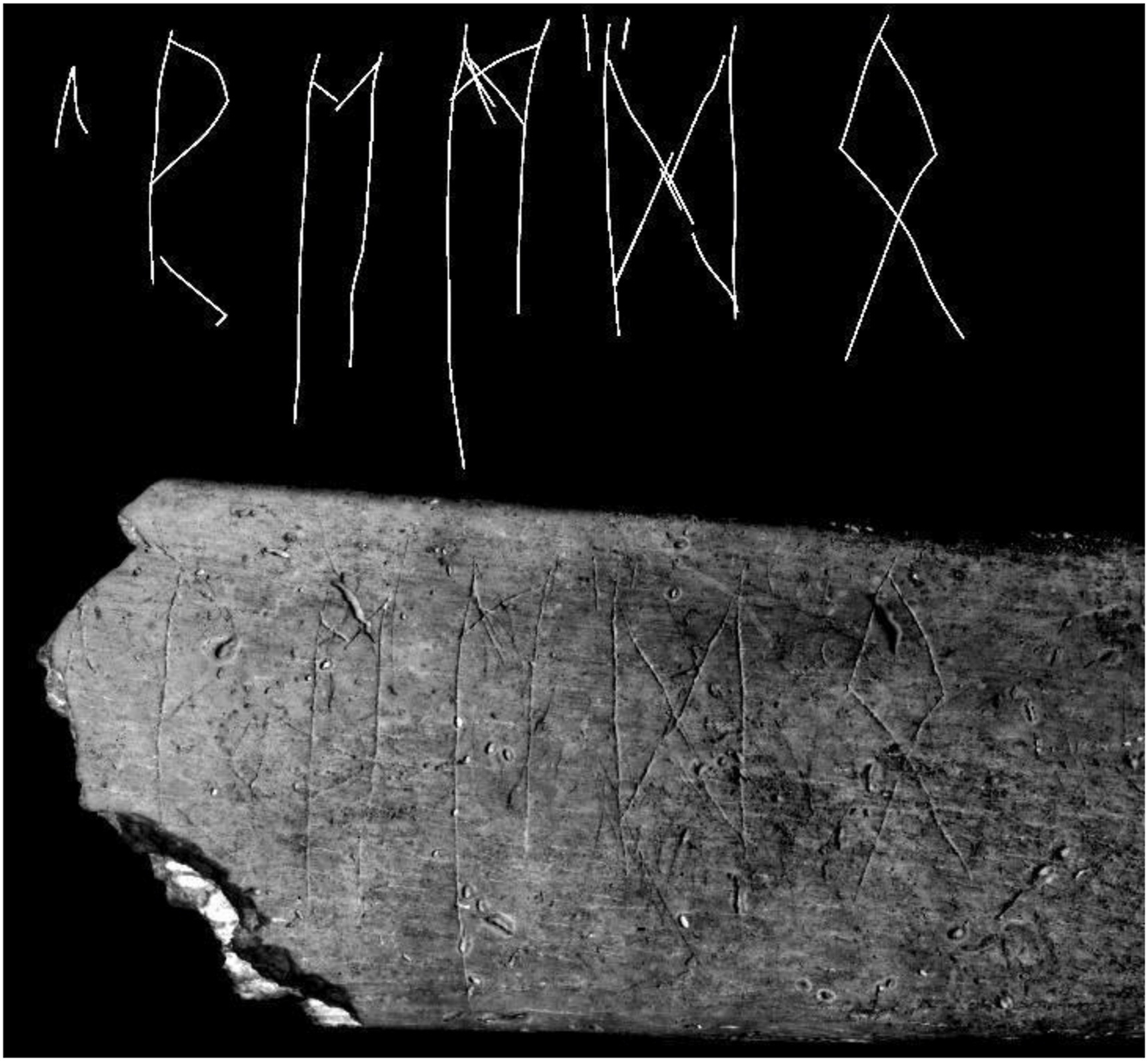
End of rune-row on the Lány rune bone

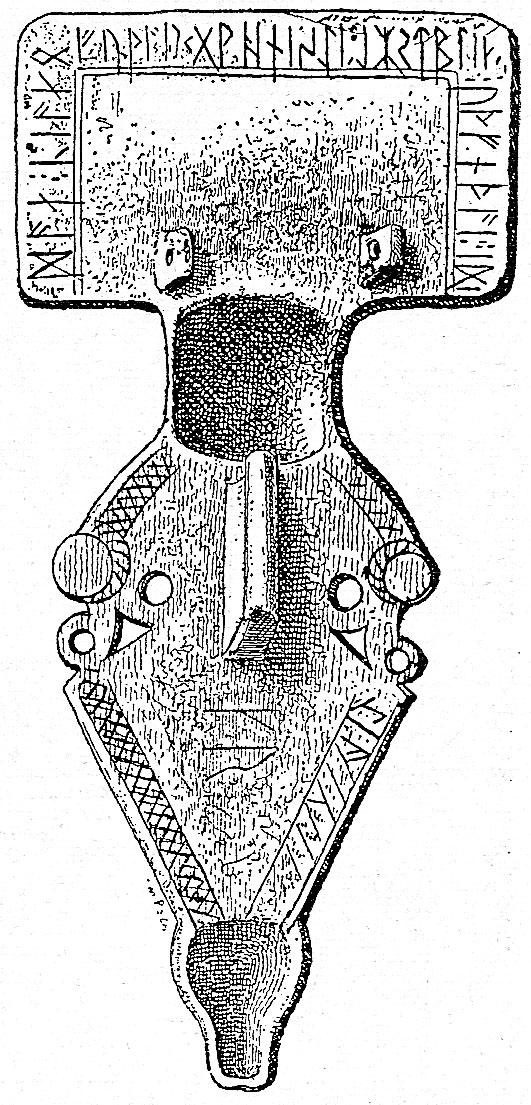
Drawing of the Charnay Fibula rune-row

== English fuþorc ==
| Inscription | Date | Location | Object | Runes | Transliteration | Comments |
|---|---|---|---|---|---|---|
| Malton pin | c. 8th century | Yorkshire, England | Pin | ᚠᚢᚦᚩᚱᚳᚷᛚᚪᚫᛖ | fuþorcglaæe | |
| Brandon pin | c. 8th century | Norfolk, England | Pin | ᚠᚢᚦᚩᚱᚳᛡᚹᚻᚾᛁᛄᛇᛈᛉᚴ | fuþorcgwhnijïps | |
| Seax of Beagnoth | c. 10th century | London, England | Seax | ᚠᚢᚦᚩᚱᚳᚷᚹᚻᚾᛁᛄᛇᛈᛉᛋᛏᛒᛖᛝᛞᛚᛗᛟᚪᚫᚣᛠ | fuþorcgwhnijïpxstbeŋdlmœaæy ea | The order and form of the runestaves may suggest the inscription was based off a manuscript fuþorc. |

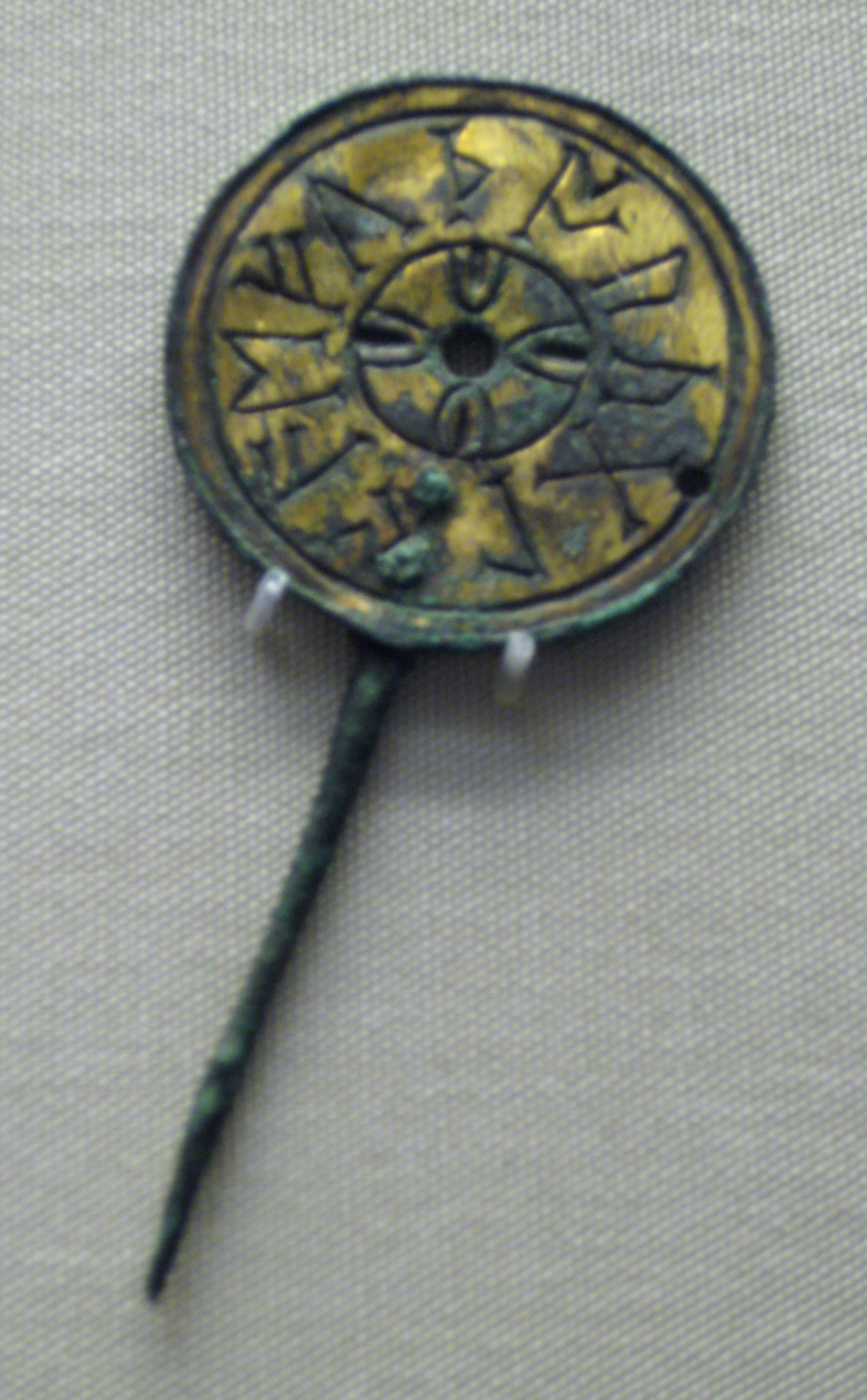
Malton pin

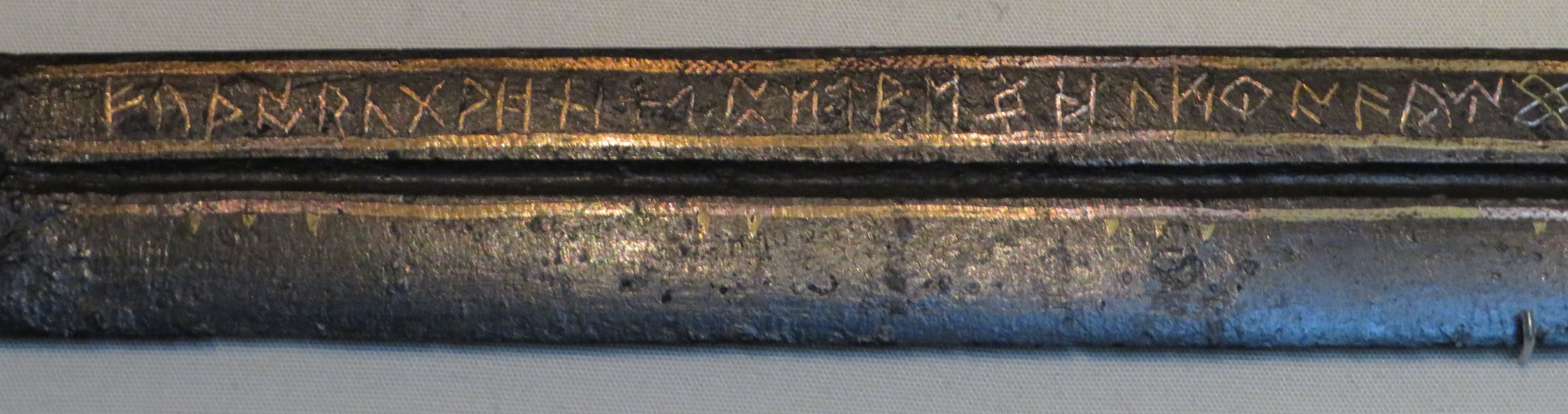
Seax of Beagnoth rune-row

== Younger fuþark ==
| Inscription | Date | Location | Object | Runes | Transliteration | Comments |
|---|---|---|---|---|---|---|
| Penrith brooch | c. 10th century | Cumberland, England | Silver brooch | | fuþorkhniastbmm | This inscription uses short-twig runes. |

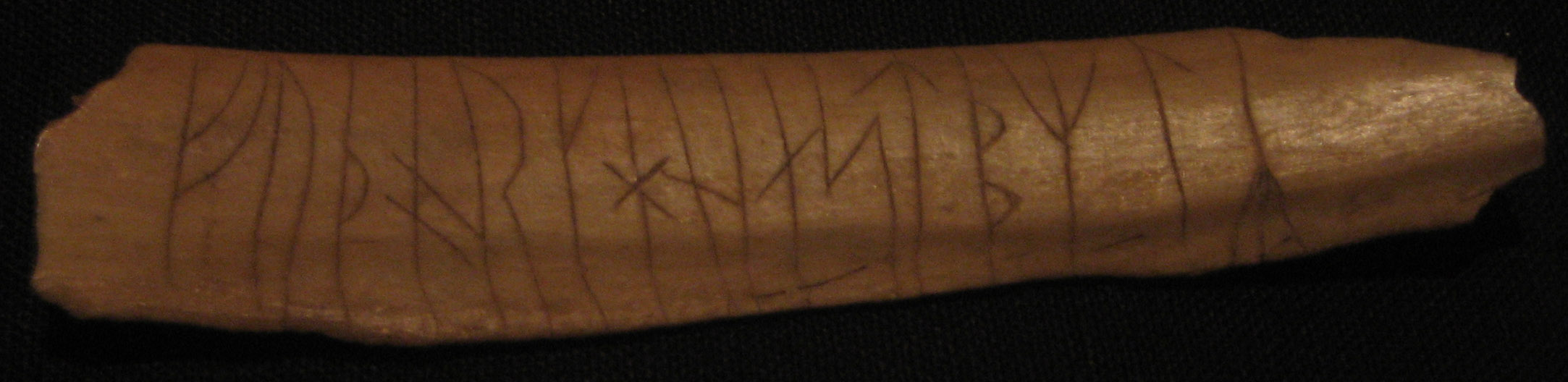
Inscription on bone, Sweden

== Medieval fuþork ==
At least 70 partial or complete medieval rune-rows are known from the Bryggen inscriptions. These include:

| Inscription | Date | Location | Object | Runes | Transliteration | Comments |
|---|---|---|---|---|---|---|
| N B17 | c. 12th-16th century | Bergen, Norway | Small stick | ᚠᚢᚦᚮᚱᚴᚼᚿᛁᛆᛌᛐᛒᛘᛚᛦ | fuþorkhniastbmly | |
| N B521 | c. 12th-16th century | Bergen, Norway | Small stick | | fuþ | |
| N B592 | c. 12th-16th century | Bergen, Norway | Small stick | | fuþorkhniastbmlyfuþorkhnia f fuþobkhniarmlyfuþorkhnisabmly | |

Other examples include:

| Inscription | Date | Location | Object | Runes | Transliteration | Comments |
|---|---|---|---|---|---|---|
| Vr 4 | c. 1200-1233 | Värmland, Sweden | Sandstone font | | fuþorkhniastblmʀ fuþ | |

== Function ==
Rune-rows may have been tools for teaching and learning writing. This likely is the case with the Kylver stone, which has no commemorative function. Similarly, the Hole runestone has scribbled markings throughout the stone that may reflect use as a writing tablet. It has been suggested that it originates from an early period in which writing in runes was an emergent skill that carvers were learning to master. The sequences may also have been intended to have a magical or protective function, particularly in the case of bracteates, where they would have been worn and often have texts that suggest an illiterate maker copying designs.

== See also ==
- Abecedarium, lists of letters in alphabets

== Bibliography ==
=== Databases ===
- "RuneS: Aquincum brooch". www.runesdb.de.
- "British Museum, pin". The British Museum.
- "British Museum, seax". The British Museum.
- "Die Goldbrakteaten der Völkerwanderungszeit. 1,3, ikonographischer katalog: lindkær". www.digitale-sammlungen.de.
- "Die Goldbrakteaten der Völkerwanderungszeit. 1,3, ikonographischer katalog: DR BR22". www.digitale-sammlungen.de.
- "Die Goldbrakteaten der Völkerwanderungszeit. 1,3, ikonographischer katalog: IK 153,1". www.digitale-sammlungen.de.
- "Runor, N B17". runor.raa.se.
- "Runor, N B521". runor.raa.se.
- "Runor, N B592". runor.raa.se.
- "Runor, DR BR22". runor.raa.se.
- "Runor, Grumpan". runor.raa.se.
- "Runor, Gudme". runor.raa.se.
- "Runor, IK 153,1". runor.raa.se.
- "Runor, Kylver". runor.raa.se.
- "Runor, Lindkær". runor.raa.se.
- "Runor, Mariedamm". runor.raa.se.
- "Runor, Penrith". runor.raa.se.
- "Runor, Vadstena". runor.raa.se.
- "Runor, Vr 4". runor.raa.se.
- "Nasjonalbiblioteket, N B17". www.nb.no. Archived from the original on 2 December 2006.

=== Secondary ===
- Antonsen, Elmer H. (2002). Runes and Germanic Linguistics. Walter de Gruyter. ISBN 978-3-11-017462-5.
- Barnes, Michael P. (2022). Runes: a handbook (paperback ed.). Woodbridge Rochester, NY: the Boydell press. ISBN 9781783276974.
- Biørnstad, Lasse (5 February 2025). "Researchers found more pieces of the world's oldest runestone – may change the history of runes". Science Norway.
- Findell, Martin (1 October 2012). Phonological Evidence from the Continental Runic Inscriptions. Walter de Gruyter. ISBN 978-3-11-028925-1.
- Looijenga, Jantina Helena (1997). Runes around the North Sea and on the Continent AD 150-700; texts & contexts (PDF) (Thesis). University of Groningen.
- Looijenga, Tineke (1999). "Who wrote the Breza futhark, and why?". Grippe, Kamm und Eulenspiegel Festschrift fur Elmar Seebold zum 65. Geburtstag. Berlin: De Gruyter.
- Looijenga, Tineke (1 January 2003). Texts and Contexts of the Oldest Runic Inscriptions. BRILL. ISBN 978-90-04-12396-0.
- Macháček, Jiří; Nedoma, Robert; Dresler, Petr; Schulz, Ilektra; Lagonik, Elias; Johnson, Stephen M.; Kaňáková, Ludmila; Slámová, Alena; Llamas, Bastien; Wegmann, Daniel; Hofmanová, Zuzana (1 March 2021). "Runes from Lány (Czech Republic) - The oldest inscription among Slavs. A new standard for multidisciplinary analysis of runic bones". Journal of Archaeological Science. 127 (105333). doi:10.1016/j.jas.2021.105333. hdl:2440/130660. ISSN 0305-4403.
- MacLeod, Mindy; Mees, Bernard (2006). Runic Amulets and Magic Objects. Boydell Press. pp. 41–44. ISBN 1-84383-205-4.
- Page, R. I. (2006). "Rune Rows: Epigraphical and Manuscript". Das fuÞark und seine einzelsprachlichen Weiterentwicklungen: Akten der Tagung in Eichstätt vom 20. bis 24. Juli 2003. Walter de Gruyter. ISBN 978-3-11-019008-3.
- Solheim, Steinar; Zilmer, Kristel; Zawalska, Judyta; Vasshus, Krister Sande Kristoffersen; Sand-Eriksen, Anette; Kimball, Justin J.L.; Havstein, John Asbjørn Munch (2025). "Inscribed Sandstone Fragments of Hole, Norway: Radiocarbon Dates Provide Insight into Rune-Stone Traditions". Antiquity: 1–18. doi:10.15184/aqy.2024.225.
- Wicker, Nancy L.; Williams, Henrik (2012). "Bracteates and Runes". Futhark : International Journal of Runic Studies. 3: 151–214.
- Zilmer, K.; Vasshus, K.S.K. (2023). "Runic fragments from the Svingerud grave field in Norway: earliest datable evidence of runic writing on stone". NOWELE: North-Western European Language Evolution. 76: 233–303. doi:10.1075/nowele.00080.zil.
- "11. B/BRM-numbers with complete or partly extant fuþork inscriptions". www.nb.no. Archived from the original on 2004-12-05.
