= Seeland-II-C =

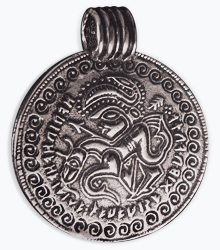
Modern copy

Seeland-II-C (Sjælland bracteate 2) is a Scandinavian bracteate from Zealand, Denmark, that has been dated to the Migration period (around 500 AD). The bracteate bears an Elder Futhark inscription which reads as:

ᚺᚨᚱᛁᚢᚺᚨ ᚺᚨᛁᛏᛁᚲᚨ ᛬ ᚠᚨᚱᚨᚢᛁᛋᚨ ᛬ ᚷᛁᛒᚢ ᚨᚢᛅᚨ ᛬ ᛏᛏᛏ
hariuha haitika : farauisa : gibu auja : ttt

The final ttt is a triple-stacked Tiwaz rune. This use of the rune is often interpreted as three invocations of the Norse pagan god Tyr.

The central image shows a male's head above a quadruped. This is the defining characteristic of C-bracteates (of which some 400 specimens survive), and is often interpreted as a depiction of the god Odin, healing his horse.

Wolfgang Krause translates the inscription as: "Hariuha I am called: the dangerous knowledgeable one: I give chance." farauisa is interpreted as fara-uisa, either "danger-wise" or "travel-wise". Erik Moltke translates this word as "one who is wise about dangers". The giving of "chance" or "luck" in the inscription is evidence of the use of bracteates as amulets.

The inscription *hariuha is suggested to contain the Germanic noun *harja, meaning "army, troop" - a common occurrence in Germanic compound names.

== See also ==
- Merseburg Incantations
- Vadstena bracteate
