= Hogganvik runestone =

Coordinates: 58°2′15.187″N 7°21′53.856″E

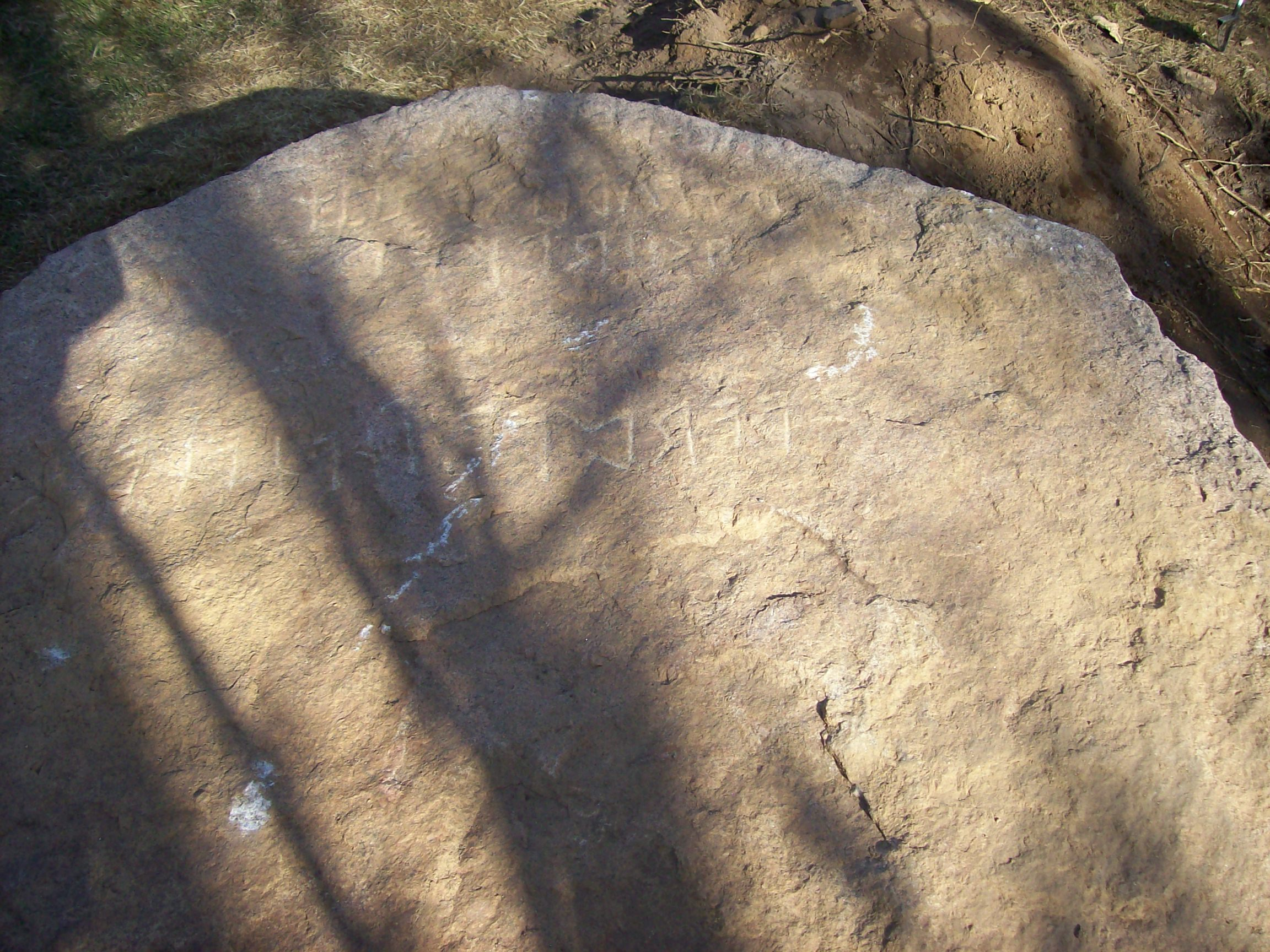
Hogganvik runestone in May 2010

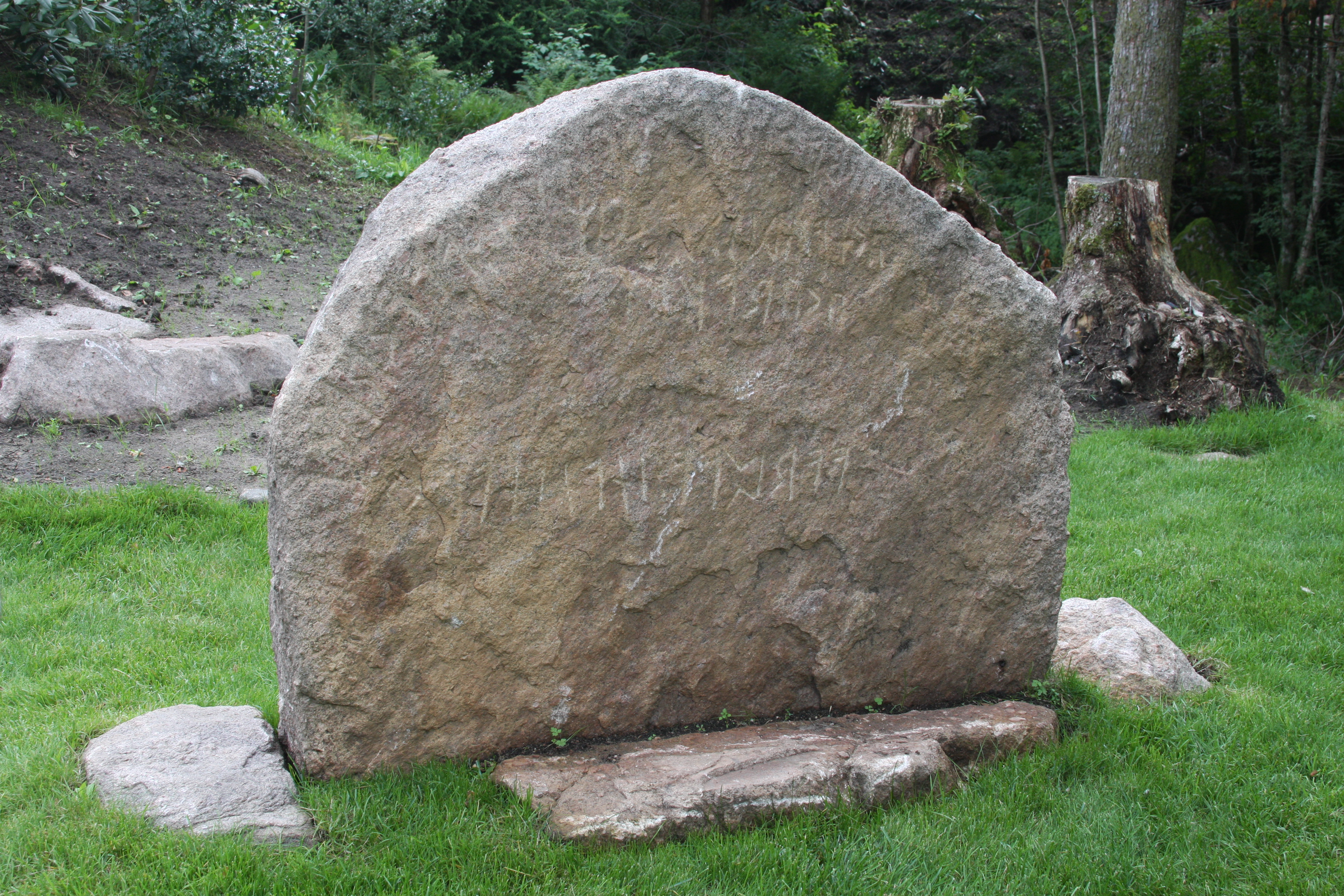
The stone re-established at its original location, August 2010

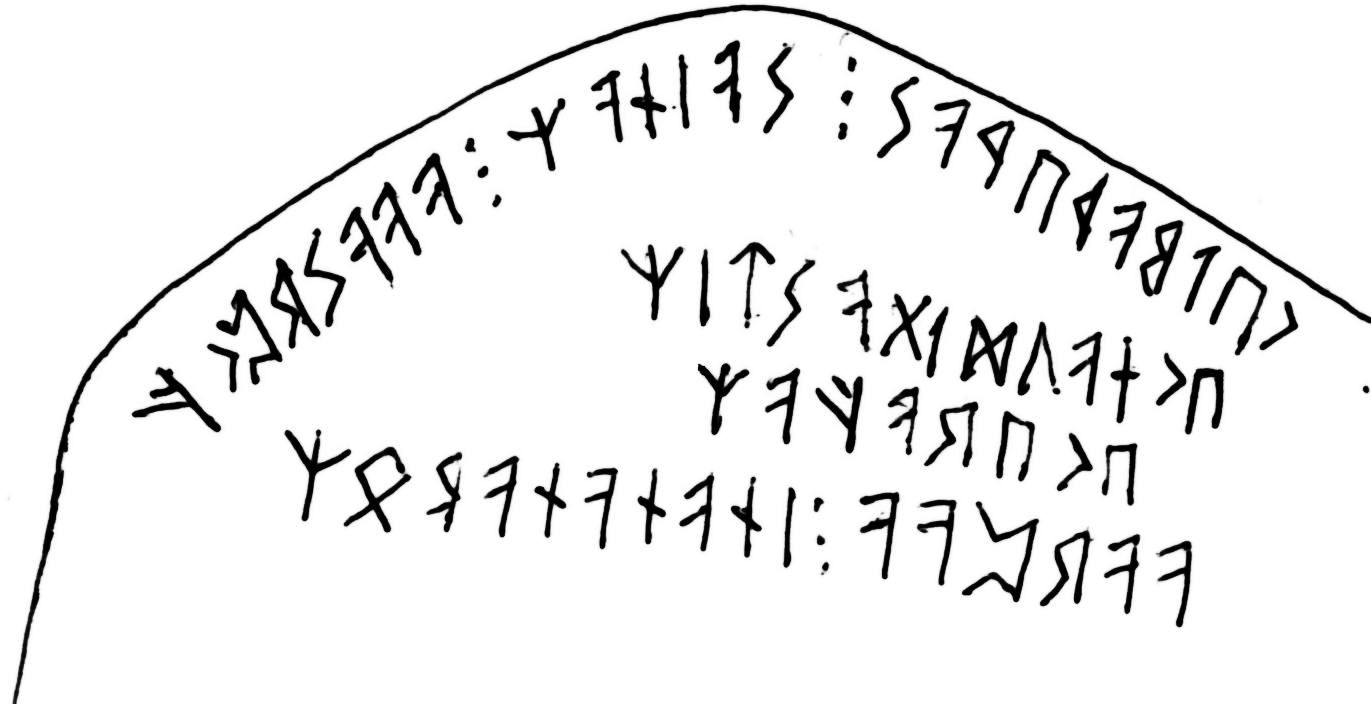
Inscription

The Hogganvik runestone is a fifth-century runestone, bearing an Elder Futhark inscription, that was discovered in September 2009 by Arnfinn Henriksen, a resident of Hogganvik, in the Sånum-Lundevik area of Mandal, Vest-Agder, Norway, while working in the garden.

== Description ==
The Hogganvik runestone is a stone slab of about 1.5 square metres (16 sq ft), weighing approximately 800 kilograms (1,800 lb). It was lying face down and the runic inscription is therefore well preserved. The inscription, which is in Proto-Norse, can be approximately dated to between 350 and 500 CE and consists of 62 characters, one a bind-rune. This is an exceptionally long text for the early period, either the second longest after that of the Tune stone (known since 1627), or possibly the third; the inscription on the Rö stone has missing and illegible runes.

A report was issued in October 2009 by runologist James E. Knirk, and provides a transliteration of the inscription.

== Text ==
[ᛊ]ᚲᛖᛚᛒᚨᚦᛖᚹᚨᛊ ᛬ ᛊ[ᛏ]ᚨᛁᚾᚨᛉ ᛬ ᚨᚨᚨᛊᚱᛈᚲᚠ
[s]kelbaþewas : s[t]ainaz : aaasrpkf
Skelba-þewaz’s ["Shaking-servant’s" (personal name)] stone [=(grave) monument] aaasrpkf (a sequence of letters used as an incantation).

ᛖᚲᚾᚨᚢᛞᛁᚷᚨᛊᛏᛁᛉ
eknaudigastiz
I [=the rune carver] [am called] Naudigastiz [="Need-guest" (personal name)]; (name of the Runecarver)

ᛖᚲᛖᚱᚨᚠᚨᛉ
ekerafaz
I, [nicknamed] the Wolverine.

ᚨᚨᚱᛈᚨᚨ ᛬ ᛁᚾᚨᚾᚨᚾᚨᛚᛟᛉ / ᚾᚨᛒᛟᛉ / ᚾᚨᚹᛟᛉ
aarpaa : inananaloz / naboz / nawoz
aarpaa (a sequence of letters used as an incantation) ?Within/From within the ?wheel-nave/?cabin-corner [or: ?needle]. (Place)

The stone is a memorial. The meaningless sequences, with the repeated a runes, may be alphabet magic. The fourth line is hard to interpret. The middle two lines name the carver of the runes.

== Archaeological investigation ==
In May 2010 an archaeological investigation was carried out. The face of the stone with the inscription was shown to be more weathered than the underside, indicating it had been raised over a grave, and a large Iron Age burial was found under the site, but was not excavated.

== See also ==
- List of runestones
