= Vadstena bracteate =

Circa 500 CE artifact found in Sweden

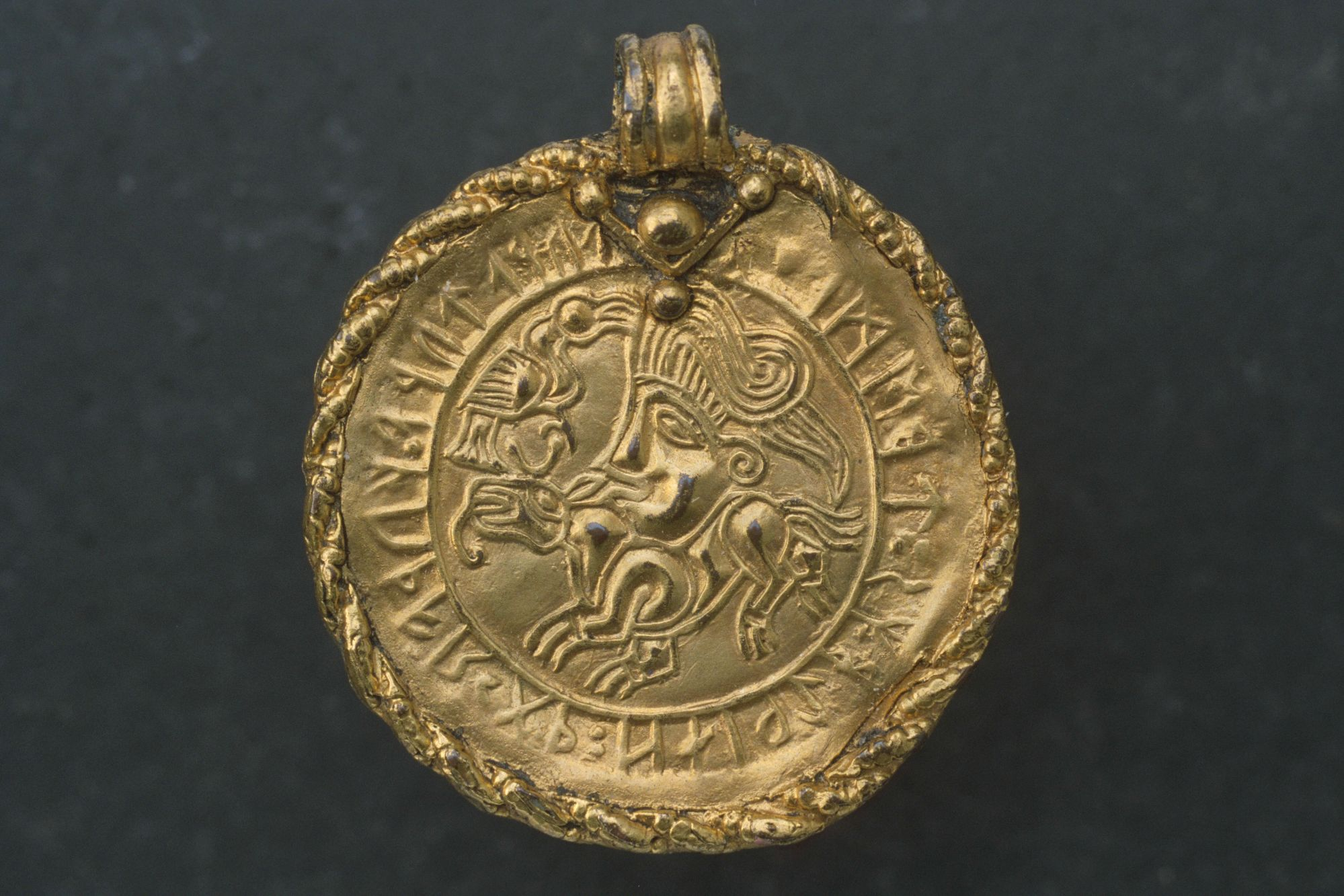
Copy of the stolen bracteate from Vadstena, Östergötland, Sweden.

The Vadstena bracteate (Rundata Ög 178, IK 377.1) is a gold C-bracteate found in the ground at Vadstena, Sweden, in 1774. Along with the bracteate was a gold ring and a piece of gold sheet: all were nearly melted down by a goldsmith who was stopped by a local clergyman. The bracteate was stolen in 1938 from the Swedish Museum of National Antiquities and has not yet been found. It is notable for its inscription, which includes a full list of elder futhark runes.

== Description ==
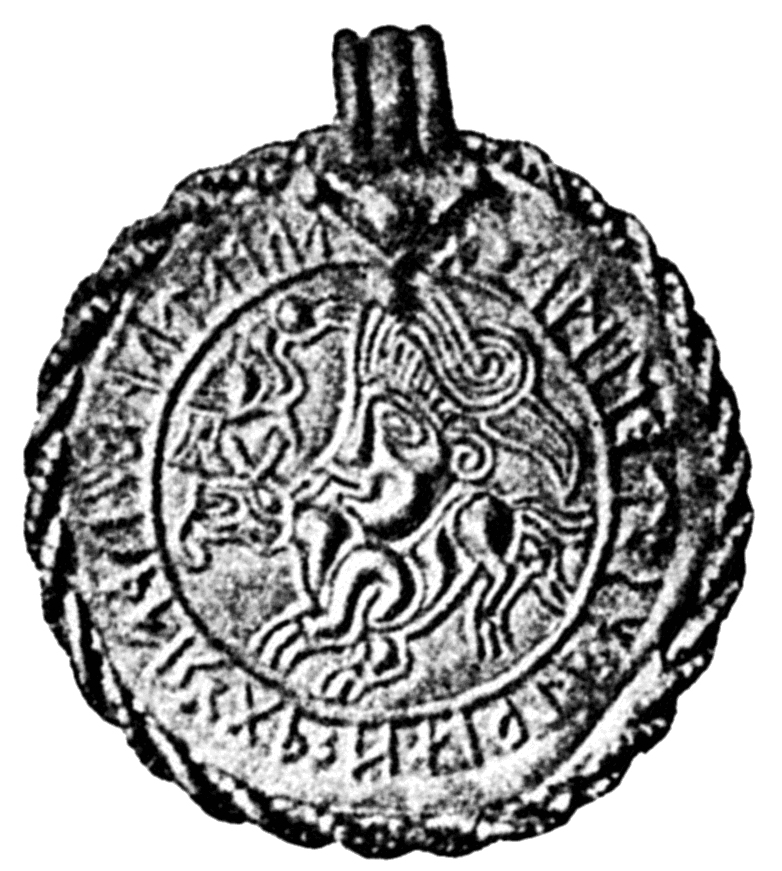
The Vadstena bracteate. Older picture from Nordisk familjebok.

The bracteate is believed to have been made about AD 500. In the middle of the bracteate is a four-legged animal with a man's head above it, and in front of this a bird separated from the other images by a line. This image is commonly associated with the Norse god Odin in bracteate iconography.

=== Inscription ===
The bracteate is most famous for containing a full listing of the Elder Futhark runes. The runes in the futhark are divided by dots into three groups of eight runes which are commonly called ættir. The entire inscription reads:

tuwatuwa; fuþarkgw; hnijïpzs; tbemlŋo[d]

The last rune (d) is hidden below the necklace holder piece that has been molded on top of the bracteate, but archaeologists know what it is because it is visible in a bracteate struck using the same die and found nearby in 1906, the Mariedamm bracteate, Nä 10, IK 377.2, which reads:

(t)uwatuwa; fuþarkgw; hnijïpzs; tbemlŋod.

The first part of the inscription, tuwatuwa, is not yet understood but is assumed to be associated with magic; however, this is a stock explanation for runic text that has not yet been interpreted.

== See also ==
- Kylver Stone
- Runic magic
- Sjælland bracteate 2
