= Rö runestone =

Coordinates: 58.6669°N 11.2489°E

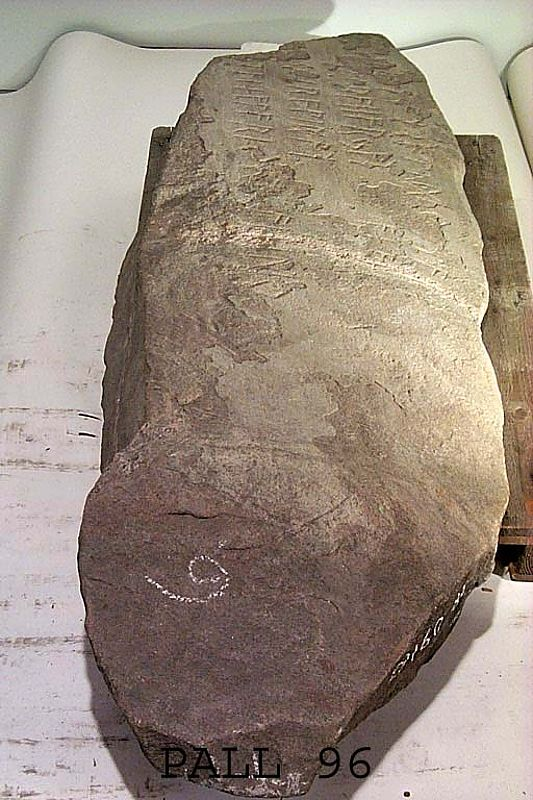
Rö runestone, photographed in 2000

The Rö runestone, designated under Rundata as Bo KJ73 U, is one of Sweden's oldest and most notable runestones.

== Description ==
The Rö runestone was discovered in 1919 at the farm Rö on the island of Otterö, north of the fishing village Grebbestad in Bohuslän. At that time, it was erected near the location where it was found, but currently resides in the Swedish History Museum in Stockholm.

The stone is made of granite and it is 2 metres tall and more than 1.2 metres wide. The inscription was made on a flat surface, unfortunately damaged due to flaking, and runs in four parallel rows from top to bottom. Using the elder futhark, the runes are composed in Proto-Norse exhibiting preserved declensions and intermediate vowels that would ultimately be lost when the language transitioned into Old Norse. The form of the runes suggests that the inscription dates from the early 5th century and is consequently the longest inscription from a period earlier than the 7th century.

Because the location where this runestone stood is adjacent to an ancient sailing route, it is possible that the inscription was made by visitors and not by locals.

The name Stainawarijaz in the text means "Stone Guard" or "Keeper of Stones". In addition, the word fahido, often translated as "carved" or "inscribed", actually means "painted". Many runestones had their inscriptions painted, although there is no direct evidence that the Rö runestone was painted other than the use of this word.

== Inscription ==
=== Transcription of the runes ===
ek hra(z)az/hra(þ)az satido -tain ¶ ana----(r) ¶ swabaharjaz ¶ s-irawidaz ¶ ... stainawarijaz fahido

=== Transliteration ===
Ek Hrazaz/Hraþaz satido [s]tain[a] ... Swabaharjaz s[a]irawidaz. ... Stainawarijaz fahido.

=== Translation ===
I, Hrazaz/Hraþaz raised the stone ... Suebian warrior with wide wounds. ... Stainawarijaz carved.

== See also ==
- List of runestones
- Hogganvik runestone
