= Kylver Stone =

5th-century runestone in Sweden

Coordinates: 57.2855°N 18.4401°E

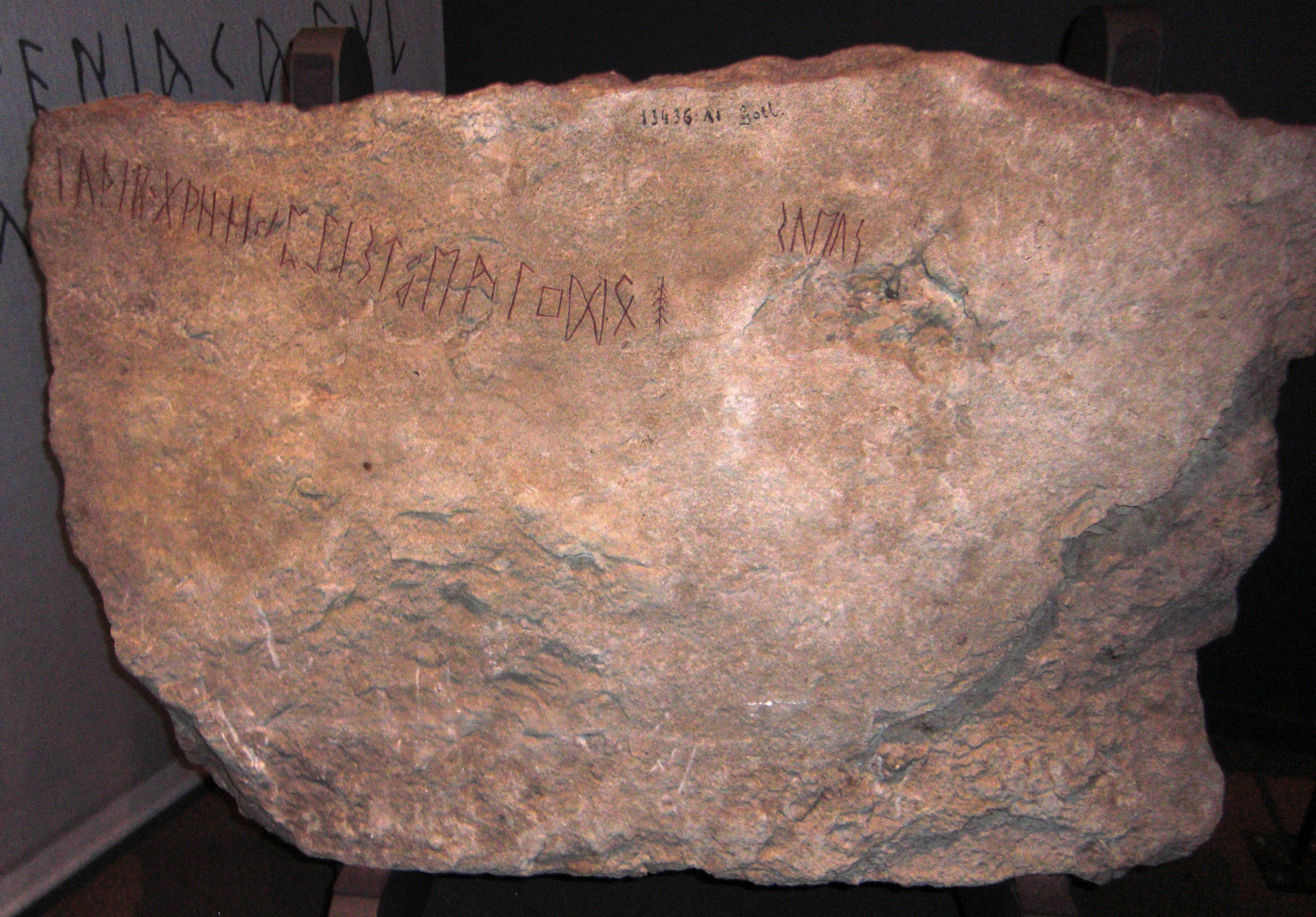
The Kylver stone

The Kylver stone, listed in the Rundata catalog as runic inscription G 88, is a Swedish runestone which dates from about 400 AD. It is notable for its listing of each of the runes in the Elder Futhark.

== Description ==
The Kylver stone was found during the excavation of a cemetery near a farm at Kylver, Stånga, Gotland, in 1903. The stone was a flat limestone rock used to seal a grave and the runic inscription was written on the underside, and could therefore not be read from above. The dating of the stone from 400 AD is based upon the archeological dating of the graves.

The Kylver stone was removed from Gotland and brought to the Swedish Museum of National Antiquities in Stockholm where it remains on display as of 2022.

The fact that the inscription was on the inside of a cover to a grave has resulted in speculation that it represented a use of the Elder Futhark to pacify the dead man in some manner. However, it has been pointed out that there is nothing in the inscription to support this. In addition, there is no evidence that the inscription was made for the purpose of being used on the cover of a grave. There are many examples where stone with runic inscriptions was reused for other purposes. It has been suggested that the likely purpose of making the inscription was for practice or instruction in the carving of the Elder Futhark.

== Inscription ==
The Kylver stone is inscribed with the earliest known sequential listing of the 24 runes of the Elder Futhark,

…ᚢ ᚦ ᚨ ᚱ ᚲ ᚷ … ᚺ ᚾ ᛁ ᛃ ᛈ ᛇ ᛉ ᛊ ᛏ ᛒ ᛖ ᛗ ᛚ ᛜ ᛞ ᛟ
[f]u þ a r k g [w] h n i j p ï z s t b e m l ŋ d o

with the a (ᚨ), s (ᛊ), and b runes (ᛒ) mirrored compared to later use, and the z rune (ᛉ) upside down (ᛦ). The dots in the image indicate incorrect or unorthodox forms like these in the original inscription. The f (ᚠ) and w runes (ᚹ) runes are only partially inscribed.

After the last rune follows a spruce- or tree-like rune, with six twigs to the left and eight to the right of a single stave. This is interpreted as a bindrune of stacked Tiwaz rune, or possibly of six Tiwaz and four Ansuz runes to invoke Tyr and the Æsir for protection.

At a separate space the word ᛊᚢᛖᚢᛊ sueus is inscribed. The meaning of this latter palindromic word is unknown, but it is possible that it is associated with magic. One suggestion presented by Marstrander is that it is a magical writing of the word 'eus' (the nominative form of the word horse) starting from the e and writing either way. However, this suggestion has been criticized as being "linguistically impossible" for that time period. The small inscription also uses the Younger Futhark version of the s-rune. It is also possible that it refers to the Germanic tribe of the Suiones that inhabited the region, whose realm laid the basis for what became Sweden.

== See also ==
- List of runestones
- Rundata
- Runic magic
- Vadstena bracteate – Another Elder Futhark inscription.
