= List of languages by first written account =

This is a list of languages arranged by age of the oldest existing text recording a complete sentence in the language.

It does not include undeciphered writing systems. It also does not include inscriptions consisting of isolated words or names from a language. In most cases, some form of the language had already been spoken (and even written) considerably earlier than the dates of the earliest extant samples provided here.

A written record may encode a stage of a language corresponding to an earlier time, either as a result of oral tradition, or because the earliest source is a copy of an older manuscript that was lost. An oral tradition of epic poetry may typically bridge a few centuries, and in rare cases, over a millennium. An extreme case is the Vedic Sanskrit of the Rigveda: the earliest parts of this text date to c. 1500 BC, while the oldest known manuscripts date to c. 1040 AD. Similarly the oldest Avestan texts, the Gathas, are believed to have been composed before 1000 BC, but the oldest Avestan manuscripts date from the 13th century AD.

== Before 1000 BC ==
Writing first appeared in the Near East at the end of the 4th millennium BC. A very limited number of languages are attested in the area from before the Bronze Age collapse and the rise of alphabetic writing:

- the Sumerian, Hattic and Elamite language isolates,
- Hurrian from the small Hurro-Urartian family,
- Afro-Asiatic in the form of the Egyptian and Semitic languages and
- Indo-European (Anatolian languages and Mycenaean Greek).

In East Asia towards the end of the second millennium BC, the Sino-Tibetan family was represented by Old Chinese.

There are also a number of undeciphered Bronze Age records:

- the Proto-Elamite script
- the Indus script (speculated to record a "Harappan language")
- Cretan hieroglyphs and Linear A (encoding a possible "Minoan language")
- the Cypro-Minoan syllabary

Earlier symbols, such as the Jiahu symbols or Vinča symbols, are believed to be proto-writing, rather than representations of language.

Date	Language	Attestation	Notes
c. 2690 BC	Egyptian	Egyptian hieroglyphs constituting the earliest complete sentence known, found in the tomb of Seth-Peribsen (2nd Dynasty), Umm El Qa'ab. This sentence refers to the entombed king's father and translates as, "He has united the Two Lands for his son, Dual King Peribsen."	So-called "proto-hieroglyphic" inscriptions, such as those on the Narmer Palette, are known from 3300 BC on, although these instances of written Egyptian are rebus-like and confined to semi-grammatical captions, labels, and proper names. See also, Naqada III and Abydos, Egypt.
c. 2600 BC	Sumerian	Instructions of Shuruppak, the Kesh temple hymn and other cuneiform texts from Shuruppak and Abu Salabikh (Fara period)	"Proto-literate" period from about 3500 BC (see Kish tablet); administrative records at Uruk and Ur from c. 2900 BC. Various texts from Ur during the Early Dynastic I–II period (c. 2800 BC) show syllabic elements with clear signs of the Sumerian language.
c. 2600 BC	Akkadian	A hymn to the sun-god Šamaš found at Tell Abū Ṣalābīḫ.	Some proper names attested in Sumerian texts at Tell Harmal from about 2800 BC. Fragments of the Legend of Etana at Tell Harmal c. 2600 BC. A few dozen pre-Sargonic texts from Mari and other sites in northern Babylonia.
c. 2400 BC	Eblaite	Ebla tablets	
24th century BC	Northwest Semitic	Protective spells in Pyramid Texts 235, 236, 281, 286 from the Pyramid of Unas, written in hieroglyphic script but unintelligible as Egyptian	Ugaritic is the earliest Northwest Semitic language to be unambiguously attested within its native context, c. 1300 BC.
c. 2250 BC	Elamite	Awan dynasty peace treaty with Naram-Sin	The Proto-Elamite script attested from c. 3100 BC remains undeciphered. A proposed decipherment of the Linear Elamite script is not fully accepted.
21st century BC	Hurrian	Temple inscription of Tish-atal in Urkesh	
c. 1800 BC	Amorite	Bilingual Amorite-Akkadian vocabulary	See also tablet CUNES 50-11-020 (P411253)
c. 1700 BC	Hittite	Anitta text in Hittite cuneiform	Isolated Hittite words and names occur in Assyrian texts found at Kültepe, from the 19th century BC.
16th century BC	Palaic	Hittite texts CTH 751–754	
c. 1450 BC	Mycenaean Greek	Linear B tablet archive from Knossos	These are mostly administrative lists, with some complete sentences.
c. 1400 BC	Luwian	Hieroglyphic Luwian monumental inscriptions, Cuneiform Luwian tablets in the Hattusa archives	Isolated hieroglyphs appear on seals from the 18th century BC.
c. 1400 BC	Hattic	Hittite texts CTH 725–745	
c. 1300 BC	Ugaritic	Tablets from Ugarit	
c. 1250 BC	Old Chinese	Oracle bone and bronze inscriptions from the reign of Wu Ding	

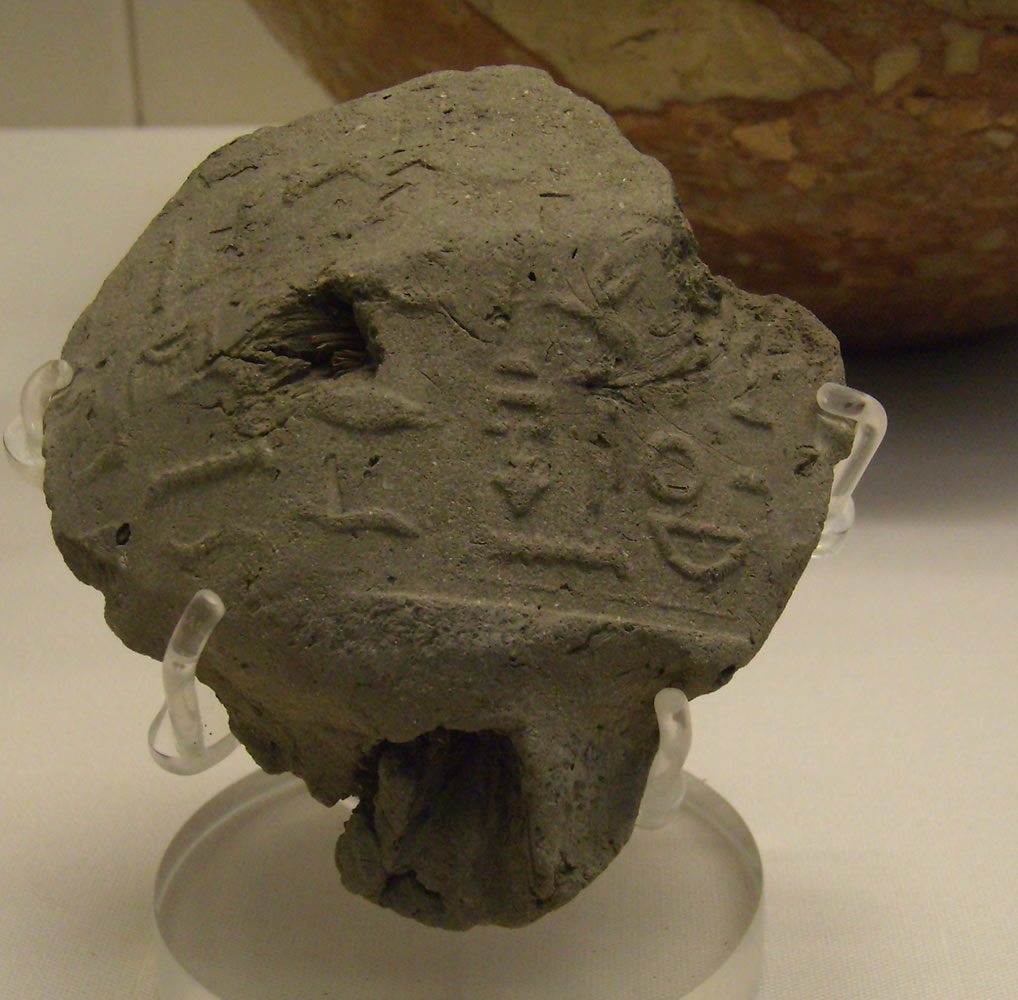
Seal impression from the tomb of Seth-Peribsen, containing the oldest known complete sentence in Egyptian, c. 2690 BC

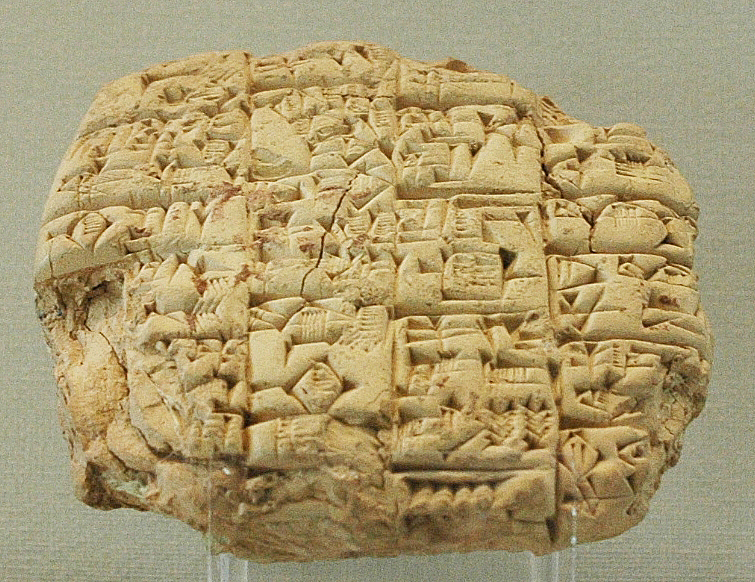
Letter in Sumerian cuneiform sent by the high-priest Lu'enna, informing the king of Lagash of his son's death in battle, c. 2400 BC

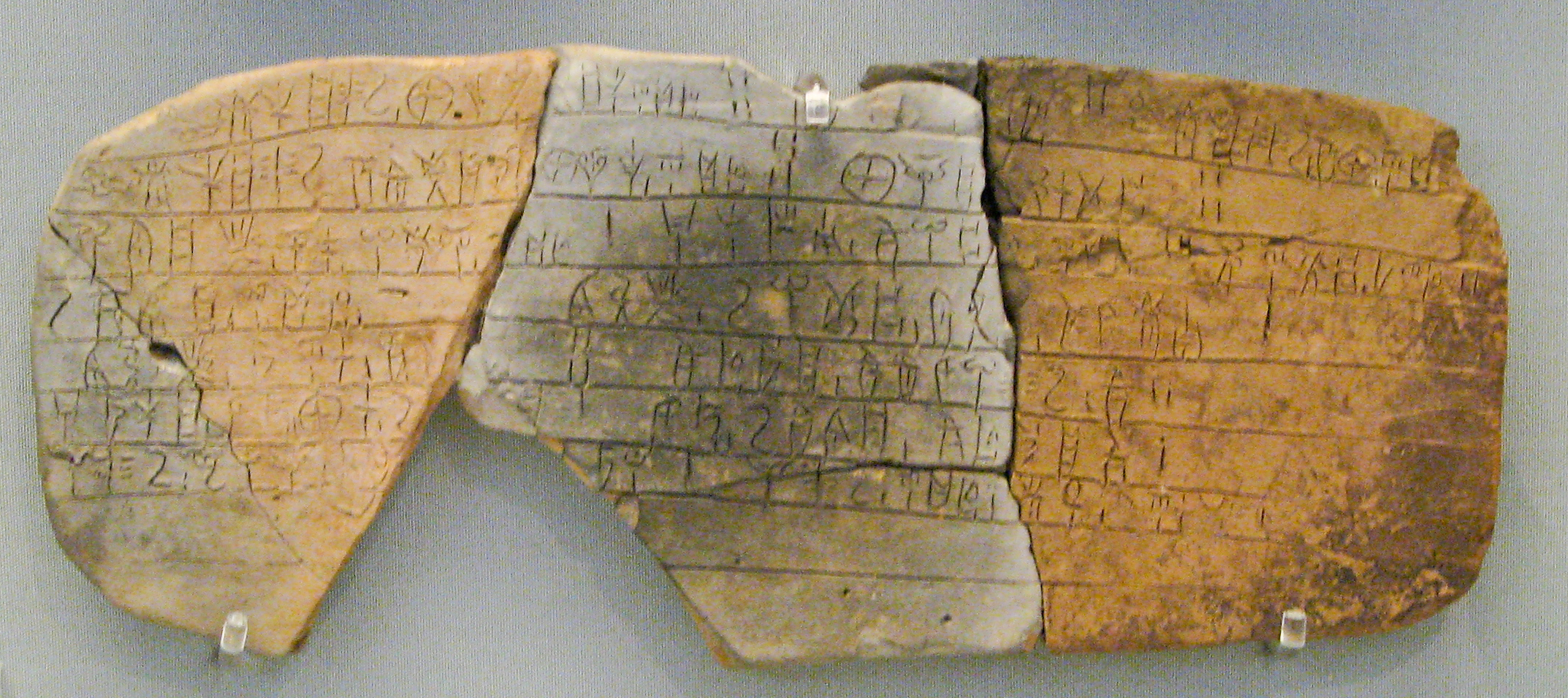
Greek Linear B tablet from Pylos, recording the distribution of hides, c. 1200 BC

Ox scapula inscribed with three records of divinations in the reign of Wu Ding of the Chinese Shang dynasty, c. 1200 BC

== First millennium BC ==
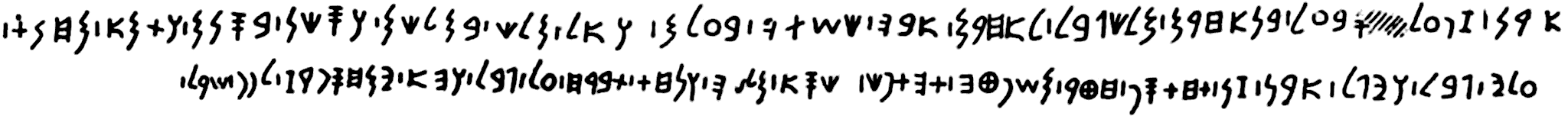
The Ahiram epitaph is the earliest substantial inscription in Phoenician.

The earliest known alphabetic inscriptions, at Serabit el-Khadim (c. 1500 BC), appear to record a Northwest Semitic language, though only one or two words have been deciphered. In the Early Iron Age, alphabetic writing spread across the Near East and southern Europe. With the emergence of the Brahmic family of scripts, languages of India are attested from after about 300 BC.

There is only fragmentary evidence for languages such as Iberian, Tartessian, Galatian and Messapian. The North Picene language of the Novilara Stele from c. 600 BC has not been deciphered. The few brief inscriptions in Thracian dating from the 6th and 5th centuries BC have not been conclusively deciphered. The earliest examples of the Central American Isthmian script date from c. 500 BC, but a proposed decipherment remains controversial.

Date	Language	Attestation	Notes
c. 1000 BC	Phoenician	Ahiram epitaph	
10th century BC	Aramaic	Royal inscriptions from Aramean city-states	
10th century BC	Hebrew or Phoenician	Gezer calendar	Paleo-Hebrew employed a slightly modified Phoenician alphabet, hence the uncertainty between which language is attested here.
c. 850 BC	Ammonite	Amman Citadel Inscription	
c. 840 BC	Moabite	Mesha Stele	
c. 820 BC	Urartian	Inscriptions in Assyrian cuneiform script	
c. 800 BC	Phrygian	Paleo-Phrygian inscriptions at Gordion	
8th century BC	Sabaean (Old South Arabian)	Mainly boustrophedon inscriptions from Yemen	
8th century BC	Old Arabic	Prayer inscription at Bayir, Jordan	It is a bi-lingual inscription written in Old Arabic which was written in the undifferentiated North Arabian script (known as Thamudic B) and Canaanite which remains undeciphered.
c. 700 BC	Etruscan	Proto-Corinthian vase found at Tarquinia	
7th century BC	Latin	Vetusia Inscription and Fibula Praenestina	
c. 600 BC	Lydian	Inscriptions from Sardis	
c. 600 BC	Carian	Inscriptions from Caria and Egypt	
c. 600 BC	Faliscan	Ceres inscription found at Falerii	
early 6th century BC	Umbrian	Text painted on the handle of a krater found near Tolfa	
c. 550 BC	Taymanitic	Esk 168 and 177	The Taymanitic script is mentioned in an 8th-century BC document from Carchemish.
c. 550 BC	South Picene	Warrior of Capestrano	
mid-6th century BC	Venetic	Funerary inscriptions at Este	
late 6th century BC	Lemnian	Lemnos Stele	
c. 500 BC	Old Persian	Behistun Inscription	
c. 500 BC	Lepontic	Inscriptions CO-48 from Pristino (Como) and VA-6 from Vergiate (Varese)	Inscriptions from the early 6th century consist of isolated names.
c. 300 BC	Oscan	Lovilae from Capua	Coin legends date from the late 5th century BC.
3rd century BC	Gaulish	Transalpine Gaulish inscriptions in Massiliote Greek script	
3rd century BC	Volscian	Tabula Veliterna	
c. 260 BC	Ashokan Prakrit	Edicts of Ashoka	Potsherds inscribed with Brahmi letters from Anuradhapura have been dated c. 400 BC, and range from isolated letters to names in the genitive case.
c. 200 BC	Elu (Sri Lankan Prakrit)	Brahmi inscription at Mihintale	
early 2nd century BC	Old Tamil	Rock inscription ARE 465/1906 at Mangulam caves, Tamil Nadu (Other authors give dates from late 3rd century BC to 1st century AD.)	Pottery inscribed with personal names has been found at Keeladi, a site that was occupied between the 6th century BC and 1st century AD. 5th century BC inscriptions on potsherds found in Kodumanal, Porunthal and Palani have been claimed as Tamil-Brahmi, but this is disputed. An inscription of 7 symbols from Adichanallur, tentatively dated 5th century BC, has been claimed as rudimentary Tamil-Brahmi.
2nd century BC	Meroitic	Graffiti on the temple of Amun at Dukki Gel, near Kerma	
c. 146 BC	Numidian	Punic-Libyan Inscription at Dougga	
c. 100 BC	Celtiberian	Botorrita plaques	
1st century BC	Parthian	Ostraca at Nisa and Qumis	
1st century BC	Sanskrit	Ayodhya Inscription of Dhana, and Hathibada Ghosundi Inscriptions (both near Chittorgarh)	The Junagadh rock inscription of Rudradaman (shortly after 150 AD) is the oldest long text.

== First millennium AD ==
From Late Antiquity, we have for the first time languages with earliest records in manuscript tradition (as opposed to epigraphy). Thus, Classical Armenian is first attested in the Armenian Bible translation.

The Vimose inscriptions (2nd and 3rd centuries) in the Elder Futhark runic alphabet appear to record Proto-Norse names. Some scholars interpret the Negau helmet inscription (c. 100 BC) as a Germanic fragment.

Date	Language	Attestation	Notes
c. 150	Bactrian	Rabatak inscription	
c. 200	Proto-Norse	inscription NITHIJO TAWIDE on shield grip from the Illerup Ådal weapon deposit	Single Proto-Norse words are found on the Øvre Stabu spearhead (second half of the 2nd century) and the Vimose Comb (c. 160).
292	Mayan	Stela 29 from Tikal	A brief undeciphered inscription at San Bartolo is dated to the 3rd century BC.
312–313	Sogdian	Ancient Letters, found near Dunhuang	
328	Arabic	Namara inscription	
c. 350	Ge'ez	inscriptions of Ezana of Aksum	
c. 350	Cham	Đông Yên Châu inscription found near Tra Kiêu	Oldest attested Austronesian language
4th century	Gothic	Gothic Bible, translated by Wulfila	A few problematic Gothic runic inscriptions may date to the early 4th century.
c. 400	Tocharian B	THT 274 and similar manuscripts	Some Tocharian names and words have been found in Prakrit documents from Krorän dated c. 300.
c. 430	Old Georgian	Bir el Qutt inscription #1	Inscription #2, made around the same time, is currently missing.
c. 450	Old Kannada	Halmidi inscription	A date of 350 has been claimed for the Tagarthi inscription found in Shivamogga district, but this is disputed. Kavirajamarga (c. 850) is the oldest literary work.
c. 478–490	Classical Armenian	inscription at the Tekor Basilica	Mesrop Mashtots is traditionally held to have translated an Armenian Bible in 434.
5th century	Frankish/Old Dutch	Bergakker inscription	There is no consensus on the interpretation of the text, leading to the language uncertainty.
c. 510	Old Dutch	formula for freeing a serf in the Malbergse Glossen on the Salic law	Some scholars consider the formula to be in Frankish instead.
6th century	Mon	Inscription in Wat Pho Rang Temple, Nakhon Pathom	
6th century	Vandalic	A sentence in the Collatio beati Augustini cum Pascentio ariano (Biblioteca Nazionale Universitaria, MS G.V. 26)	Copy of a text originally written in the first half of the 5th century.
second half of 6th century	Old High German	Pforzen buckle	
mid-6th century	Old Korean	Mokgan No. 221	
c. 575	Telugu	Erragudipadu inscription	Telugu place names are found in Prakrit inscriptions from the 2nd century AD.
c. 584	Old Mongolian	Bugut inscription	The inscription of Hüis Tolgoi is dated between 604 and 620. Both are written in Brahmi script.
611	Old Khmer	Angkor Borei inscription K. 557/600	
c. 650	Old Japanese	mokkan wooden tablets	Poems in the Kojiki (711–712) and Nihon Shoki (720) have been transmitted in copied manuscripts.
c. 650–700	Old Udi	Sinai palimpsest M13	
c. 683	Old Malay	Kedukan Bukit Inscription	
7th century	Bailang	commentary on the Book of the Later Han by Li Xian citing the mostly lost Dongguan Hanji	
7th century	Tumshuqese and Khotanese Saka	manuscripts mainly from Dunhuang	Some fragments of Khotanese Saka have been dated to the 5th and 6th centuries
7th century	Beja	ostracon from Saqqara	
late 7th century	Pyu	Hpayahtaung funeral urn inscription of kings of Sri Ksetra	
c. 700	Old English	Franks Casket	The Undley bracteate (5th century) and West Heslerton brooch (c. 650) have fragmentary runic inscriptions.
c. 716	Old Turkic	Tonyukuk inscriptions	Çoyr inscription have been dated 688–691.
c. 750	Old Irish	Würzburg glosses	Primitive Irish Ogham inscriptions from the 4th century consist of personal names, patronymics and/or clan names.
c. 760	Apabhraṃśa	Akhara Bāḍhā Sa'ala Jagu	An Apabhramsa poem attributed to Saraha, a Vajrayana Mahasiddha saint. The poem is dated to around 760 AD and its language has close affinities to Punjabi.
c. 765	Old Tibetan	Lhasa Zhol Pillar	Dated entries in the Tibetan Annals begin at 650, but extant manuscripts postdate the Tibetan occupation of Dunhuang in 786.
late 8th century	Breton	Praecepta medica (Leyden, Codex Vossianus Lat. F. 96 A)	A botanical manuscript in Latin and Breton
c. 750–900	Old Frisian	Westeremden yew-stick	
c. 800	Old Norse	runic inscriptions	
804	Old Javanese	initial part of the Sukabumi inscription (id), found near Kediri	
early 9th century	Old Saxon	Heiland and Old Saxon Genesis, found in Palatinus Latinus 1447	The 9th century Old Saxon Baptismal Vow appears to be a copy from the 8th century; however, scholars dispute whether it is in Old Saxon or another Germanic language
9th century	Old Malayalam	Vazhappally copper plate	The status of the Edakkal-5 inscriptions dating back to 3rd or late 4th century is contested.Ramacaritam (12th century) is the oldest literary work.
9th century	Old Welsh	Cadfan Stone (Tywyn 2)	
late 9th century	Old French	Sequence of Saint Eulalia	The earliest surviving manuscript with the text for the Oaths of Strasbourg (842), traditionally considered the first Old French text, dates from the 11th century.
9th century–12th century	Chechen	Slab inscription in Bavloy	Earliest text written in Chechen; written in the Asomtavruli script. Several early Chechen inscriptions containing individual words, names, and small sentences have been found in places such as Tsoi-Peda, Keishta and Zumsoi.
882	Balinese	dated royal inscription	
c. 900	Old Occitan	Tomida femina	
c. 959–974	Old Leonese	Nodicia de Kesos	
c. 960–963	Italian	Placiti Cassinesi	The Veronese Riddle (c. 800) is considered a mixture of Italian and Latin.
986	Khitan	Memorial for Yelü Yanning	
late 10th century	Old Church Slavonic	Kiev Missal	Cyril and Methodius translated religious literature from c. 862, but only later manuscripts survive.
late 10th century	Konkani/Marathi	inscription on the Gommateshwara statue	The inscription is in Devanagari script, but the language has been disputed between Marathi and Konkani scholars.
10th century	Romansh	a sentence in the Würzburg manuscript	

== 1000–1500 AD ==
Date	Language	Attestation	Notes
972–1093	Slovene	Freising manuscripts	
late 10th–early 11th century	Serbian	Codex Marianus, Temnić inscription	
c. 1000	Navarro-Aragonese (Aragonese) and Basque	Glosas Emilianenses	The first word on the Hand of Irulegi (1st century BC) has been claimed as Basque.
c. 1028	Catalan	Jurament Feudal	
1058	Burmese	inscription from Letthe-shé pagoda, Pagan, now at Pahtodawgyi	A brief Burmese inscription on a copper-gilded umbrella found near the Mahabodhi Temple is so damaged that only a name can be made out with certainty; the Pali version gives a date corresponding to 1035. There are also 18th century copies (of uncertain authenticity) of inscriptions dating back as far as 984.
1072–1074	Oghuz Turkic (including Turkmen, Azerbaijani and Ottoman Turkish)	Dīwān Lughāt al-Turk by Mahmud al-Kashgari	The first comprehensive dictionary of Turkic languages, written in Arabic, contains many Oghuz words and phrases.
11th century	Mozarabic	kharjas appended to Arabic and Hebrew poems	Isolated words are found in glossaries from the 8th century.
c. 11th century	Luri	poems by Baba Tahir	Some scholars believe that his works are in Persian
c. 11th century	Croatian	Humac tablet (variously dated to between the 10th and 12th century), Inscription of Krk, Inscription of Župa Dubrovačka, Plomin tablet, Valun tablet	
c. 1100	Ossetian	Zelančuk inscription	
early 12th century	Scottish Gaelic	Book of Deer	
1114	Newar	palm-leaf manuscript from Uku Baha, Patan	
1127	Jurchen	inscription found on the bank of the Arkhara River	
c. 1175	Galician-Portuguese	Notícia de Fiadores	The Notícia de Torto and the will of Afonso II of Portugal, dated 1214, are often cited as the first documents written in Galician-Portuguese. A date prior to 1175 has been proposed for the Pacto dos Irmãos Pais.
1192	Old Hungarian	Funeral Sermon and Prayer	There are isolated fragments in earlier charters such as the charter of Veszprém (c. 1000) and the charter of Tihany (1055). Some scholars believe that the language of the Szarvas inscription (8th century) is Old Hungarian.
mid-12th century	Icelandic	AM 237 a fol. manuscript	
late 12th century	Old Norwegian	AM 655 IX 4to manuscript	
late 12th century	Bosnian	copies A, B, and C of the Charter of Ban Kulin	Originally created in 1189
c. 1200	Spanish	Cantar de mio Cid	Previously the Glosas Emilianenses and the Nodicia de kesos were considered the oldest texts in Spanish; however, later analyses concluded them to be Aragonese and Leonese, respectively.
c. 1200	Livvi Karelian	Birch bark letter no. 292	
c. 1200–1230	Czech	founding charter of the Litoměřice chapter	
1224–1225	Mongolian	Stele of Genghis Khan	
early 13th century	Punjabi	poetry of Fariduddin Ganjshakar	
early 13th century	Cornish	prophesy in the cartulary of Glasney College	A 9th century gloss in De Consolatione Philosophiae by Boethius: ud rocashaas is controversially interpreted.
c. 1250	Old Swedish	fragments of the elder Westrogothic law in Codex Holm. B 193	
c. 1250	Kashmiri	Mahanayakaprakash ("Light of the supreme lord") by Shitikantha	
c. 1270	Old Polish	a sentence in the Book of Henryków	
1272	Yiddish	blessing in the Worms mahzor	
c. 1274	Western Lombard	Liber di Tre Scricciur, by Bonvesin de la Riva	
c. 1292	Thai	Ramkhamhaeng stele	Some scholars argue that the stele is a forgery. The next oldest inscription is the Wat Sri Chum inscription from the early 14th century.
late 13th century	Old Danish	manuscripts AM 37 4to, AM 24 4to, SKB C 37, SKB B 74	
c. 1350	Oghuz Turkic (including Azerbaijani and Ottoman Turkish)	works of Imadaddin Nasimi	Inscriptions in Old Turkic script dated 9-10 centuries.
c. 1350	Old Gutnish	Gutasaga and Gutalagen, found in Codex Holm. B 64	
c. 1350	Old Sundanese	Astana Gede inscriptions	
c. 1369	Old Prussian	Basel Epigram	
1372	Komi	Abur inscriptions	
1386	Slovak	Rhymed sentence in Latin codex	Toponyms, personal names and glosses are found from 11th century.
early 14th century	Laki	poem dated 1316 in a manuscript	
c. 1407	Faroese	Letters about Húsavík (AM 100, 1a)	Earlier inscriptions on the islands (from c. 1000 AD at Kirkjubøur) are in Old Norse, with no particular Faroese content/
early 15th century	Bengali, Assamese and other Bengali-Assamese languages	poems of Chandidas	The 10th-century Charyapada are written in a language ancestral to Bengali, Assamese and Oriya.
c. 1430–1446	Kurmanji Kurdish	Christian prayer preserved in an Armenian manuscript	
c. 1440	Vietnamese	Quốc âm thi tập	List of names in Chữ nôm date from the early 13th century.
1462	Gheg Albanian	Formula e pagëzimit, a baptismal formula in a letter of Archbishop Pal Engjëll	Some scholars interpret a few lines in the Bellifortis text (1405) as Albanian.
c. 1470	Finnish	single sentence in a German travel journal	Written attestations of Early Finnish consisting of names of people and locations recorded since at least the 13th century. The first printed book in Finnish is Abckiria (1543) by Mikael Agricola.
c. 1470	Maltese	Il Cantilena	
1485	Yi	bronze bell inscription in Dafang County, Guizhou	
15th century	Tosk Albanian	song using excerpts from the Gospel of Matthew in a Greek manuscript	
15th century	Gorani	Parishan-nama by Mele Perîşan	A poem allegedly written around the 7th-8th century about the Arabic invasion of Persia is believed to be a hoax by scholars
15th century	Tulu	inscriptions in an adaptation of Malayalam script	
15th century	Tigrinya	a text of laws found in Logosarda	Dating uncertain, found inside an unrelated evangelical codex from the 15th century

== After 1500 ==
Date	Language	Attestation	Notes
c. 1503	Lithuanian	hand-written Lord's Prayer, Hail Mary and Creed	Katekizmas (1547) by Martynas Mažvydas was the first printed book in Lithuanian.
1517	Belarusian	Psalter of Francysk Skaryna	
1521	Romanian	Neacșu's letter	Cyrillic orthographic manual of Constantine of Kostenets from 1420 documents earlier written usage. Four 16th-century documents, namely Codicele Voronețean, Psaltirea Scheiană, the Hurmuzaki Psalter and Psaltirea Voronețeană, are arguably copies of 15th-century originals.
1530	Latvian	Nicholas Ramm's translation of a hymn	
1535	Estonian	Wanradt-Koell catechism	
1536	Modern Portuguese	Grammatica da lingoagem portuguesa by Fernão de Oliveira.	by convention.
1540s	Old Tupi	Jehan Lamy's Le langaige du Bresil	
1543	Purépecha	La Memoria de Don Melchor Caltzin	
1549	Sylheti	Talib Husan by Ghulam Husan	earliest extant manuscript found using the Sylheti Nagri script.
1550	Classical Nahuatl	Doctrina cristiana en lengua española y mexicana	The Breve y mas compendiosa doctrina cristiana en lengua mexicana y castellana (1539) was possibly the first printed book in the New World. No copies are known to exist today.
1554	Extremaduran (mixed with Sayaguese Leonese)	works of Diego Sánchez de Badajoz, published as edited by his nephew as Recopilación en metro	
1554	Wastek	grammar by Andrés de Olmos	
1557	Kikongo	a catechism	
1561	Ukrainian	Peresopnytsia Gospel	
1589	Crimean Gothic	1562 letter from Ogier Ghiselin de Busbecq that was published later	9th century Gothic graffiti in Crimea show some Crimean Gothic influence in spelling.
1593	Tagalog	Doctrina Cristiana	
c. 1600	Classical Quechua	Huarochirí Manuscript by a writer identified only as "Thomás"	Paraphrased and annotated by Francisco de Ávila in 1608.
1600	Buginese		
c. 1610	Manx	Book of Common Prayer	
1619	Pite Sámi	primer and missal by Nicolaus Andreaus	Early literary works were mainly based on dialects underlying modern Ume Sámi and Pite Sámi. First grammar and dictionary in 1738.
1638	Ternate	treaty with Dutch governor	
1639	Guarani	Tesoro de la lengua guaraní by Antonio Ruíz de Montoya	
1639	modern Asturian	Cuando examen les abeyes by Antón de Marirreguera	
1642	Kimbundu	Gentio de Angola sufficientemente instruido nos mysterios de nossa sancta Fé by Francesco Pacconio and Antonio do Couto	
c. 1650	Ubykh, Abkhaz, Adyghe and Mingrelian	Travel Book of Evliya Çelebi	
1651	Pashto	copy of Xayru 'l-bayān in the library of the University of Tübingen	The Pata Khazana, purporting to date from the 8th century, is considered by most scholars to be a forgery.
1663	Massachusett	Mamusse Wunneetupanatamwe Up-Biblum God	Also known as the Eliot Indian Bible or the Algonquian Bible
1668	Ume Sámi	Translation of Thesaurus catecheticus by Olaus Stephani Graan	
1693	Tunisian Arabic	copy of a Tunisian poem written by Sheykh Hassan el-Karray	Before 1700, lyrics of songs were not written in Tunisian Arabic but in Classical Arabic.
c. 1695	Seri	grammar and vocabulary compiled by Adamo Gilg	No longer known to exist.
17th century	Hausa	Riwayar Annabi Musa by Abdallah Suka	
late 17th century	Basque–Icelandic pidgin	Vocabula Gallica	
early 18th century	Karelian	various handwritten Karelian–Russian glossaries	A catechism from 1804 is the oldest known published text. Translated Christian works by a local scholar are first reported already by the 1560s, none of which have however survived or are known in any detail.
18th century	Língua Geral of São Paulo	Vocabulário da Língua Geral dos Índios das Américas (anonymous)	Another source is the dictionary by Carl Friedrich Philipp von Martius (1867) and the vocabulary (1936) by José Joaquim Machado de Oliveira. The language is now extinct.
1705	Hill Mari	Lord's Prayer from the book Noord en oost Tartarye (2nd edition) by Nicolaes Witsen	
1707	Sranan Tongo	court records from July of that year	
1711	Swahili	letters written in Kilwa	
1726	Udmurt	Unpublished Udmurt dictionary by Daniel Gottlieb Messerschmidt	Dictionary containing 400 Udmurt words. Written in Latin script. The first Udmurt literary text was a small poem published in a multilingual collection commemorating Empress Catherine II arrival in Kazan in 1769. It was written in Cyrillic.
1728	Northern Sámi	Catechism	An early wordlist was published in 1589 by Richard Hakluyt. First grammar in 1743
1731	Aromanian	Quadruple-language (Albanian, Aromanian, Greek, Latin) prayer inscription in Ardenica Monastery by Nektarios Terpos	
1736	Greenlandic	Grönländische Grammatica by Paul Egede	A poor-quality wordlist was recorded by John Davis in 1586.
1743	Chinese Pidgin English	sentence recorded in Macau by George Anson	
1747	Borgarmålet	Beskrifning öfwer Sweriges Lapmarker by Pehr Högström	
1757	Haitian Creole	Lisette quitté la plaine by Duvivier de la Mahautière	
1762	Sorani Kurdish	Mahdîname by Mulla Muhammad Ibn ul-Haj’	
1788	Sydney language	notebooks of William Dawes	
1795	Afrikaans	Lied ter eere van de Swellendamsche en diverse andere helden bij de bloedige actie aan Muisenburg	
1800	Inuktitut	"Eskimo Grammar" by Moravian missionaries	A list of 17 words was recorded in 1576 by Christopher Hall, an assistant to Martin Frobisher.
1806	Tswana	Heinrich Lictenstein – Upon the Language of the Beetjuana	The first complete Bible translation was published in 1857 by Robert Moffat.
1819	Cherokee		Sequoyah's Cherokee syllabary
1820	Maori	grammar by Thomas Kendall and Samuel Lee	Kendal began compiling wordlists in 1814.
1820	Aleut	description by Rasmus Rask	A short word list was collected by James King in 1778.
1822	Hawaiian	a primer printed by missionaries	
1823	Xhosa	John Bennie's Xhosa reading sheet	Complete Bible translation 1859
c. 1833	Vai		Vai syllabary created by Momolu Duwalu Bukele.
1833	Sotho	reduced to writing by French missionaries Casalis and Arbousset	First grammar book 1841 and complete Bible translation 1881
1834	Muscogee	Mʊskoki imʊnaitsʊ (Muskokee (Creek) Assistant) by John Fleming	The first recorded Muscogee words have been made by Germans in the area of Savannah, Georgia, such as Philip Georg Friedrich von Reck, who drew illustrations of wildlife in his notebook with labels in Muscogee in 1736.
1837	Ojibwe	The speller and interpreter, in Indian and English by James Evans	Evans would subsequently publish an Ojibwe syllabary.
1837	Zulu	Incwadi Yokuqala Yabafundayo	First grammar book 1859 and complete Bible translation 1883
1839	Lule Sámi	pamphlet by Lars Levi Laestadius	Dictionary and grammar by Karl Bernhard Wiklund in 1890–1891
1841	Cree	hymnbook published by James Evans	
1845	Santali	A Santali Primer by Jeremiah Phillips	
1849	Solombala English	Ocerki Arxangel'skoj Gubernii by Vasilij Vereščagin	
1851	Sakha (Yakut)	Über die Sprache der Jakuten, a grammar by Otto von Böhtlingk	Wordlists were included in Noord en Oost Tartarije (1692) by Nicolaas Witsen and Das Nord-und Ostliche Theil von Europa und Asia (1730) by Philip Johan von Strahlenberg.
1854	Inari Sámi	grammar by Elias Lönnrot	Primer and catechism published in 1859.
1856	Gamilaraay	articles by William Ridley	Basic vocabulary collected by Thomas Mitchell in 1832.
1858	Zaza	sentence transcribed by Pyotr Lerkh in Izsledovaniya ob iranskikh kurdakh i ikh predkakh, severnykh khaldeyakh	
1864	Français Tirailleur	letter by P. Durpatz	
1872	Venda	reduced to writing by the Berlin Missionaries	First complete Bible translation 1936
1878	Kildin Sámi	Gospel of Matthew	
1882	Mirandese	O dialecto mirandez by José Leite de Vasconcelos	The same author also published the first book written in Mirandese: Flores mirandezas (1884)
1884	Skolt Sámi	Gospel of Matthew in Cyrillic	
1885	Carrier	Barkerville Jail Text, written in pencil on a board in the then recently created Carrier syllabics	Although the first known text by native speakers dates to 1885, the first record of the language is a list of words recorded in 1793 by Alexander MacKenzie.
1885	Motu	grammar by W.G. Lawes	
1886	Guugu Yimidhirr	notes by Johann Flierl, Wilhelm Poland and Georg Schwarz, culminating in Walter Roth's The Structure of the Koko Yimidir Language in 1901.	A list of 61 words recorded in 1770 by James Cook and Joseph Banks was the first written record of an Australian language.
1891	Galela	grammatical sketch by M.J. van Baarda	
1893	Oromo	translation of the New Testament by Onesimos Nesib, assisted by Aster Ganno	
1900	Qaqet	grammar by Matthäus Rascher	
1903	Lingala	grammar by Egide de Boeck	
1905	Istro-Romanian	Calindaru lu rumeri din Istrie by Andrei Glavina and Constantin Diculescu	Compilation of Istro-Romanian popular words, proverbs and stories.
c. 1940	Kamoro	materials by Peter Drabbe	A Kamoro wordlist recorded in 1828 by Modera and Müller, passengers on a Dutch ship, is the oldest record of any of the non-Austronesian languages of New Guinea.
1968	Southern Ndebele	small booklet published with praises of their kings and a little history	A translation of the New Testament of the Bible was completed in 1986; translation of the Old Testament is ongoing.
1984	Gooniyandi	survey by William B. McGregor	

== By family ==
Attestation by major language family:

- Afro-Asiatic: since about the 27th century BC
  - 27th century BC: Egyptian
  - 24th century BC: Semitic (Eblaite, Akkadian)
  - 2nd century BC: Berberic (Numidian)
  - 7th century: Cushitic (Blemmyan)
- Hurro-Urartian: c. 21st century BC
- Indo-European: since about the 17th century BC
  - 17th century BC: Anatolian (Hittite)
  - 15th century BC: Greek
  - 7th century BC: Italic (Latin)
  - 6th century BC: Celtic (Lepontic)
  - c. 6th century BC: Iranian (Old Persian)
  - c. 3rd century BC: Indo-Aryan (Ashokan Prakrit)
  - 4th century AD: Germanic (Gothic)
  - 4th century AD: Tocharian (Tocharian B)
  - 4th century AD: Armenian (Classical Armenian)
  - 10th century: Slavic (Old Church Slavonic)
  - c. 14th century: Baltic (Old Prussian)
  - c. 15th century: Albanian
- Sino-Tibetan: c. 13th century BC
  - c. 13th century BC: Old Chinese
  - 8th century: Tibeto-Burman (Tibetan)
- Dravidian: c. 3rd century BC (Tamil)
- Mayan: 3rd century AD
  - 3rd century AD: Cholan (Classical Maya)
  - 16th century: Huastecan (Wastek)
- Austronesian: 4th century AD (Cham)
- South Caucasian: 5th century AD (Georgian)
- Koreanic: mid-6th century (Old Korean)
- Mongolic: 6th century (Mongolian)
- Northeast Caucasian: 7th century
  - 7th century: Lezgic (Udi)
  - 9–12th century: Nakh (Chechen)
- Austroasiatic: 7th century (Khmer)
- Turkic: 7th century
  - 7th century: Old Turkic
  - 11th century: Oghuz
- Japonic: 8th century
- Nilo-Saharan: 8th century (Old Nubian)
- Basque: c. 11th century
- Uralic: 12th century
  - 12th century: Ugric (Hungarian)
  - c. 13th century: Finnic
  - 14th century: Permic (Komi)
  - 17th century: Sámic (Pite Sámi)
  - 18th century: Mari (Hill Mari)
- Kra–Dai: 13th century (Thai)
- Tupian: 16th century (Classical Tupi)
- Purépecha: 16th century
- Uto-Aztecan: 16th century (Classical Nahuatl)
- Quechuan: 16th century (Classical Quechua)
- Niger–Congo (Bantu): 16th century (Kikongo)
- Papuan: 17th century (Ternate)
- Northwest Caucasian: 17th century (Abkhaz, Adyghe, Ubykh)
- Algic: 17th century
  - 17th century: East Algonquian (Massachusett)
  - 19th century: Ojibwe
  - 19th century: Cree
- Muskogean: 17th century (Apalachee)
- Seri: c. 17th century
- Eskaleut: 18th century
  - 18th century: Inuit (Greenlandic)
  - 19th century: Aleut
- Australian Aboriginal: 18th century
- Iroquoian: 19th century (Cherokee)
- Na-Dene: 19th century (Carrier)
- Hmong-Mien: 20th century

== Constructed languages ==
Date	Language	Attestation	Notes
1879	Volapük		Created by Johann Martin Schleyer
1887	Esperanto	Unua Libro	Created by L. L. Zamenhof
1907	Ido		Created based on Esperanto
1917	Quenya		Created by J. R. R. Tolkien
1921	Interlingue (Occidental)	Transcendent Algebra	Created by Edgar de Wahl
1928	Novial		Created by Otto Jespersen
1935	Sona	Sona, an auxiliary neutral language	Created by Kenneth Searight
1943	Interglossa		Created by Lancelot Hogben
1951	Interlingua	Interlingua–English Dictionary	Created by the International Auxiliary Language Association
1955	Loglan		Created by James Cooke Brown
1984	Klingon	Star Trek III: The Search for Spock	Created by Marc Okrand
1987	Lojban		based on Loglan, created by the Logical Language Group
1999	Slovio		Created by Mark Hučko
2001	Atlantean	Atlantis: The Lost Empire	Created by Marc Okrand
2001	Toki Pona		Created by Sonja Lang
2004	Ithkuil		Created by John Quijada
2005	Na'vi	Avatar	Created by Dr. Paul Frommer and James Cameron
2009	Dothraki		Created by George R. R. Martin and David J. Peterson for Game of Thrones
2013	Kiliki	Baahubali: The Beginning, Baahubali 2: The Conclusion	Created by Madhan Karky for Baahubali: The Beginning

== See also ==
- Ancient text corpora
- History of writing
- List of writing systems
- Undeciphered writing systems
- Origin of language
- Ancient literature § Incomplete list of ancient texts
- List of oldest documents
