= Runic inscriptions =

Inscription made in a runic alphabet

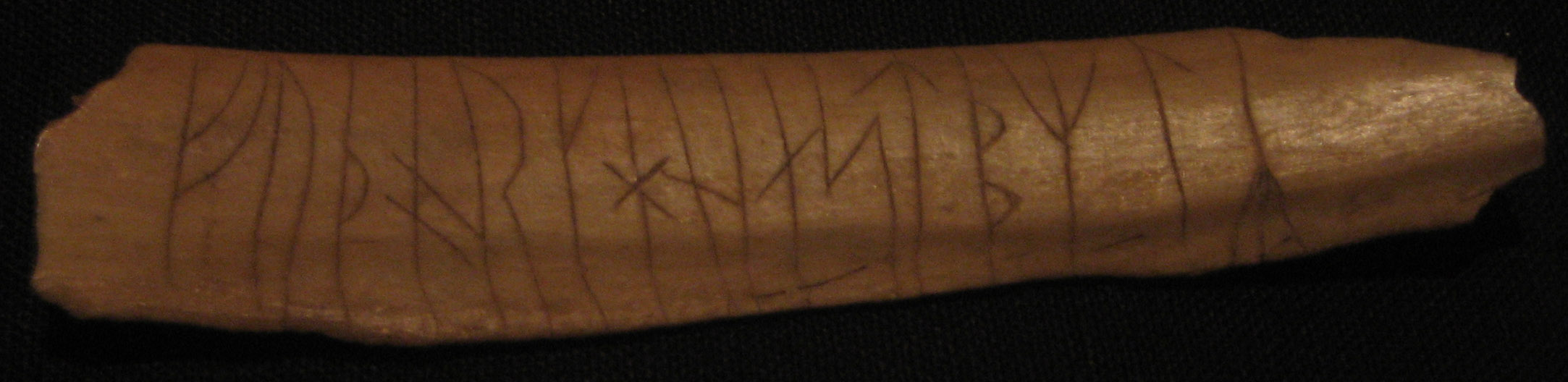
Younger futhark rune-row inscription on bone.

A runic inscription is an inscription made in one of the various runic alphabets. They generally contained practical information or memorials instead of magic or mythic stories. The body of runic inscriptions falls into the three categories of Elder Futhark (some 350 items, dating to between the 2nd and 8th centuries AD), Anglo-Frisian Futhorc (some 100 items, 5th to 11th centuries) and Younger Futhark (close to 6,000 items, 8th to 12th centuries).

The total 350 known inscriptions in the Elder Futhark script fall into two main geographical categories, North Germanic (Scandinavian, c. 267 items) and Continental or South Germanic ("German" and Gothic, c. 81 items). These inscriptions are on many types of loose objects, but the North Germanic tradition shows a preference for bracteates, while the South Germanic one has a preference for fibulae. The precise figures are debatable because some inscriptions are very short and/or illegible so that it is uncertain whether they qualify as inscriptions at all.

The division into Scandinavian, North Sea (Anglo-Frisian), and South Germanic inscriptions makes sense from the 5th century. In the 3rd and 4th centuries, the Elder Futhark script was still in its early phase of development, with inscriptions concentrated in what is now Denmark and Northern Germany.

The tradition of runic literacy continued in Scandinavia into the Viking Age, developing into the Younger Futhark script. Close to 6,000 Younger Futhark inscriptions are known, many of them on runestones.

== Statistics ==
=== Number of known inscriptions ===
The following table lists the number of known inscriptions (in any alphabet variant) by geographical region:

Area	Number of runic inscriptions
Sweden	3,432
Norway	1,552
Denmark	844
Scandinavian total	5,826
Continental Europe except Scandinavia and Frisia	80
Frisia	20
The British Isles except Ireland	> 200
Greenland	> 100
Iceland	< 100
Ireland	16
Faroes	9
Turkey	2
Non-Scandinavian total	> 500
Total	> 6,400

=== Estimates of total number of inscriptions produced ===
Elder Futhark inscriptions were rare, with very few active literati, in relation to the total population, at any time, so that knowledge of the runes was probably an actual "secret" throughout the Migration period. Of 366 lances excavated at Illerup, only 2 bore inscriptions. A similar ratio is estimated for Alemannia, with an estimated 170 excavated graves to every inscription found. Estimates of the total number of inscriptions produced are based on the "minimal runological estimate" of 40,000 (ten individuals making ten inscriptions per year for four centuries). The actual number was probably considerably higher, maybe close to 400,000 in total, so that on the order of 0.1% of the corpus has come down to us, and Fischer estimates a population of several hundred active literati throughout the period, with as many as 1,600 during the Alamannic "runic boom" of the 6th century.

== Types of inscribed objects ==
Especially the earliest inscriptions are found on all types of everyday objects. Later, a preference for valuable or prestigious objects (jewelry or weapons) seems to develop, inscriptions often indicating ownership.

- jewelry
  - bracteates: some 133 Elder Futhark inscriptions, popular during the Scandinavian Germanic Iron Age / Vendel era
  - fibulae: some 50 Elder Futhark inscriptions, popular in 6th to 7th century Alemannia
  - brooches: Boarley (Kent), Harford (Norfolk) brooch, West Heslerton (North Yorkshire), Wakerley (Northamptonshire), Dover (Kent)
  - belt parts (plaques, buckles, strap-ends): Vimose buckle, Pforzen buckle, Heilbronn-Böckingen, Szabadbattyan
  - rings: six known Anglo-Saxon runic rings, a few examples from Alemannia (Vörstetten-Schupfholz, Pforzen, Aalen neck-ring)
  - amber: Weingarten amber-pearl
- Weapon parts
  - seaxes: Thames scramasax, Steindorf, Hailfingen
  - spearheads: Vimose, Kovel, Dahmsdorf-Müncheberg, Wurmlingen
  - swords and sword-sheaths: Vimose chape, Vimose sheathplate, Thorsberg chape, Schretzheim ring-sword, Ash Gilton (Kent) gilt silver sword pommel, Chessel Down II (Isle of Wight) silver plate (attached to the scabbard mouthpiece of a ring-sword), Sæbø sword
- coins: Skanomody solidus, Harlingen solidus, Schweindorf solidus, Folkestone tremissis, Midlum sceat, Kent II coins (some 30 items), Kent III, IV silver sceattas, Suffolk gold shillings (three items), Upper Thames Valley gold coins (four items)
- boxes or containers: Franks Casket, Schretzheim capsule, Gammertingen case, Ferwerd combcase, Kantens combcase
- runestones: Earliest datable is the Hole runestone (50 BCE and 275 CE). Very popular for Viking Age Younger Futhark inscriptions.
- bone: Caistor-by-Norwich astragalus, Rasquert swordhandle (whalebone handle of a symbolic sword), Hantum whalebone plate, Bernsterburen whalebone staff, Hamwick horse knucklebone, Wijnaldum A antler piece
- pieces of wood: Vimose woodplane, Neudingen/Baar, Arum sword (a yew-wood miniature sword), Westeremden yew-stick
- cremation urns: Loveden Hill (Lincolnshire), Spong Hill (Norfolk)
- the Kleines Schulerloch inscription is a singular example of an inscription on a cave wall
- spindle whorls: Saltfleetby spindle whorl

== Early period (2nd to 4th centuries) ==
The earliest period of Elder Futhark (2nd to 4th centuries) predates the division in regional script variants, and linguistically essentially still reflect the Common Germanic stage. Their distribution is mostly limited to southern Scandinavia, northern Germany and Frisia (the "North Sea Germanic runic Koine"), with stray finds associated with the Goths from Romania and Ukraine. Linguistically, the 3rd and 4th centuries correspond to the formation of Proto-Norse, just predating the separation of West Germanic into Anglo-Frisian, Low German and High German.

- Hole Runestone (BC 50-AD 275), several inscriptions including idiberug/n and fuþ
- Vimose inscriptions (6 objects, AD 160–300)
- Ovre Stabu spearhead (c. 180), raunijaz
- Thorsberg chape (AD 200)
- Mos spearhead (c. 300), gaois(?)
- Nydam axe-handle (4th century): wagagastiz / alu:??hgusikijaz:aiþalataz
- Caistor-by-Norwich astragalus (AD 400)
- Illerup inscriptions (9 objects)

== Scandinavian ==
About 260 items in Elder Futhark, and close to 6,000 items (mostly runestones) in Younger Futhark. The highest concentration of Elder Futhark inscriptions is in Denmark.

An important Proto-Norse inscription was on one of the Golden Horns of Gallehus (early 5th century). A total of 133 known inscriptions on bracteates. There are several legible and partly interpretable inscription that date from the 1st half of the 5th century such as a Silver neck ring found near Aalen with "noru" inscribed in runic alphabets on its inner edge. others discoveries were unearthed around Germany, Denmark, Norway, Hungary, Belgium, England and Bosnia.

The oldest known runestones date to the early 5th century (Einang stone, Kylver Stone), although the Hole Runestone, discovered during excavations from 2021–2023, is dated even earlier. The longest known inscription in the Elder Futhark, and one of the youngest, consists of some 200 characters and is found on the early 8th-century Eggjum stone, and may even contain a stanza of Old Norse poetry.

The transition to Younger Futhark begins from the 6th century, with transitional examples like the Björketorp or Stentoften stones. In the early 9th century, both the older and the younger futhark were known and used, which is shown on the Rök runestone. By the 10th century, only Younger Futhark remained in use. Greenlandic Norse developed several distinct forms, in particular a version of reið (R) with two parallel sloping branches that is found in 14 Greenlandic inscriptions.

== Anglo-Frisian ==
Some 110 items (not including coins) spanning the 5th to 11th centuries. The 5th-century Undley bracteate is considered the earliest known Anglo-Frisian inscription.

The 8th-century Franks Casket, preserved during the Middle Ages in Brioude, central France, exhibits the longest coherent inscriptions in Anglo-Saxon runes by far, including five alliterating long-lines, qualifying as the oldest preserved Anglo-Saxon poetry.

While the Nordic bracteates are jewelry imitating Roman gold coins, there were a number of actual coins (currency) in Anglo-Saxon England inscribed with runes, notably the coins from Kent, inscribed with pada, æpa and epa (early 7th century).

There are a number of Christian inscriptions from the time of Christianization. St. Cuthbert's coffin, dated to 698, even has a runic monogram of Christ, and the Whitby II bone comb (7th century) has a pious plea for God's help, deus meus, god aluwaldo, helpæ Cy... "my God, almighty God, help Cy…". The Ruthwell Cross inscription could also be mentioned, but its authenticity is dubious; it might have been added only in the 10th century.

Unlike the situation on the continent, the tradition of runic writing does not disappear in England after Christianization but continues for a full three centuries, disappearing after the Norman conquest. A type of object unique to Christianized Anglo-Saxon England are the six known Anglo-Saxon runic rings of the 9th to 10th centuries.

== Continental ==
Apart from the earliest inscriptions found on the continent along the North Sea coast (the "North Germanic Koine", Martin 2004:173), continental inscriptions can be divided in those of the "Alemannic runic province" (Martin 2004), with a few dozen examples dating to the 6th and 7th centuries, and those associated with the Goths, loosely scattered along the Oder to south-eastern Poland, as far as the Carpathian Mountains (e.g. the ring of Pietroassa in Romania), dating to the 4th and 5th centuries. The cessation of both the Gothic and Alemannic runic tradition coincides with the Christianization of the respective peoples.

Lüthi (2004:321) identifies a total of about 81 continental inscriptions found south of the "North Germanic Koine". Most of these originate in southern Germany (Baden-Württemberg and Bavaria), with a single one found south of the Rhine (Bülach fibula, found in Bülach, Switzerland), and a handful from Eastern Europe (Poland, Romania, Ukraine).

A silver-plated copper disk, originally part of a sword-belt, found at Liebenau, Lower Saxony with an early 5th-century runic inscription (mostly illegible, interpreted as possibly reading rauzwih) is classed as the earliest South Germanic (German) inscription known by the RGA (vol. 6, p. 576); the location of Liebenau is close to the boundary of the North Sea and South Germanic zones.

=== Gothic ===
Out of about a dozen candidate inscriptions, only three are widely accepted to be of Gothic origin: the gold ring of Pietroassa, bearing a votive inscription, part of a larger treasure found in the Romanian Carpathians, and two spearheads inscribed with what is probably the weapon's name, one found in the Ukrainian Carpathians, and the other in eastern Germany, near the Oder.

The inscription on the spearhead of Kovel, found in Ukraine (now lost) is a special case. Its date is very early (3rd century) and it shows a mixture of runic and Latin letters, reading ⟨TᛁᛚᚨᚱᛁDᛊ⟩ or ⟨TIᛚᚨRIDS⟩ (the i, r and s letters being identical in the Elder Futhark and Latin scripts), and may thus reflect a stage of development before the runes became fixed as a separate script in its own right.

=== Alemannic ===
The known inscriptions from Alemannia mostly date to the century between AD 520 and 620. There are some 70 inscriptions in total, about half of them on fibulae. Some are explicitly dedications among lovers, containing leub "beloved", or in the case of the Bülach fibula fridil "lover". Most were found in Germany, in the states of Baden-Württemberg and Bavaria. A lesser number originates in Hessen and Rheinland-Pfalz, and outside of Germany there is a single example from Switzerland, and a small number of what are likely Burgundian inscriptions from eastern France.

The precise number of inscriptions is debatable, as some proposed inscriptions consist of a single sign, or a row of signs that may also be "rune-like", in imitation of writing, or purely ornamental. For example, a ring found in Bopfingen has been interpreted as being inscribed with a single g, i.e. a simple X-shape that may also be ornamental. Most interpretable inscriptions contain personal names, and only ten inscriptions contain more than one interpretable word. Of these, four translate to "(PN) wrote the runes".

The other six "long" interpretable inscriptions are:

- Pforzen buckle: aigil andi aïlrun / ltahu gasokun ("Aigil and Ailrun fought [at the Ilz River?]")
- Nordendorf I fibula: logaþorewodanwigiþonar (three theonyms, or "Wodan and Wigi-þonar are magicians/sorcerers")
- Schretzheim case: arogisd / alaguþleuba : dedun ("Arogast / Alaguth [and] Leubo (Beloved) made it")
- Schretzheim fibula: siþwagadin leubo ("to the Traveller (Wotan?), [from] Leubo (Beloved)", or perhaps "love to my travel-companion" or similar)
- Bad Ems fibula: madali umbada ("Madali, protection")
- Osthofen: god fura dih deofile ("God for/before you, devil/Theophilus". The inscription is one of the youngest of the Alemannic sphere, dating to between 660 and 690, and clearly reflects a Christianized background).

Other notable inscriptions:

- Bülach fibula: frifridil du aftm
- Wurmlingen spearhead, from an Alemannic grave in Wurmlingen, inscription read as a personal name (i)dorih (Ido-rīh or Dor-rīh)
- Schretzheim ring-sword: the sword blade has four runes arranged so that the staves form a cross. Read as arab by Düwel (1997). Schwab (1998:378) reads abra, interpreting it as abbreviating the magic word Abraxas, suggesting influence of the magic traditions of Late Antiquity, and the Christian practice of arranging monograms on the arms of a cross.
- Kleines Schulerloch inscription, of dubious authenticity and possibly a hoax. Considered an obvious falsification by Looijenga (2003: 223). Reads birg : leub : selbrade.

A small number of inscriptions found in eastern France may be Burgundian rather than Alemannic:

- the Arguel pebble (considered an obvious falsification by Looijenga): arbitag | wodan | luïgo[?h]aŋzej | kim |
- the Charnay Fibula: fuþarkgwhnijïpʀstbem | ' uþf[?]þai ' id | dan ' (l)iano | ïia | [?]r |

=== Frankish ===
Very few inscriptions can be associated with the Franks, reflecting their early Romanization and Christianization. An important find is the Bergakker inscription, suggested as recording 5th-century Old Frankish. The only other inscription definitely classified as Frankish is the Borgharen buckle, reading bobo (a Frankish personal name).

== See also ==
- List of runestones
