= Alemannic German =

Group of dialects of the Upper German branch of the Germanic language family

Alemannic
- Pronunciation: [alɛˈman(ː)ɪʃ]
- Native to: Liechtenstein, parts of Switzerland, parts of Austria, Germany, France, Italy, United States, Venezuela
- Native speakers: 7,162,000 (2004–2012)
- Language family: Indo-European: Germanic; West Germanic; Elbe Germanic; High German; Upper German; Alemannic
- Writing system: Latin, Historically Elder Futhark

Language codes
- ISO 639-2: gsw
- ISO 639-3: Variously: gct – Colonia Tovar gsw – Alsatian & Swiss German swg – Swabian wae – Walser
- Glottolog: alem1243
- IETF: gsw
- Blue indicates the traditional distribution area of Western Upper German (=Alemannic) dialects.

- Alemannic is classified as Vulnerable by the UNESCO Atlas of the World's Languages in Danger

Alemannic, or rarely Alemannish (Alemannisch, [alɛˈman(ː)ɪʃ]), is a group of High German dialects. The name derives from the ancient Germanic tribal confederation known as the Alemanni ("all men").

== Distribution ==
Alemannic is the term used for a group of High German dialects. The name derives from the ancient Germanic tribal confederation known as the Alemanni ("all men"). Alemannic dialects are spoken by approximately ten million people around the world.:

- In Europe:
  - Switzerland: all German-speaking parts of the country except Samnaun
  - Germany: centre and south of Baden-Württemberg, Swabia, and certain districts of Bavaria
  - Austria: Vorarlberg, Reutte District of Tyrol
  - Liechtenstein
  - France: Alsace region (Alsatian dialect) and in some villages of the Phalsbourg county, in Lorraine
  - Italy: Gressoney-La-Trinité, Gressoney-Saint-Jean, Issime, Alagna Valsesia, Rimella and Formazza, in some other villages almost extinct
- Outside Europe:
  - United States: Allen and Adams County, Indiana, by the Amish there and also in their daughter settlements in Indiana and other U.S. states.
  - Venezuela: Colonia Tovar (Colonia Tovar dialect)

== Status ==
Alemannic comprises a dialect continuum from the Highest Alemannic spoken in the mountainous south to Swabian in the relatively flat north and more of the characteristics of Standard German the farther north one goes.

In Germany and other European countries, the abstand and ausbau language framework is used to decide what is a language and what is a dialect. According to this framework, Alemannic varieties of German form a dialect continuum and are clearly dialects. Some linguists and organisations that differentiate between languages and dialects primarily on the grounds of mutual intelligibility, such as SIL International, UNESCO and Ethnologue describe Alemannic as an independent language from German. While ISO 639-2 does not distinguish between dialects, ISO 639-3 distinguishes four of them:

- gct – Colonia Tovar, a dialect spoken since 1843 in Venezuela,
- gsw – what ISO 639-2 only considers to be the Alemannic language, is recognised here as:
  - Alsatian, a dialect spoken in the eastern France region;
  - Swiss German, mainly spoken in Switzerland;
- swg – Swabian German, mainly spoken in the central-southeastern Baden-Wuerttemberg,
- wae – Walser German, mainly spoken in Swiss Upper Valais in the Alps.

Standard German is used in writing and in Germany orally in formal contexts throughout the Alemannic-speaking regions (with the exception of Alsace, where French or the Alsatian dialect of Alemannic is used instead).

== Variants ==
Alemannic in the broad sense comprises the following variants:

- Swabian (mostly in Swabia, in Germany, covering large parts of Württemberg and all of Bavarian Swabia). Unlike most other Alemannic dialects, it does not retain the Middle High German monophthongs û, î but shifts them to [ou], [ei] (as opposed to Standard German [aʊ], [aɪ]). For this reason, "Swabian" is also used in opposition to "Alemannic".
- Alemannic in the strict sense:
  - Low Alemannic dialects. Retain German initial /k/ as [kʰ] (or [kx]) rather than fricativising to [x] as in High Alemannic. Subvariants:
    - Upper-Rhine Alemannic in Southwestern Baden and its variant Alsatian (in Alsace, France)
    - Alemán Coloniero (in Venezuela)
    - Basel German (in Basel, Switzerland)
  - Lake Constance Alemannic (Bodenseealemannisch) (in Southern Württemberg, Southeastern Baden, Northwestern Vorarlberg), a transitional dialect, close to High Alemannic, with some Swabian features in the vowel system.
  - High Alemannic (mostly in Switzerland, parts of Vorarlberg, and in the southern parts of the Black Forest in Germany). Complete the High German consonant shift by fricativising initial /k/ to [x]. Subvariants:
    - Bernese German
    - Zurich German
    - Vorarlbergisch
    - Liechtensteinisch
  - Highest Alemannic (in the Canton of Valais, in the Walser settlements (e.g., in the canton of Grisons), in the Bernese Oberland and in the German-speaking part of Fribourg) does not have the hiatus diphthongisation of other dialects of German. For example: [ˈʃnei̯jə] ('to snow') instead of [ˈʃniː.ə(n)], [ˈb̥ou̯wə] ('to build') instead of [ˈb̥uː.ə(n)]. Subvariants:
    - Walliser German
    - Walser German

The Alemannic dialects of Switzerland are often called Swiss German or Schwiizerdütsch.

== Written Alemannic ==
The oldest known texts in Alemannic are brief Elder Futhark inscriptions dating to the sixth century (Bülach fibula, Pforzen buckle, Nordendorf fibula). In the Old High German period, the first coherent texts are recorded in the St. Gall Abbey, among them the eighth-century Paternoster:

Fater unser, thu bist in himile
uuihi namu dinan
qhueme rihhi di^{i}n
uuerde uuillo diin,
so in himile, sosa in erdu
prooth unseer emezzihic kip uns hiutu
oblaz uns sculdi unsero
so uuir oblazem uns skuldikem
enti ni unsih firleit in khorunka
uzzer losi unsih fona ubile

Due to the importance of the Carolingian abbeys of St. Gall and Reichenau Island, a considerable part of the Old High German corpus has Alemannic traits. Alemannic Middle High German is less prominent, in spite of the Codex Manesse compiled by Johannes Hadlaub of Zürich. The rise of the Old Swiss Confederacy from the fourteenth century led to the creation of Alemannic Swiss chronicles. Huldrych Zwingli's Bible translation of the 1520s (the 1531 Froschauer Bible) was in an Alemannic variant of Early Modern High German. From the seventeenth century, written Alemannic was displaced by Standard German, which emerged from sixteenth century Early Modern High German, in particular in the wake of Martin Luther's Bible translation of the 1520s. The 1665 revision of the Froschauer Bible removed the Alemannic elements, approaching the language used by Luther. For this reason, no binding orthographical standard for writing modern Alemannic emerged, and orthographies in use usually compromise between a precise phonological notation, and proximity to the familiar Standard German orthography (in particular for loanwords).

Johann Peter Hebel published his Allemannische Gedichte in 1803. Swiss authors often consciously employ Helvetisms within Standard German, notably Jeremias Gotthelf in his novels set in the Emmental, Friedrich Glauser in his crime stories, and more recently Tim Krohn in his Quatemberkinder.

The poet Ida Ospelt-Amann wrote published exclusively in the dialect of Vaduz.

== Characteristics ==
- The diminutive is used frequently in all Alemannic dialects. Northern and eastern dialects use the suffix -le; western varieties (e.g. northern Alsace) uses the suffix -el /l̩/; southern dialects use the suffix -li (Standard German suffix -lein or -chen). As in standard German, these suffixes cause umlaut. Depending on dialect, 'little house' may be Heisle, Hiisel, Hüüsle, Hüüsli or Hiisli (Standard German Häuslein or Häuschen). Some varieties have plural diminutives in -ler, -la or -lich.
- Northern variants of Alemannic (Swabian and Low Alemannic), like standard German, pronounce ch as a uvular or velar [χ] or [x] (Ach-Laut) after back vowels (a, o, u) and as a palatal [ç] consonant (Ich-Laut) elsewhere. High Alemannic, Lake Constance Alemannic and Highest Alemannic dialects exclusively use the Ach-Laut.
- In most Alemannic dialects, the past participle of the verb meaning to be (sein in standard German, with past participle gewesen) derives from a form akin to gesein (gsi, gsìnn, gsei etc.).
- Unlike standard German, Alemannic grammar knows only the present perfect as a form of past. The German phrase "Ich war in Bern" must be formed as "I bi z Bärn gsi", "Ich bin zu Bern gewesen" in standard German.

Some conjugated forms of the verb to be in Alemannic dialects
English (standard German)	Low Swabian	Alsatian Lower High Alsace	Allgäuerisch	Lower Markgräflerland	Upper Swabian	Eastern Swiss German	Western Swiss German	Sensler
I am (ich bin)	I ben	Ìch bì	I bi	Ich bi	I bee	I bi	I(g) bi [ɪɡ̊ b̥ɪ]	I bü/bi
thou art (du bist)	du bisch	dü bìsch	du bisch	du bisch	d(o)u bisch	du bisch	du bisch [d̥ʊ b̥ɪʒ̊]	du büsch/bisch
he is (er ist)	er isch	är ìsch	är isch	är isch	är isch	är isch	är isch [æɾ ɪʒ̊]	är isch
she is (sie ist)	sia isch	sa ìsch	sia isch	sie isch	si isch	si isch	si isch [sɪ ɪʒ̊]	sia isch
it is (es ist)	es isch	äs ìsch	as isch	as isch	äs isch	äs isch	äs isch [æz̊ (əʒ̊) ɪʒ̊]	as isch
we are (wir sind)	mr sen(d)	mìr sìn	mir send/sönd	mir sin	mr send	m(i)r send/sön/sinn	mir sy [mɪɾ si]	wier sy
ye are (ihr seid)	ihr sen(d)	ìhr sìn	ihr send	ihr sin	ihr send	i(i)r sönd/sind	dir syt [d̥ɪɾ sit]	ier syt
you are (Sie sind)	Se sen(d)	Sa sìn	Dia send	Si sin	Dia send	Si sind/sönd	Si sy [sɪ si]	Si sy
they are (sie sind)	se sen(d)	sa sìn	dia send	si sin	dia send	si sind/sönd	si sy [sɪ si]	si sy
I have been (ich bin ... gewesen)	i ben gwäa	ìch bì gsìì	i bi gsi	ich bi gsi	i bee gsei	i bi gsi	i bi gsy [ɪ(ɡ̊) b̥ɪ ksiː]	i bü/bi gsy

== See also ==
- Alemannic separatism
- German dialects
- Muettersproch-Gsellschaft

== Sources ==
- Phaf-Rheinberger, Ineke (2021-01-12). Ricardo Porros Architektur in Vaduz und Havanna (in German). Books on Demand. ISBN 978-3-7526-8278-6.
