= Libuin =

Libuin, Lebwin, Leubwin (Latinized Libuinus, Lebuinus) is a Germanic name, from leub- "dear, beloved" and win- "friend".

- Leubwini mentioned on the Nordendorf fibula (6th century). This may either be a personal name, or the literal address of a "dearly beloved friend".
- Lebuinus (8th century), apostle of the Frisians
- Libuinus Subdiaconus is the author of a Vita of Pope Leo IX, compiled on the event of the pope's death in 1054, whence it is also known as De Obitus Leonis.
