= Bülach fibula =

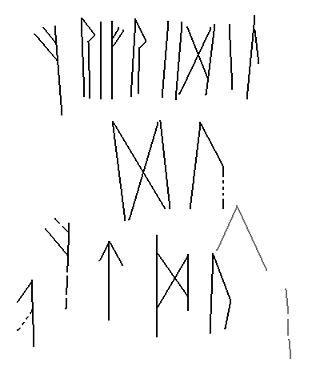
Rendition of the runic inscription from the Bülach fibula. (cf. Martin, 1997)

The Bülach fibula is a silver disk-type fibula with almandine inlay found in Bülach, Canton Zürich in 1927. The Alemannic grave in which it was found (no. 249) dates to the 6th century and contained the remains of an adult woman.

The fibula, dated by most recent commentators to the latter half of the 6th or early 7th century, bears an Elder Futhark runic inscription, the only one found in Switzerland to date. A 1927 photograph of the grave shows that the fibula, along with an iron ring and two small beads, was worn by the deceased as an amulet or talisman.

== Inscription ==
The inscription begins

ᚠᚱᛁᚠᚱᛁᛞᛁᛚ ᛞᚢ ᚨᚠᛏᛗ
frifridil du aftm[...

with the first and the third f runes as well as the a rune mirrored.

Frifridil is an endearing name for a male friend or lover (OHG fridil, MHG friedel). du is the second person singular pronoun, already differentiated from the common West Germanic þu, lending the inscription an early Old High German or Alemannic German character.

The remaining part of the inscription is read differently by various authors. Also, the mirrored runes have suggested change of reading direction to some. Krause and Jankuhn (1966) read

fri[d]fridil du fat mik l l

with only two l runes, translating "you, my lover, embrace me, leek! leek!", interpreting the l runes as abbreviating "leek" (*laukaz), symbolizing fertility or prosperity (leek is strongly associated with nubile women in Old Norse skaldic poetry).

Klingenberg (1976) has

frifridil [lid] du [fud] f[a]t[o] mik. (l)[au]k (l)[i]d l l

reading the first lid as implied by mirroring the dil and the fud as implied by mirroring the du f in conscious obscuring of the obscene content, lid meaning "penis" and fud meaning "vulva", and interpreting the l runes as phallic symbols, again abbreviating lid, resulting in a translation of "[I, your] lover with the penis, you with the vulva: receive me; leek! penis! leek! penis!"

Opitz (1977) similarly has

fri[d]fridil [lid] du [fud] f[a]t[.] mik (l[id]) l[id] l[id]
"lover - penis; you - vulva; receive me; (penis) penis penis"

dismissing Klingenberg's k and d at the end of the inscription as conjectured.

Later interpreters have dismissed the "l runes" as mere accidental scratches, and the sexual reading of Klingenberg and Opitz as the product of an excited imagination. Looijenga (1997) reads a mere uninterpretable aftmu. The undisputed reading of frifridil however establishes the inscription as a dedication among lovers.

== See also ==
- Nordendorf fibulae
