= Fontain =

- Commune
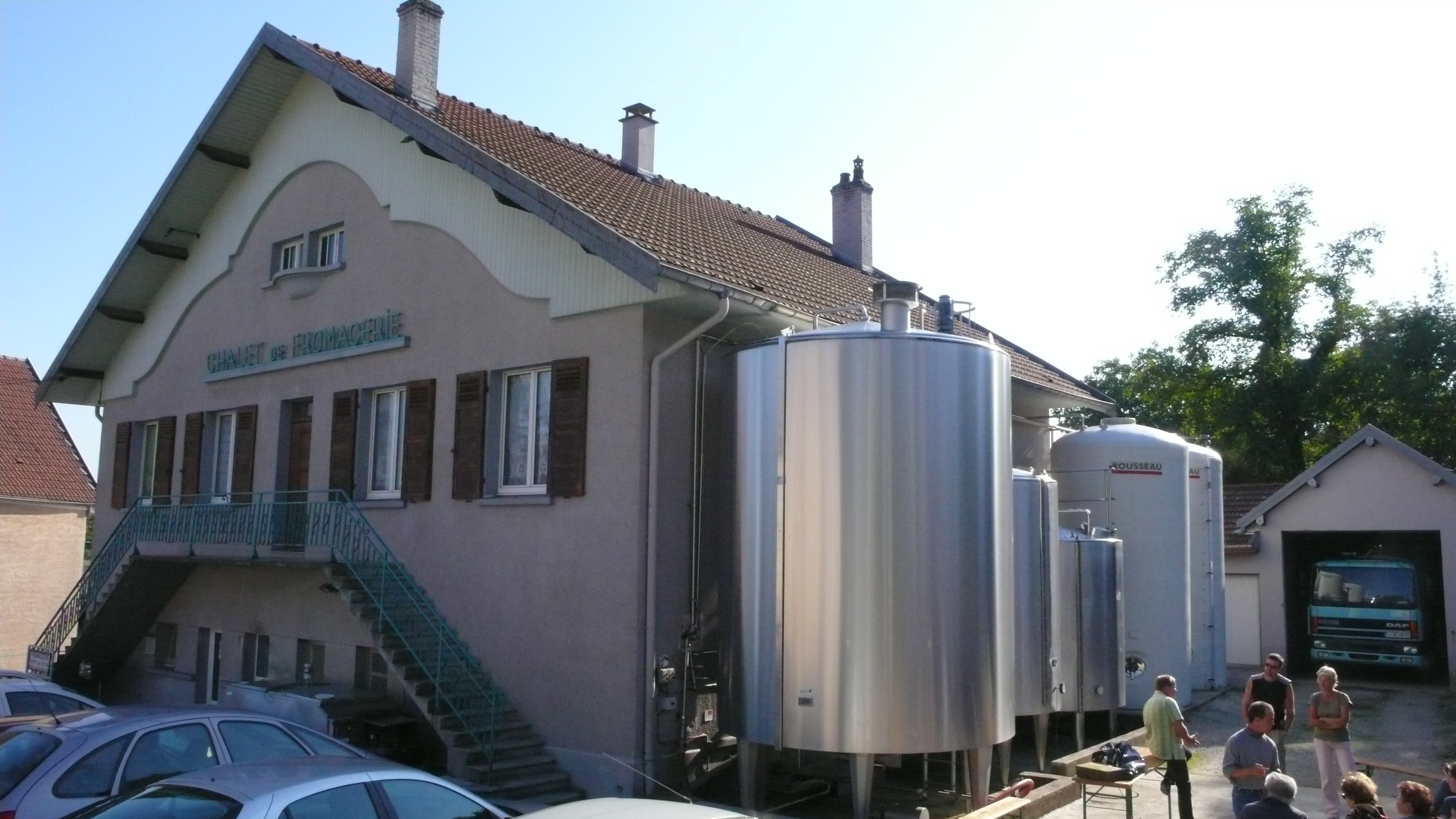
- Dairy

- Coat of arms
- Location of Fontain
- Location within France Location within Bourgogne-Franche-Comté
- Coordinates: 47°11′58″N 6°01′37″E
- Country: France
- Region: Bourgogne-Franche-Comté
- Department: Doubs
- Arrondissement: Besançon
- Canton: Besançon-5
- Intercommunality: Grand Besançon Métropole

Government
  - Mayor (2022–2026): Catherine Hamelin
- Area^{1}: 21.25 km^{2} (8.20 sq mi)
- Highest elevation: 511 m (1,677 ft)
- Lowest elevation: 310 m (1,020 ft)
- Population (2023): 1,207
  - Density: 56.80/km^{2} (147.1/sq mi)
- Time zone: UTC+01:00 (CET)
  - Summer (DST): UTC+02:00 (CEST)
- INSEE/Postal code: 25245 /25660
- ^{1} French Land Register data, which excludes lakes, ponds, glaciers > 1 km^{2} (0.386 sq mi or 247 acres) and river estuaries.

Fontain (French pronunciation: [fɔ̃tɛ̃]) is a commune in the Doubs department in the Bourgogne-Franche-Comté region in eastern France. On 1 January 2019, the former commune Arguel was merged into Fontain.

== Population ==
Population data refer to the area corresponding with the commune as of January 2025.

Historical population
| Year | Pop. | ±% p.a. |
|---|---|---|
| 1968 | 434 | — |
| 1975 | 650 | +5.94% |
| 1982 | 882 | +4.46% |
| 1990 | 961 | +1.08% |
| 1999 | 1,010 | +0.55% |
| 2007 | 1,186 | +2.03% |
| 2012 | 1,237 | +0.85% |
| 2017 | 1,301 | +1.01% |
| 2023 | 1,207 | −1.24% |
Source: INSEE

== See also ==
- Communes of the Doubs department
