= Arguel inscription =

Elder Futhark inscription of uncertain authenticity

The Arguel inscription (French: L'inscription (runique) d'Arguel) is an Elder Futhark inscription of uncertain authenticity, dated to the 5th or 6th century. It was claimed to have been discovered by a student of law, Robert Milliat, next to a spring at the foot of a cliff at Arguel in the French Doubs department, just south of Besançon. It was first presented at the Rhodania archaeological congress of 1921.

== Description ==
The stone is a piece of chalk, measuring 6 cm in length, weighing 75 grams, bearing an inscription in four lines on one side, plus a single line on the reverse side, reading

ᚨᚱᛒᛁᛏᚨ? / ᚹᛟᛞᚨᚾ / ᛚ???ᛟ?ᚺᚨᛜ / ?ᛖ? / ᚲᛁᛗ
arbita? / wodan / l???o?haŋ / ?e? // kim

in Michel's 1921 drawing and transcription rendered as:

ᚨᚱᛒᛁᛏᚨᚾ / ᚹᛟᛞᚨᚾ / ᛚᚢᚢᚷᛟᚹᚺᚨᛜ / ᛉᛖᛋ / ᚲᛁᛗ
arbitan / wodan / luugowhaŋ / res // kim

== Readings ==
The precise reading is uncertain. The first line has been read as either arbitan, arbitah or arbitam. Michel's luugowhaŋ has also been read as liuhophang or luihophang. The res has also been read as rei or rej, r transcribing a ᛉ (z) rune, while the s in Michel's drawing has the shape of the later Younger Futhark ᛋ rune.

The inscription has no generally accepted translation, but all scholars who have commented agree that the second line is an attestation of the theonym Wodan.

Suggestions for readings and translations include:

- Arbitan Wodan luug ow hangr eikim, meaning either "Arbitan, Wodan, has closed the battlefield with spears" or "Wodan has hidden Arbitan on the hill of oaks" (M. Perennot 1922)
- arbitah Wodan liuhophang rej kim "seize the heritage, Wodan; take the light from the mighty" (J.-A. Bizet)
- arbi tah Wodan luihop hang reikim, interpreted as a defixio or curse of a dispossessed heir (G. Bizet, 1964); Bizet further identifies the inscriptions as East Germanic, confirming the probably association with the Burgundians.

Looijenga (2003) states that in her opinion the inscription is a falsification.

== See also ==
- List of runestones
