= Muettersproch-Gsellschaft =

Society

Coordinates: 47°59′14″N 7°52′34″E

The Muettersproch-Gsellschaft (MSG; lit. 'Mother Tongue Society') is a society established in 1967 whose goal it is to preserve and foster the Alemannic dialects. It currently has over 3,500 members from all Alemannic speaking areas, i.e. Alsace, Switzerland and Vorarlberg, but especially from South Baden. There are also members from all over Europe and the Americas. Most Alemannic authors, poets and singer-songwriters in South Baden are members of the society.

== Organization ==
=== Membership ===
The society was founded in 1966 in Freiburg im Breisgau. It has over 2,700 members, the vast majority of whom are German-Alemannic bilinguals from the region covered by the former state of South Baden. They engage in exchanging their cultural heritage with the other Alemannic-speaking regions in Alsace, Switzerland, Liechtenstein, Vorarlberg and Colonia Tovar. With time, some Alemanni (German: Alemannen) dispersed across Europe and overseas and many of these are also members of the Muettersproch-Gsellschaft. The membership further comprises many Alemannic authors and songwriters.

Society's membership grew and is now declining:

- in the year 1975: 350 members
- in the year 1977: 1,000 members
- in the year 1978: 1,500 members
- in the year 1979: 2,000 members
- in the year 2000: 3,700 members
- in the year 2017: 2,700 members
- in the year 2018: 2,443 members
- in the year 2019: 2,375 members

=== Past presidents ===
- Karl Asal, Freiburg: 1965-1967. Gründung des Vereins mit 116 Gündungsmitgliedern.
- Walter Füsslin, Freiburg im Breisgau: 1967–1972
- Klaus Poppen, Freiburg im Breisgau: 1972–2002
- Walter Möll, Singen: 2002–2007
- Franz-Josef Winterhalter, Oberried: 2007–present

=== Regional groups ===
Since November 2010, the society's head office is located in Freiburg im Breisgau, which is complemented by 16 regional groups across southern Baden and one group of Alemanni in the world. Regional groups organise a number of different events, such as public readings, lectures, street stalls and festivals. Membership in regional groups is automatic for all members who live within its catchment area; members outside any of these catchment areas can either ask to affiliate with a group they feel connected to or remain without such an affiliation. Regional groups make contact with the Alemannic language groups in Alsace, Switzerland, Liechtenstein und Vorarlberg by excursions as well as invitations of Alemannic poets and troubadours.

=== Members meeting ===
Members meeting is held every year in another city. The official agenda concentrates on account, report of activities and acceptance of the accounts. If necessary, an election of a new board is held, then follow proposals and prospects. Cultural activities are additional to the official part.

== Core activities ==
The Muettersproch-Gsellschaft today are involved with several activities which serve to increase awareness of the organisation while simultaneously rewarding people who support the dialect. Their operations actively work to promote the dialect and to educate people who might otherwise view Alemannic in a pejorative light. They also seek to demonstrate that the dialect has purpose and value for those who can claim it as part of their heritage. Klaus Poppen, president of the MSG from 1972 through to 2002, has had significant influence over the way the society is and operates today. Among their core activities are the following:

- The society has published several anthologies of poetry.
- They produce the popular sticker "Bi uns cha me au alemannisch schwätze" (engl. Here you can speak Alemannic too).
- In 1982 they collected 37,000 signatures in a campaign for increased use of the dialect in radio and television broadcasts.
- The Muettersproch-Gsellschaft regularly organises competitions, such as the lyrics and prose competition "Mir sueche die Beschte" (engl. We are looking for the best) in 2004, which they had organised in coordination with the newspaper Badische Zeitung and the public broadcaster Südwestrundfunk.
- They organise seminars on poetry composition, public speaking and other topics in which their members can gain new knowledge and skills in their dialect.
- They publish the magazine Alemannisch dunkt üs guet bi-annually, which is sent out to all members and also partially available from their website.
- The Muettersproch-Gsellschaft awards the prize Alemannen-Antenne in irregular intervals, which recognises individuals from radio and television who have shown commitment to the Alemannic dialect.

=== Alemannic authors and songwriters ===
About 100 authors of alemannic tongue are part of the Muettersproch-Gsellschaft. Songwriters in the Alemannic language are members as well. The societies Muettersproch-Gsellschaft and Landesverein Badische Heimat published an Alemannic dictionary (Alemannisches Wörterbuch) and a songbook (Alemannisches Liederbuch).

=== Semiannual Journal ===
Twice a year, the society's journal Alemannisch dunkt üs guet (We feel good speaking in Alemannic) with a circulation of 3,000 copies is issued in the Alemannic language to provide information to members and give them platform for their own work. More than 100 volumes have been issued since 1967. Popular themes are: Us de Gruppe (Groups report) and Des un sell (Mishmash). Further topics are: new members, tourist highlights, and Alemannic books and CDs. Congratulations and obituary notices are also included.

=== Internet and new media ===
The society's web site gives further details on the nearest regional chapter, the old issues of journal Alemannisch dunkt üs guet and what is happening in the Alemannic cultural scene. There are also a variety of alemannic poems from more than 100 authors. On the subpage "Writers and Musicians" (Dichte und musiziere) are curriculum vitae, publications, honour degrees and examples of works from Alemannic music groups and authors. Alemannic writers and artists have the opportunity to get to know their new books, CDs and others on the website.

On YouTube an archive with portraits of Alemannic writers is being installed. A Facebook site reports Alemannic news.

=== Questions and answers ===
Questions concerning Alemannic language and their idioms come from cultural and scientific institutions and members of the society. The will be clarified and discussed by the board.

=== Muettersproch-Gsellschaft as publisher ===
For a faster understanding and acceptance of the alemannic language a dictionary (Alemannisches Wörterbuch), a songbook (Alemannische Liederbuch) and the pocket song book (Alemannisches Taschenliederbuch) were published.

=== Library ===
The library contains 900 books in Alemannic language, mainly from the Baden region. Further books by authors from Switzerland, Alsace and Vorarlberg are likewise collected. More than half of the books in the collection had been sent to Muettersproch-Gsellschaft for review in the journal.

=== Dialect at school (Mundart in der Schule) ===
The society's goal is to get school children in Baden-Württemberg accustomed to the regional dialects Fränkisch, Schwäbisch and Alemannic. School classes and project groups can invite one of about 60 authors and songwriters to present their wisdom of idioms and dialects in lessons of two hours. An inventory of each artists capabilities is contained in the pamphlet Mundart in der Schule. In this way different forms and rhythms of dialect can be put in perspective as varieties of the German language. Organisation of these contacts is done by Muettersproch-Gsellschaft e. V., coorganiser is the society „schwäbische mund.art“ e. V. in Herrenberg.

=== Medal in honour of Johann-Peter-Hebel ===
Since 1991, the regional chapter "Hegau" (the largest Muettersproch-Gsellschaft chapter with 600 members) awards someone with the "Johann-Peter-Hebel-Medaille" medal to express appreciation for engagement in the Alemannic language.

== Future activities ==
In addition to the sessions of the regional groups special working groups will develop proposals concentrating on alemannic poets, theatre and new media. Events in the alemannic language region will be organized for a selection of different cities.

== Problems faced by the Muettersproch-Gsellschaft ==
=== Use of Alemannic as a Political Instrument ===
In connection with the so-called "Dialect Wave" of the 70s and its connection to the anti-nuclear movement in Wyhl, it came to a split in the position of the MSG's membership. The society's board argued vehemently against political instrumentalisation of the dialect, while activists in the movement sought to actively strengthen both their association with the local people and their assertion of local rights through prominent use of the regional dialect.

=== Generational Change ===
There is ongoing concern among the membership and board of the society regarding the future of both the society and the Alemannic dialects. While it is an express goal of the society to preserve the dialects, Alemannic suffers from an acutely ageing speaker population as the language is frequently not passed on to the younger generation or its maintenance neglected by young speakers, leading to generational language loss. This is also the principal reason the UNESCO Atlas of the World's Languages in Danger currently categorises Alemannic as vulnerable despite speaker estimates ranging in the millions.

The society is thus faced with the problem of encouraging parents to pass on the language as well as keeping young people engaged and interested in the language. The society has so far attempted to effect this through a variety of measures ranging from competitions for the youth to the use of rock music. They are also regularly organising in-school sessions, in which active members from the society (mainly authors and poets) design a short curriculum on Alemannic language and culture which they then teach over two lessons. The society has thus far perceived this program as greatly successful. The MSG also makes itself available as a platform to the younger generation through which they can present their own projects relating to Alemannic language and culture.

== Literature ==
- Alemannisch dunkt üs guet, Issues I/II 2002 – About the history of the society.
- Muettersproch-Gsellschaft (Hrsg.): Welewäg selleweg. An anthology with texts of 33 authors of dialect poetry from the region of Baden in Germany. Gutach 1996.
- Muettersproch-Gsellschaft (Hrsg.): Kumm sing mit! Alemannisches Liederbüechli. (Alemannic dialect songs, text only, without melody). 2016.
