= Kleines Schulerloch inscription =

Coordinates: 48°55′40″N 11°49′01″E

The inscription in Kleines Schulerloch cave
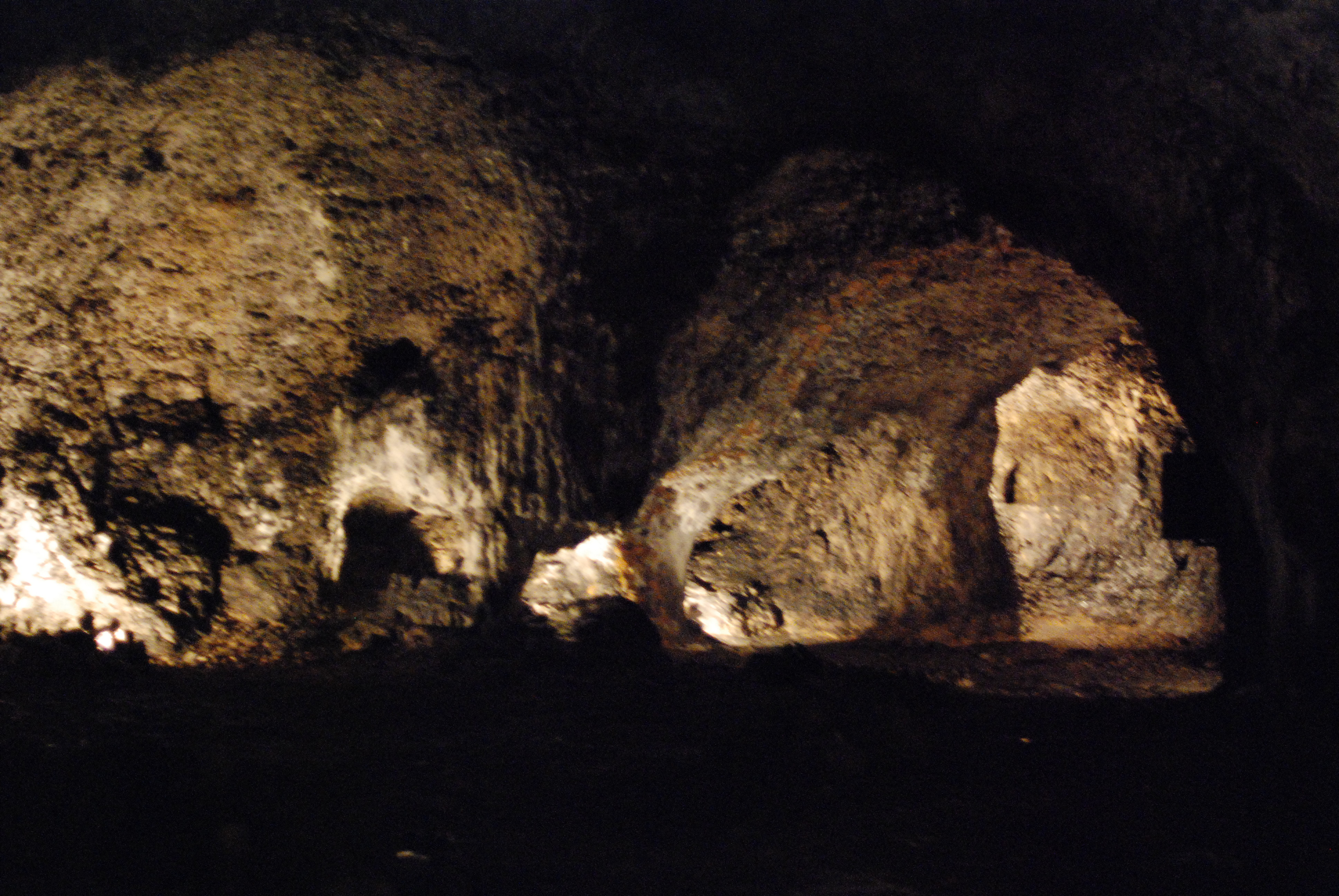
- Type: Runic inscription
- Discovered: 1937; Kleines Schulerloch cave, Altmühl valley, Kelheim, Lower Bavaria, Bavaria, Germany
- Classification: Possible falsification
- Culture: Viking Age

The Kleines Schulerloch inscription is a runic inscription of debated authenticity discovered in 1937 in the Kleines Schulerloch cave in the Altmühl valley (near Essing, Bavaria). It was brought to the attention of scholarship in 1952. If authentic, it dates to the period AD 535–675. It reads

birg : leub : selbrade,

probably meaning "Birg, beloved of Selbrad", next to a drawing of an ibex or stag scratched into the stone from perhaps the same time, but whose the authenticity is also debated. The inscription was generally considered to be fake shortly after its discovery.

The discovery of a parallel inscription in grave 172 of the Unterer Stollen cemetery in Bad Krozingen in 2001, reading

boba : leub | agirike

revived discussions regarding the authenticity of the Kleines Schulerloch inscription. Still, in 2003, Looijenga concluded that the inscription is an obvious falsification. In 2012, Findell, accepting the Bad Krozingen inscription as genuine, noted that most scholars still objected to its authenticity and considered the Kleines Schulerloch inscription to be at least "suspect". In a recent analysis, Philipp Simon concludes, "I tentatively suggest that the state of evidence indicates that the Kleines Schulerloch monument is indeed an authentic runic residue from the Early Mediaeval Period." He considers the strongest argument against authenticity to be that it is the only known south Germanic runic inscription on stone.
