= Arguel, Doubs =

Arguel
- Part of Fontain
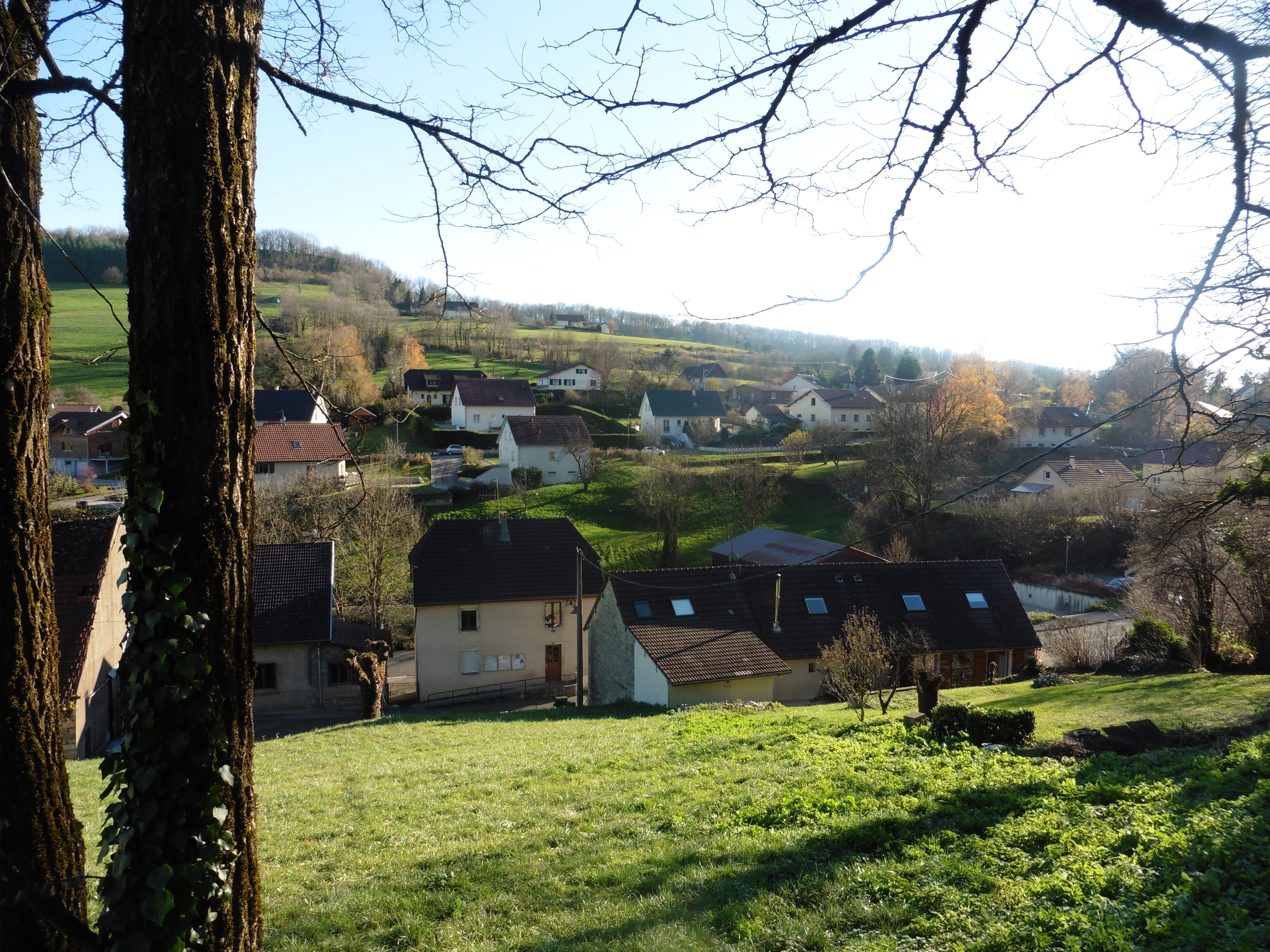
- A general view of Arguel
- Location of Arguel
- Location within France Location within Bourgogne-Franche-Comté
- Coordinates: 47°11′54″N 6°00′09″E
- Country: France
- Region: Bourgogne-Franche-Comté
- Department: Doubs
- Arrondissement: Besançon
- Canton: Besançon-6
- Commune: Fontain
- Area^{1}: 4.98 km^{2} (1.92 sq mi)
- Highest elevation: 507 m (1,663 ft)
- Lowest elevation: 300 m (980 ft)
- Population (2016): 273
  - Density: 54.8/km^{2} (142/sq mi)
- Time zone: UTC+01:00 (CET)
  - Summer (DST): UTC+02:00 (CEST)
- Postal code: 25720
- ^{1} French Land Register data, which excludes lakes, ponds, glaciers > 1 km^{2} (0.386 sq mi or 247 acres) and river estuaries.

Arguel (French pronunciation: [aʁɡɥɛl]) is a former commune in the Doubs department in the Bourgogne-Franche-Comté region in eastern France. On 1 January 2019, it was merged into the commune Fontain.

On a nearby cliff, the Arguel inscription was found here.

== See also ==
- Communes of the Doubs department
