= Øvre Stabu spearhead =

Runic inscription in Norway

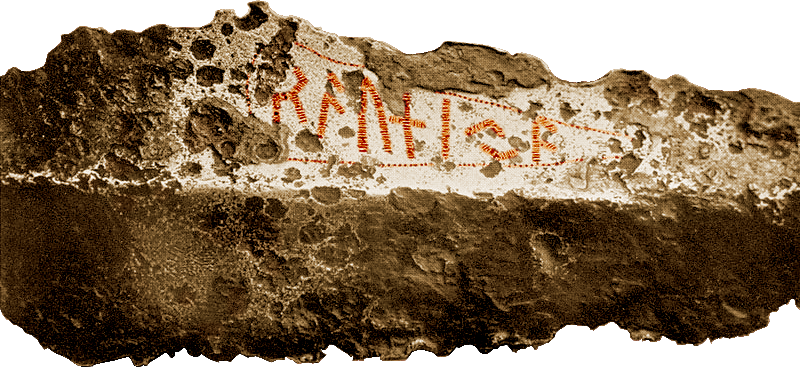
Colorized to enhance inscription

The Øvre Stabu spearhead is an iron spearhead which bears an Elder Futhark inscription dated to either the second half of the 2nd century AD or 210–240 AD, making it one of the oldest runic inscriptions preserved. It was discovered on the Øvre Stabu farm in Østre Toten Municipality in Innlandet county, Norway, in one of two graves, alongside other grave goods. The spearhead is of the Vennolum type (a term for a type of lancehead typical of the period, of which about 300 specimens are known) and has a length of 28 centimetres (11 in). The runes are incised using a 'zig-zag' technique, and are partly lost due to corrosion.

ᚱᚨᚢᚾᛁᛃᚨᛉ
raunijaz

The inscription is presumably recording the name of the spear. The name is interpreted as the Common Germanic (Proto-Norse) form of Old Norse reynir, meaning "tester". Compare the Gothic inscriptions on the spearhead of Kovel ᛏᛁᛚᚨᚱᛁᛞᛊ (tilarids, "thither-rider") and the spearhead of Dahmsdorf-Müncheberg ᚱᚨᚾᛃᚨ (ranja, "router").

== See also ==
- Migration Period spear
