= Thamudic B =

Central Semitic language

- Region: Northwest Arabia, occasionally Syria, Egypt, or Yemen
- Era: Mid- to late-1st millennium BCE
- Language family: Afroasiatic: Semitic; West Semitic; Central Semitic; North Arabian; Ancient North Arabian; Thamudic; Thamudic B

Language codes
- ISO 639-3: –

Thamudic B is a Central Semitic language and script concentrated in northwestern Arabia, with attestations in Syria, Egypt, and Yemen. As a poorly understood form of Ancient North Arabian, it is included in the Thamudic category. Mentions of the king of Babylon and the Nabataean god Dushara show that Thamudic B was written over a span of centuries, ranging at least from the seventh or sixth to fourth centuries BCE.

== Characteristics ==
Thamudic B is mostly written horizontally, from right to left. Salient linguistic features include the following:

1. The suffix morpheme of the prefix conjugation in the first person is -t, as in Arabic and Northwest Semitic, as opposed to the -k of Ancient South Arabian and the Ethiosemitic languages.
2. The dative preposition is nm, which appears to be an assimilated form of an original *lima.
3. The consonant /n/ often assimilates to a following contiguous consonant, ʔṯt, from earlier *ʾVnṯat and ʔt, from earlier *[ʔanta].
4. Imperatives are often augmented by the energic suffix -n.
