= Gothic runic inscriptions =

Elder Futhark writings

Very few Elder Futhark inscriptions in the Gothic language have been found in the territory historically settled by the Goths (Wielbark culture, Chernyakhov culture). Due to the early Christianization of the Goths, the Gothic alphabet replaced runes by the mid-4th century.

There are about a dozen candidate inscriptions, and only three of them are widely accepted to be of Gothic origin: the gold ring of Pietroassa, bearing a votive inscription, part of a larger treasure found in the Romanian Carpathians, and two spearheads inscribed with what is probably the weapon's name, one found in the Ukrainian Carpathians, and the other in eastern Germany, near the Oder.

== Ring of Pietroassa ==
A gold ring (necklace) was found in 1837 in Pietroassa (recte Pietroasele, south-east Romania, Buzău County), dated to ca. AD 400, bearing an Elder Futhark inscription of 15 runes. The ring was stolen in 1875, and clipped in two with pliers by a Bucharest goldsmith. It was recovered, but the 7th rune is now destroyed. The inscription reads:

ᚷᚢᛏᚨᚾᛁ [?] ᚹᛁ ᚺᚨᛁᛚᚨᚷ gutani [?] wi hailag

In pre-1875 drawings and descriptions the missing rune was read as othala (ᛟ), giving ᚷᚢᛏᚨᚾᛁᛟᚹᛁ ᚺᚨᛁᛚᚨᚷ (gutaniowi hailag). This was interpreted in various ways:

- gutanio wi hailag "sacred to the gothic women";
- gutan-iowi hailag "sacred to the Jove of the Goths" with Jove interpreted as Thunraz;
- gutani o[thala] wi hailag "sacred inheritance of the Goths" (gutani is the genitive plural, for Ulfilan 𐌲𐌿𐍄𐌰𐌽𐌴 (gutane)).

The identity of the 7th rune as othala had been called into question until a photograph, taken for London's Arundel Society before the ring was vandalised, was republished, showing clearly that othala is correct. How to interpret gutanio remains a matter of some dispute among runologists, however.

== Spearhead of Kovel ==
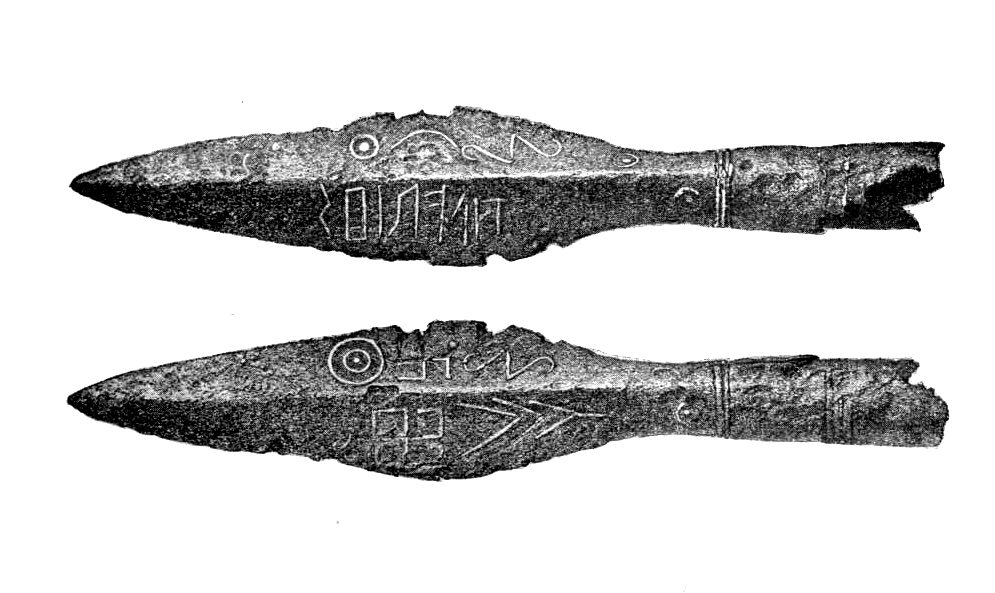
The spearhead of Kovel

The head of a lance, found in 1858 Suszyczno, 30 km from Kovel, Ukraine, dated to the early 3rd century.

The spearhead measures 15.5 cm with a maximal width of 3.0 cm. Both sides of the leaf were inlaid with silver symbols. The inscription notably runs right to left, reading tilarids, interpreted as "thither rider" or, more likely, Ziel-Reiter ("target rider" in modern German), the name either of a warrior, or of the spear itself. It is identified as East Germanic (Gothic) because of the nominative -s (in contrast to Proto-Norse -z). The t and d are closer to the Latin alphabet than to the classical Elder Futhark, as it were <TᛁᛚᚨᚱᛁDᛊ>.

An 1880 casting of the spearhead is exhibited in Berlin, an 1884 casting in Warsaw. The original was looted by Nazi archaeologists from its Polish owner in 1939 and it was lost altogether at the end of World War II.

== Spearhead of Dahmsdorf-Müncheberg ==
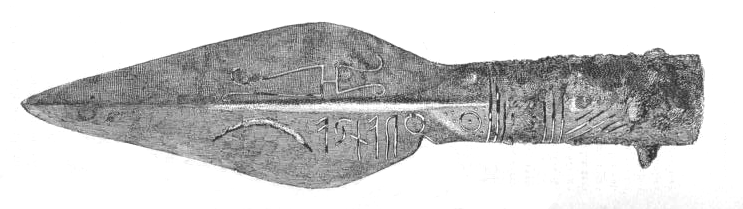
The spearhead of Dahmsdorf-Müncheberg

The head of a lance, found in 1865 in Dahmsdorf-Müncheberg, in Brandenburg between Berlin and the Oder River, inscribed with ᚱᚨᚾᛃᚨ (ranja) (Ulfilan 𐍂𐌰𐌽𐌽𐌾𐌰 [rannja], “router”).

== Spindle whorl of Letcani ==
Spindle whorl found in 1969 in Lețcani, Romania, dated to the 4th century.

ᚨᛞᛟᚾᛊᚢᚠᚺᛖ ᛬ᚱᚨᛜᛟ᛬ adonsufhe :rango:

== Buckle of Szabadbattyán ==
Silver buckle found before 1927 in Szabadbattyán, Hungary, dated to the early 5th century, perhaps referring to the "Mærings" or Ostrogoths.

ᛗᚨᚱᛁᛜᛊ mariŋs

== See also ==
- List of runestones
