= Nordendorf fibulae =

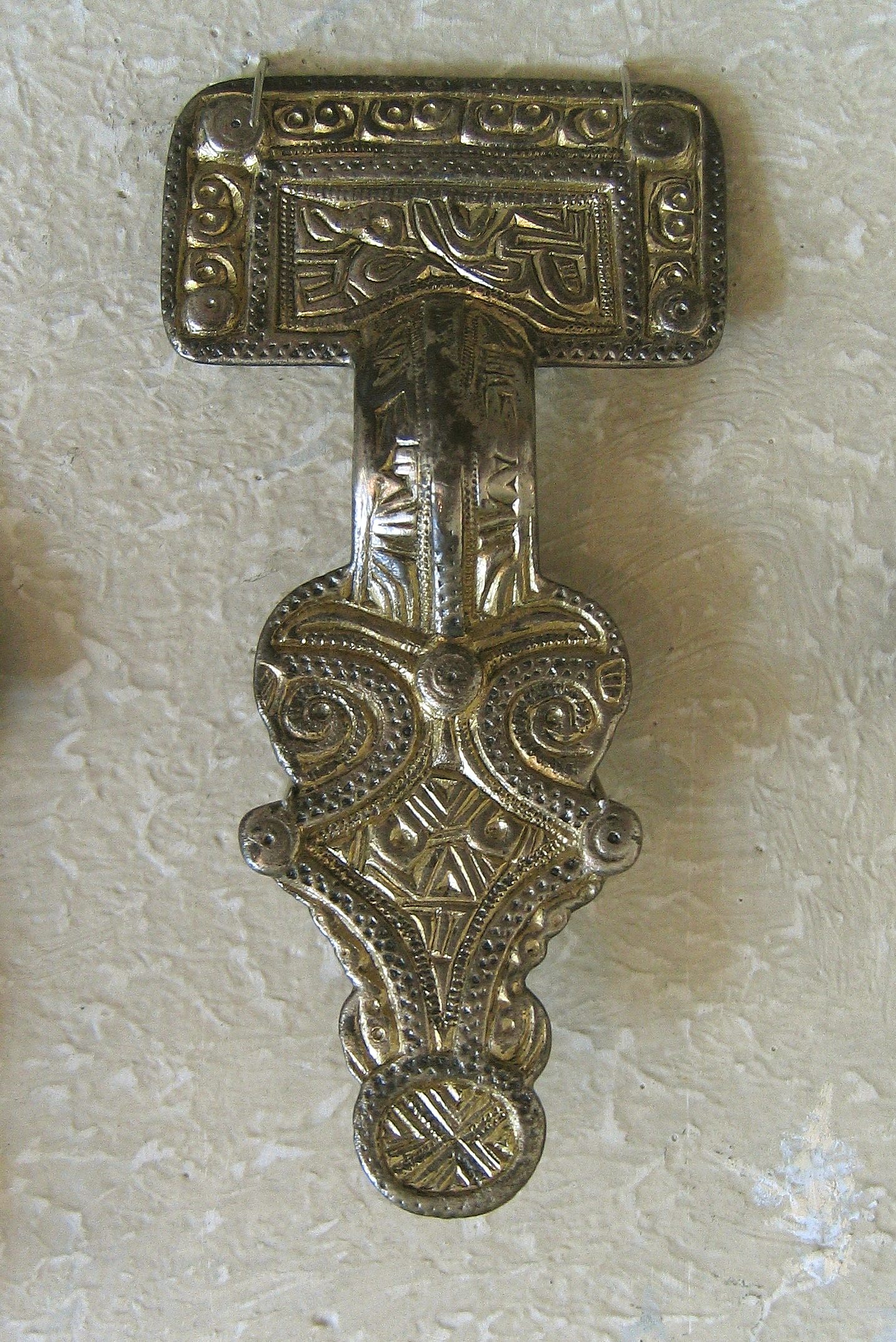
The front side of Nordendorf I fibula

The Nordendorf fibulae are two mid 6th to early 7th century Alamannic fibulae found in Nordendorf near Augsburg, Bavaria, Germany.

Both fibulae are from the same grave, a woman's grave from an Alemannic cemetery of 448 row graves. They are labelled I and II, and were found in 1843 and 1844, respectively. Both fibulae bear Elder Futhark runic inscriptions. The first inscription is longer, and especially famous because of the explicit mention of theonyms of the South Germanic pantheon; Düwel (1982) calls it the "most important runic document of the continent".

The settlement to which the cemetery was attached was situated right on the important Via Claudia Augusta and presumably owed its wealth to trade.

== Nordendorf I ==
The first fibula bears the following Elder Futhark inscription containing the names of Wodan and Þonar.

The inscription is in two parts:

I: awa leubwini
II: logaþore / wodan / wigiþonar

Part (I) is written in a single line, across most of the width of the fibula; part (II) is arranged upside-down with respect to part (I), in three lines crowded to one side of the fibula, with one word per line.

The sequence awa leubwini is a woman's name, Awa, and a man's name Leubwini (literally meaning "dear friend").

The second part, apparently added to the conventional dedication, is an exceptional testimony of continental Germanic paganism. The explicit mention of theonyms is extremely rare in all of the runic corpus, including the later Younger Futhark Scandinavian tradition.

The prefix wigi- before the name of Þonar is interpreted either as from *wīgian "to hallow" or as from *wīgan "to fight" (so the thunder god is called either "holy Þonar" or "battle Þonar"). Norbert Wagner argues that "battle Þonar" is the most likely given that a form wiggi- 'battle' is known in Old High German.

It would seem plausible for logaþore to be the name of another god, yielding a divine triad, but there is no obvious identification in surviving sources regarding Germanic paganism as we know it. Both Lóðurr and Loki have been proposed but the etymological reasoning is tenuous. Wagner argues that logaþore means "for the one who dares tell a lie" and compares the behaviour of Loki in Lokasenna.

Klaus Düwel interpreted logaþore as "magician, sorcerer", and translates "Wodan and Donar are magicians/sorcerers", which could indicate an early Christian protective charm against the old gods. On the other hand, the inscription may be an invocation of the gods' beneficial or healing power by an adherent of the old faith. With the fibula's date falling precisely in the period of gradual Christianization of the Alamanni (the bishopric of Konstanz was established around AD 600), a Christian interpretation has been supported by some scholars.

== Nordendorf II ==
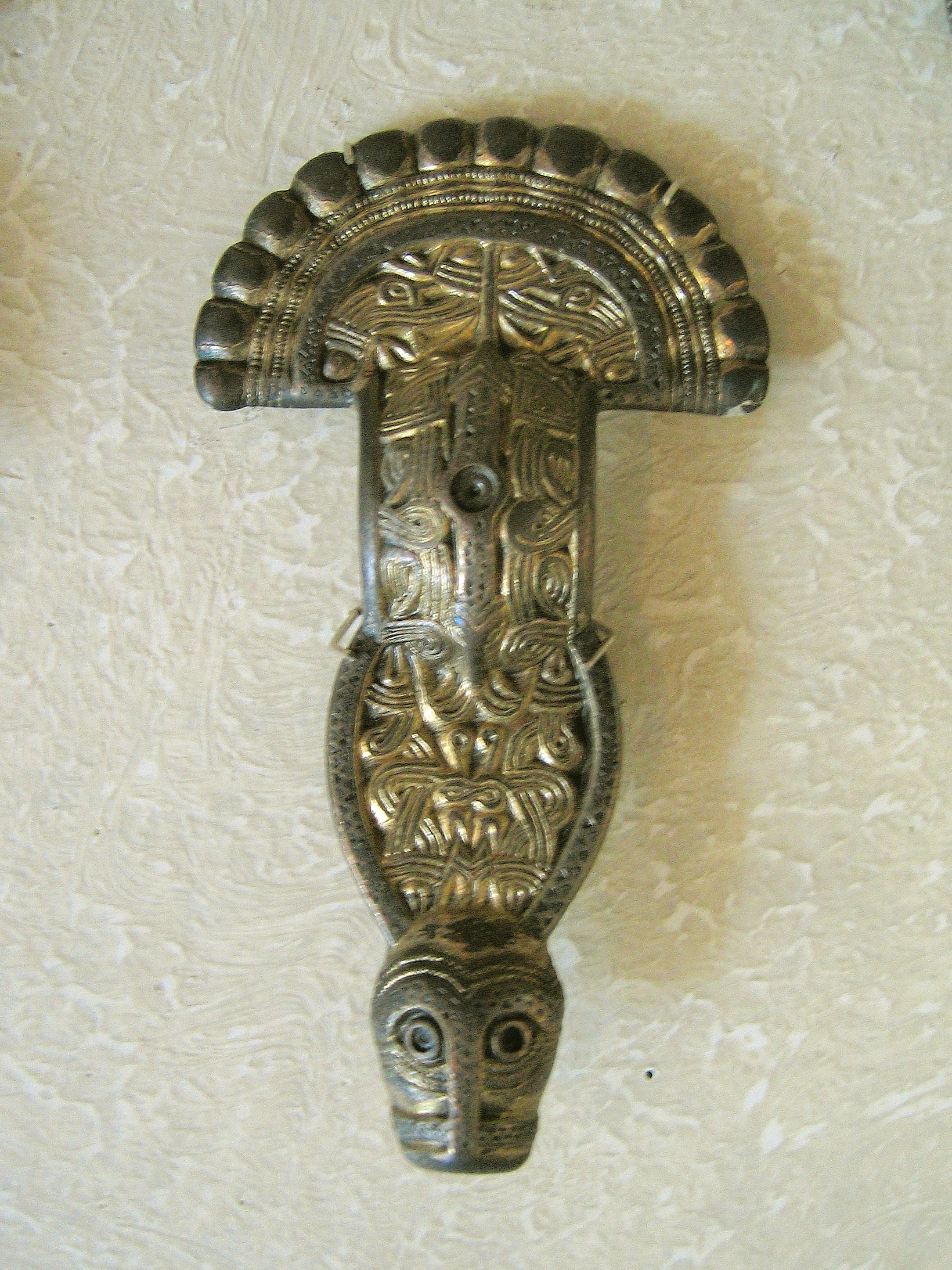
Nordendorf II fibula

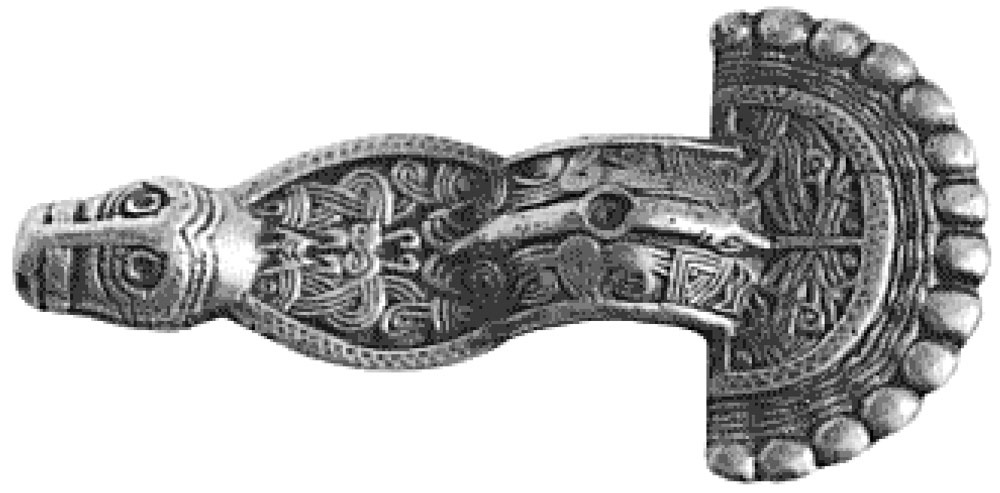
The Nordendorf II fibula

The second fibula has a short, partly illegible inscription, read as

?irl?ioel?

This has been interpreted as birl[i]n io elk "(little) bear and elk".

== See also ==
- Pforzen buckle
