= Westeremden yew-stick =

Pre–Old Frisian runic inscription

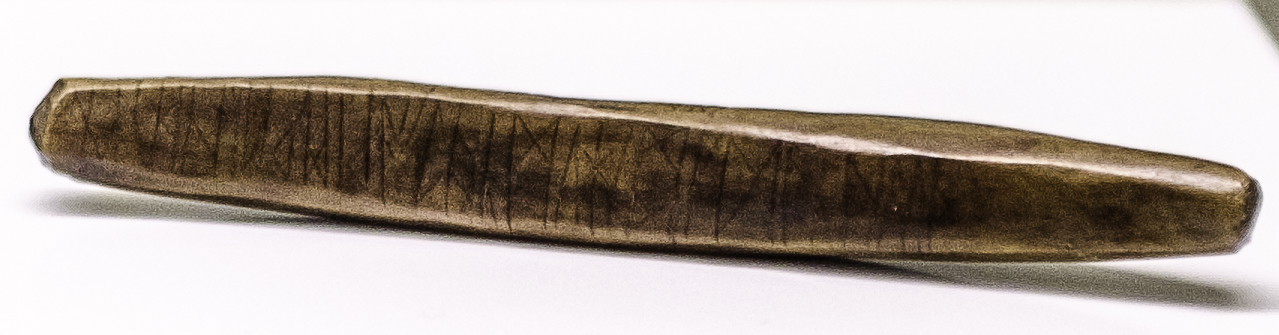
The Westeremden yew stick.

The Westeremden yew-stick is a yew-wood stick found in Westeremden in the Groningen province of the Netherlands in 1917. It bears a Pre–Old Frisian runic inscription, dated to the second half of the 8th century. With a total of 41 letters, this is the longest of the extant Frisian runic inscriptions.

== Transliteration ==
The inscription is divided into three lines, as follows:

ᚩᛈᚻᚳᛗᚢᛡᛁᛅᛞᚪᚳᛗᛚᚢᚦ:
ᚹᛁᛗᛟᚳᚻᚦᚢᚴᛅ
ᛁᚹᛁᚩᚢᛞᚢᚿᚩᛚᛖ:

Runes with unfamiliar shapes or uncertain values are:

- , a Spiegelrune of ᛒ, similar to a variant of ᛥ stan, transliterated as B below
- , a Spiegelrune of ᛈ, similar to a variant of ᛥ stan, transliterated as P below
- , like Younger Futhark kaun, transliterated as K below
- ᚳ (like Anglo-Saxon cen, occurring three times); it apparently represents a vowel, likely æ, replacing absent ᚫ æsc
- ᛅ (like Younger Futhark ar), transliterated as A below
- ᚴ, a "bookhand-s", transliterated as S below
- ᚿ, like a short-twig n, probably for ᚾ n

With these decisions, the transliteration may be:

ophæmujiBAdaæmluþ:
wimœBæhþuSA
iwioKuPdunale:

== Interpretations ==
Seebold (1990) reads (transliterating g for j, v for B, ë for A, ô for œ):

ophæmu givëda amluþ:iwi ok upduna (a)le wimôv æh þusë

Looijenga (1997) reads:

op hæmu jibada æmluþ : iwi ok up duna (a)le wimœd æh þusa

This reading gives rise to an interpretation along the lines of

"luck (amluþ) stays (gibada) at home (op hæmu); and (ok) at the yew (iwi) may it grow (ale) on the hill (up duna); Wimœd has (æh) this (þusa)."

or paraphrased more loosely, "At the homestead stays good fortune, may it also grow near the yew on the terp; Wimœd owns this."

In a controversial suggestion going back to 1937, the sequence æmluþ has often been interpreted as a reference to Amleth ("Hamlet"). The inscription is here interpreted as

ophamu gistadda amluþ : iwim ost ah þukn iwi os ust dukale

and given the translation

"Amluth took his (fighting) position on the high place. Before his yews the waves cowered. May the waves cower before this yew."

The association has led to speculative proposals to the point that Quak (1991) called for a re-examination for the inscription with the ironic caveat "maybe disregarding associations with Hamlet or Amluth".
