= Proto-Norse language =

Progenitor of Old Norse

Proto-Norse
- Ancient Nordic
- Region: Scandinavia
- Era: 2nd to 8th centuries
- Language family: Indo-European: Germanic; Proto-Norse
- Writing system: Elder Futhark

Language codes
- ISO 639-3: –
- Glottolog: olde1239
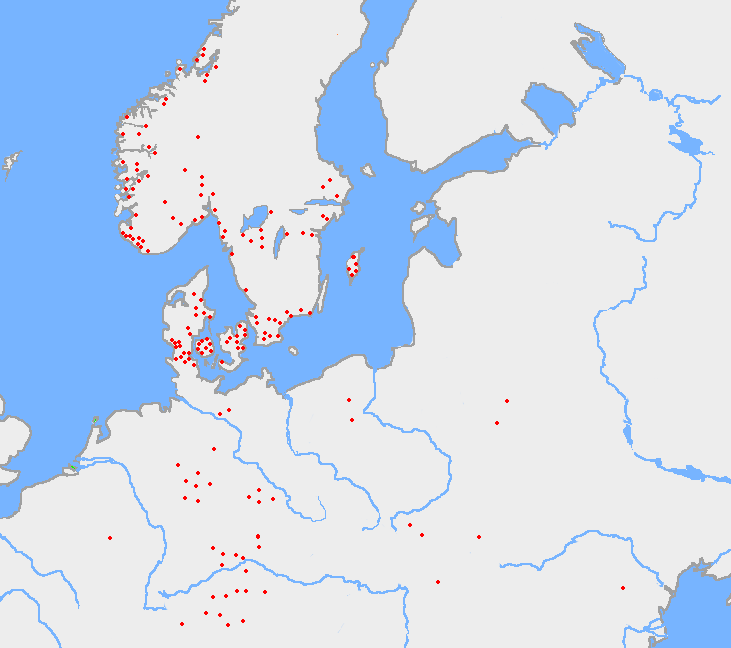
- Map of Elder Futhark inscription finds

Proto-Norse, or Ancient Nordic, was an Indo-European language spoken in Scandinavia that is thought to have evolved as a northern dialect of Proto-Germanic in the first centuries CE. It is the earliest stage of a characteristically North Germanic language, and the language attested in the oldest Scandinavian Elder Futhark inscriptions, spoken from around the 2nd to the 8th centuries CE (corresponding to the late Roman Iron Age and the Germanic Iron Age). It evolved into the dialects of Old Norse at the beginning of the Viking Age around 800 CE, which later themselves evolved into the modern North Germanic languages (Faroese, Icelandic, the Continental Scandinavian languages, and their dialects).

== Phonology ==
Proto-Norse phonology probably did not differ substantially from that of Proto-Germanic. Although the phonetic realisation of several phonemes had probably changed over time, the overall system of phonemes and their distribution remained largely unchanged. Phones written in parentheses represent allophones and are not themselves independent phonemes.

=== Consonants ===
		Labial	Coronal		Dorsal		Glottal
		Labial	plain	sib.	plain	labzd.	Glottal
Nasal		m	n		(ŋ)	(ŋʷ)	
Stop	voiceless	p	t		k	kʷ	
Stop	voiced	b	d		(ɡ)	ɡʷ	
Fricative	voiceless	ɸ	θ	s		ʍ	h
Fricative	voiced	(β)	(ð)	ʀ [ʒ ~ ʐ^{?}]	ɣ		
Sonorant	median		r		j	w	
Sonorant	lateral		l				

1. /n/ assimilated to a following velar consonant. It was [ŋ] before a plain velar, and probably [ŋʷ] before a labial-velar consonant.
2. Unlike its Proto-Germanic ancestor /x/, the phoneme /h/ probably no longer had a velar place of articulation. It eventually disappeared except word-initially.
3. [β], [ð] and [ɡ] were allophones of /b/, /d/ and /ɣ/. The former two appeared word medially, while the latter only after nasal [ŋ]. Plosives appeared when the consonants were lengthened (geminated), and also after a nasal consonant, and [l] for /d/. Word-finally, /b/, /d/ and /ɡ/ were devoiced and merged with /p/, /t/, /k/.
4. The exact realisation of the phoneme traditionally written as ʀ in transcriptions of runic Norse (not to be confused with the phonetic symbol /ʀ/ used in other languages), is unclear. While it was a simple alveolar sibilant in Proto-Germanic (as in Gothic), it eventually underwent rhotacization and merged with /r/ towards the end of the runic period. It may have been pronounced as [ʒ] or [ʐ], tending towards a trill in the later period. The sound was still written with its own letter in runic Old East Norse around the end of the first millennium.

=== Vowels ===
The system of vowels differed somewhat more from that of Proto-Germanic than the consonants. Earlier /ɛː/ had been lowered to /ɑː/, and unstressed /ɑi/ and /ɑu/ had developed into /eː/ and /ɔː/. Shortening of word-final vowels had eliminated the Proto-Germanic overlong vowels.

Oral vowels
	Front		Back	
	short	long	short	long
Close	i (y)	iː (yː)	u	uː
Mid	e (ø)	eː (øː)	o	ɔː
Open	(æ)	(æː)	ɑ	ɑː

Nasal vowels
	Front		Back	
	short	long	short	long
Close	ĩ?	ĩː	ũ?	ũː
Mid			ɔ̃	ɔ̃ː
Open			ɑ̃?	ɑ̃ː

1. /o/ had developed from /u/ through a-mutation. It also occurred word-finally as a result of the shortening of Proto-Germanic /ɔː/.
2. The long nasal vowels /ɑ̃ː/, /ĩː/ and /ũː/ occurred only before /h/. Their presence was noted in the 12th-century First Grammatical Treatise, and they survive in modern Elfdalian.
3. All other nasal vowels occurred only word-finally, although it is unclear whether they had retained their nasality in Proto-Norse or had already merged with the oral vowels. The vowels /o/ and /ɔ̃/ were contrastive, however, as the former eventually developed into /u/ (triggering u-mutation) while the latter was lowered to /ɑ/.
4. The back vowels probably had central or front allophones when /i/ or /j/ followed, as a result of i-mutation:
  - /ɑ/ > [æ], /ɑː/ > [æː]
  - /u/ > [ʉ], /uː/ > [ʉː] (later /y/, /yː/)
  - /ɔː/ > [ɞː] (later [œː] or [øː])
  - /o/ did not originally occur before /i/ or /j/, but it was later introduced by analogy (as can be seen on the Gallehus horns). Its allophone was probably [ɵ], later [ø].
5. Towards the end of the Proto-Norse period, stressed /e/ underwent breaking, becoming a rising diphthong /jɑ/.
6. Also towards the end of the Proto-Norse period, u-mutation began to take effect, which created rounded allophones of unrounded vowels.

=== Accent ===
Old Norse had a stress accent which fell on the first syllable, like its ancestor, Proto-Germanic. Several scholars have proposed that Proto-Norse also had a separate pitch accent, which was inherited from Proto-Indo-European and has evolved into the tonal accents of modern Swedish and Norwegian, which in turn have evolved into the stød of modern Danish. Another recently advanced theory is that each Proto-Norse long syllable and every other short syllable received stress, marked by pitch, eventually leading to the development of the Swedish and Norwegian tonal accent distinction. Finally, quite a number of linguists have assumed that even the first phonetic rudiments of the distinction did not appear until the Old Norse period.

== Attestations ==
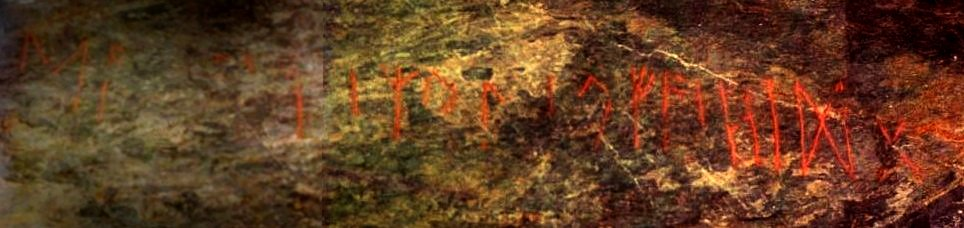
Composite photograph of the Einang stone inscription (c. 400)

All attestations of Proto-Norse are Elder Futhark inscriptions. There are about 260 of these inscriptions in Proto-Norse, the earliest dating to the 2nd century.

=== Examples ===
- Øvre Stabu spearhead, Oppland, Norway. Second century raunijaz, ON raun "tester", cf. Norwegian røyne "try, test". Swedish rön "finding" and utröna "find out". The word formation with a suffix ija is evidence of Sievers' law.
- Golden Horn of Gallehus 2, South Jutland, Denmark 400 CE, ek hlewagastiz holtijaz horna tawido, "I, Hlewagastis of Holt, made the horn." Note again the ija suffix
- Tune stone, Østfold, Norway, 400 CE. ek wiwaz after woduride witadahalaiban worahto. [me]z woduride staina þrijoz dohtriz dalidun arbija sijostez arbijano, "I, Wiwaz, after Woduridaz bread-warden wrought. For me Woduridaz, the stone, three daughters prepared, the most noble of heirs."
- The Einang stone, near Fagernes, Norway, is dated to the 4th century. It contains the message [ek go]dagastiz runo faihido, "[I, Go]dguest drew the secret," in O–N ek goðgestr rún fáða. The first four letters of the inscription have not survived and are conjectured, and the personal name could well have been Gudagasti or something similar.
- Kragehul spear, Denmark, c. 500 CE. ek erilaz asugisalas muha haite, gagaga ginuga, he...lija... hagala wijubi... possibly, "I, Eril of Asgisl, was named Muha, ga-ga-ga mighty-ga (ga being most likely an abbreviation of indeterminable reference), (incomplete) hail I consecrate."
- The Björketorp Runestone, Blekinge, Sweden, is one of three menhirs, but is the only one of them where, in the 6th century, someone wrote a curse: haidʀ runo runu falh'k hedra ginnarunaʀ argiu hermalausʀ ... weladauþe saz þat brytʀ uþarba spa "Here, I have hidden the secret of powerful runes, strong runes. The one who breaks this memorial will be eternally tormented by anger. Treacherous death will hit him. I foresee perdition."
- The Rö runestone, in Bohuslän, Sweden, was raised in the early 5th century and is the longest early inscription: Ek Hrazaz/Hraþaz satido [s]tain[a] ... Swabaharjaz s[a]irawidaz. ... Stainawarijaz fahido. "I, Hrazaz/Hraþaz raised the stone ... Swabaharjaz with wide wounds. ... Stainawarijaz (Stoneguardian's) carved."

=== Loanwords ===
A very extensive Proto-Norse loanword layer exists in the Sámi languages. Some Proto-Norse names are found in Latin works, like tribal names like Suiones (*Sweoniz, "Swedes"). Others can be conjectured from manuscripts such as Beowulf.

== Evolution ==
=== Proto-Germanic to Proto-Norse ===
The differences between attested Proto-Norse and unattested Proto-Germanic are rather small. Separating Proto-Norse from Northwest Germanic can be said to be a matter of convention, as sufficient evidence from the remaining parts of the Germanic-speaking area (Northern Germany and the Netherlands) is lacking in a degree to provide sufficient comparison. Inscriptions found in Scandinavia are considered to be in Proto-Norse. Several scholars argue about this subject matter. Wolfgang von Krause sees the language of the runic inscriptions of the Proto-Norse period as an immediate precursor to Old Norse, but Elmer Antonsen views them as Northwest Germanic.

One early difference shared by the West Germanic dialects is the monophthongization of unstressed diphthongs. Unstressed *ai became ē, as in haitē (Kragehul I) from Proto-Germanic *haitai, and unstressed *au likewise became ō. Characteristic is also the Proto-Norse lowering of Proto-Germanic stressed *ē to ā, which is demonstrated by the pair Gothic mēna and Old Norse máni (English moon). Proto-Norse thus differs from the early West Germanic dialects, as West Germanic ē was lowered to ā regardless of stress; in Old Norse, earlier unstressed ē surfaces as i. For example, the weak third-person singular past tense ending -dē appears in Old High German as -ta, with a low vowel, but in Old Norse as -ði, with a high vowel.

The time that *z, a voiced apical alveolar fricative, represented in runic writing by the algiz rune, changed to ʀ, an apical post-alveolar approximant, is debated. If the general Proto-Norse principle of devoicing of consonants in final position is taken into account, *z, if retained, would have been devoiced to [s] and would be spelled as such in runes. There is, however, no trace of that in the Elder Futhark runic inscriptions, so it can be safely assumed that the quality of this consonant must have changed before the devoicing, or the phoneme would not have been marked with a rune different from the sowilō rune used for s. The quality of the consonant can be conjectured, and the general opinion is that it was something between [z] and [r], the Old Norse reflex of the sound. In Old Swedish, the phonemic distinction between r and ʀ was retained into the 11th century, as shown by the numerous runestones from Sweden from then.

=== Proto-Norse to Old Norse ===
From 500 to 800, two great changes occurred within Proto-Norse. Umlauts appeared, which means that a vowel was influenced by the succeeding vowel or semivowel: Old Norse gestr (guest) came from PN gastiz (guest). Another sound change is known as vowel breaking in which the vowel changed into a diphthong: hjarta from *hertō or fjǫrðr from *ferþuz.

Umlauts resulted in the appearance of the new vowels y (like fylla from *fullijaną) and œ (like dœma from *dōmijaną). The umlauts are divided into three categories: a-umlaut, i-umlaut and u-umlaut; the last was still productive in Old Norse. The first, however, appeared very early, and its effect can be seen already around 500, on the Golden Horns of Gallehus. The variation caused by the umlauts was itself no great disruption in the language. It merely introduced new allophones of back vowels if certain vowels were in following syllables. However, the changes brought forth by syncope made the umlaut-vowels a distinctive non-transparent feature of the morphology and phonology, phonemicising what were previously allophones.

Syncope shortened the long vowels of unstressed syllables; many shortened vowels were lost. Also, most short unstressed vowels were lost. As in PN, the stress accent lay on the first syllable words as PN *katilōz became ON katlar (cauldrons), PN horną was changed into Old Norse horn (horn) and PN gastiz resulted in ON gestr (guest). Some words underwent even more drastic changes, like *habukaz which changed into ON haukr (hawk).
