= Källby =

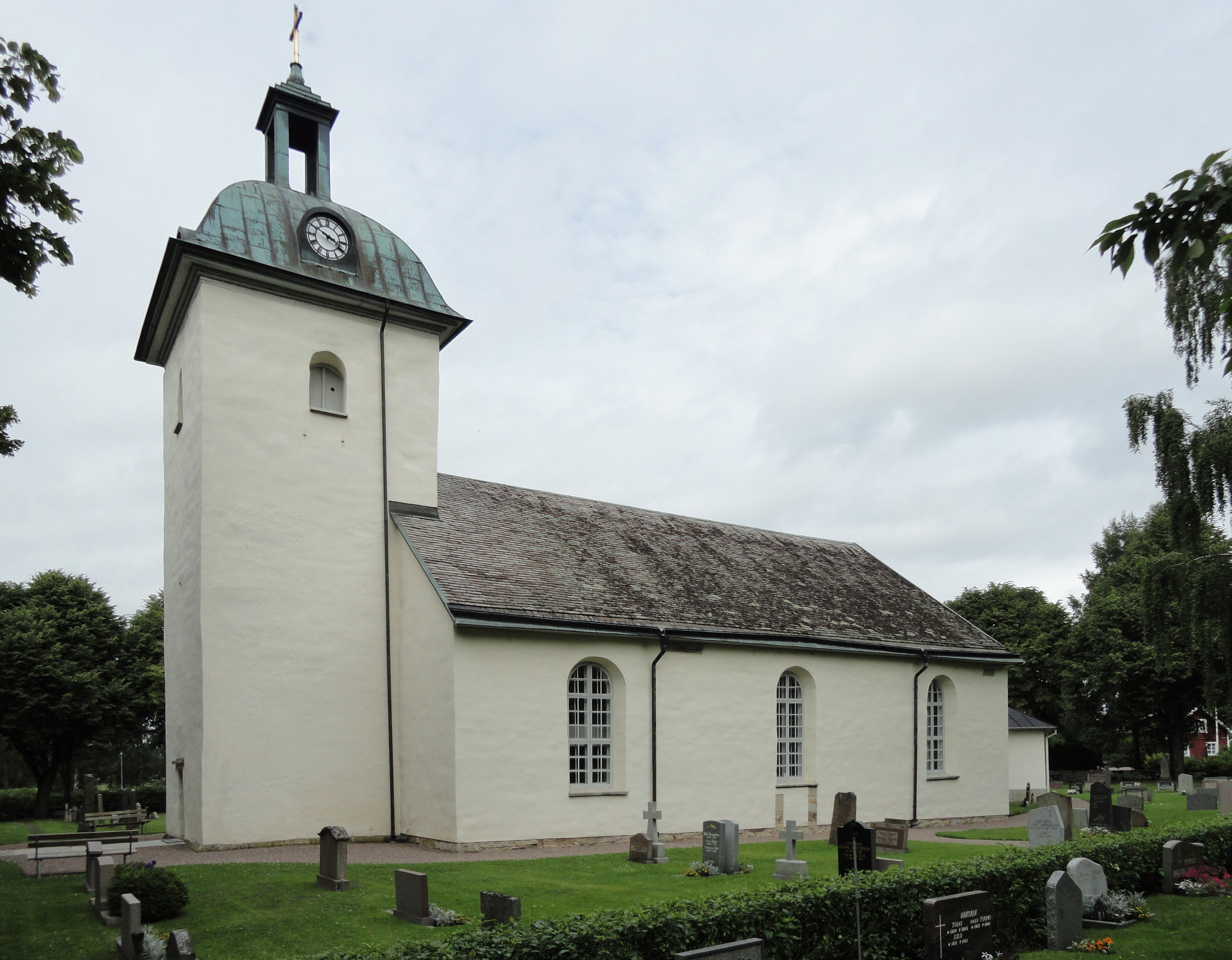
- Källby Church

- Location within Västra Götaland Location within Sweden
- Coordinates: 58°31′N 13°19′E
- Country: Sweden
- Province: Västergötland
- County: Västra Götaland County
- Municipality: Götene Municipality

Area
  - Total: 1.36 km^{2} (0.53 sq mi)

Population (31 December 2010)
  - Total: 1,586
  - Density: 1,168/km^{2} (3,030/sq mi)
- Time zone: UTC+1 (CET)
  - Summer (DST): UTC+2 (CEST)

Källby is a locality situated in Götene Municipality, Västra Götaland County, Sweden. It had 1,586 inhabitants in 2010.

A major industry and employer is Gunnar Dafgård AB, founded in 1937, which manufactures various cold dishes such as pan pizza, pies and ready meals.

Driving distances to:

- Lidköping 12 km,
- Götene 14 km,
- Gothenburg 144 km, and
- Stockholm 339 km 172 on Highway (South Lake)

== See also ==
- Källby Runestones
