= Velinga Parish, Sweden =

Parish in Sweden

Velinga Formerly known as Velinge
- District
- Velinga Parish
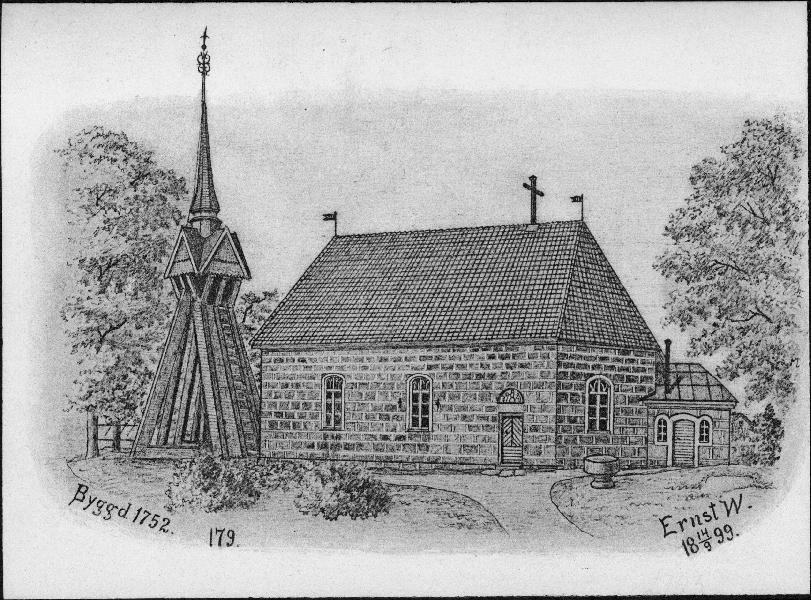

- Flag Coat of arms

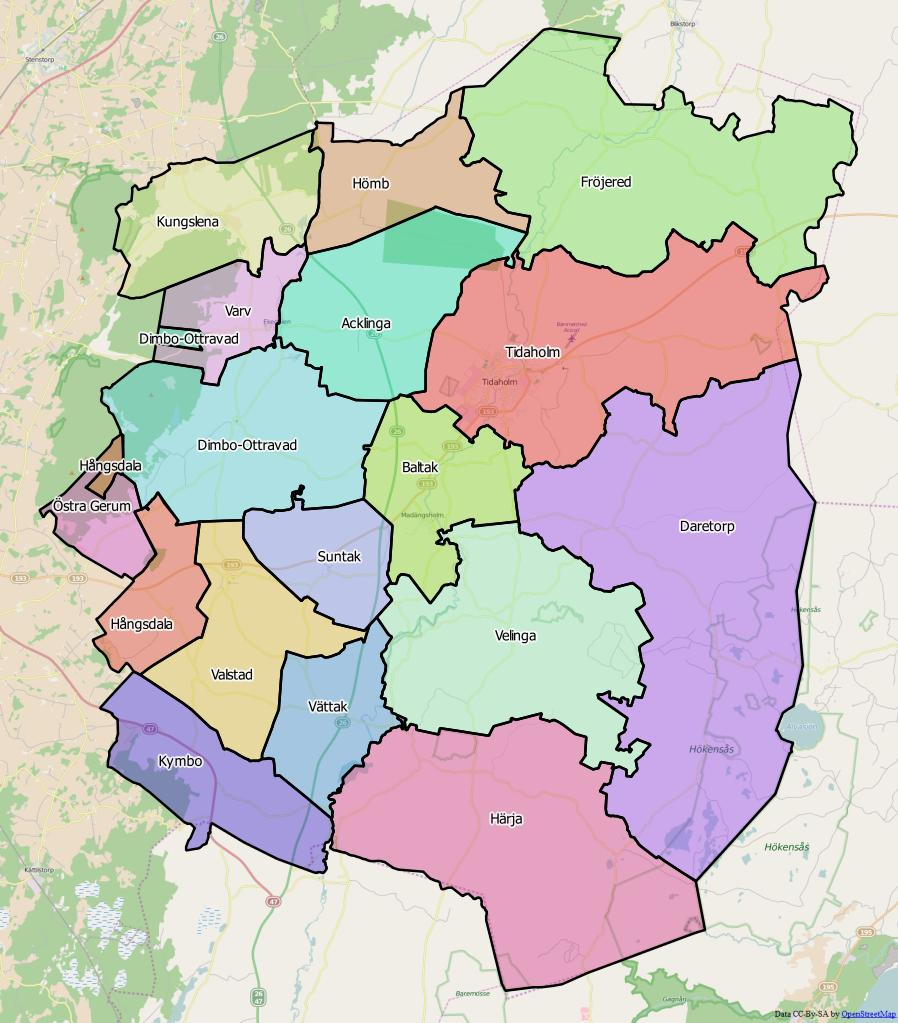
- Coordinates: 58°06′10″N 13°58′00″E

Area
  - Total: 46 km^{2} (18 sq mi)

Population
  - Total: 245
- Postal code: 522 91

Velinga Parish (Swedish: Velinga socken) in Tidaholm Municipality, Västra Götaland County, is a rural parish in a sparsely populated rural area of 17.8 mi^{2} (46.11 km^{2}) in Sweden.

Velinga is notable for its archaeological remains, which include runestones from the Viking Age. Artefacts from the Bronze and Iron Ages have also been found there, most notably at the Lövrudan Archaeological Site, which contains several Bronze and Iron Age stone circles, and cairns, or Bronze Age burial mounds.

The oldest parts of the Romanesque Velinga Church date back to the 1100s, and the medieval Ettaks Church ruins (Ettaks kyrkoruin), which once belonged to a royal estate, were the site of a major archeological excavation in 1970, documented by the Swedish National Heritage Board.

== Geography ==
Velinga Parish lies southeast of Tidaholm. Hökensås is to the forested east, with heights that reach 1115 ft. (340 m.) above sea level. The Tidan River, which flows north, rather than south, sits in the largely agricultural west.

== Regional classifications ==
The National Archives of Sweden (Riksarkivet) document the multiple forms of jurisdiction over the Parish, which have historically included counties, fiefdoms, district courts and courthouses. During the municipal reform of 1862, the Parish's responsibility for ecclesiastical matters was transferred to Velinga Parish, and the Velinga County municipality was formed for civil matters. The county municipality consisted in 1952 of Hökensås County municipality, which in 1974 consisted of Tidaholm municipality. Nowadays, the Parish is part of Västra Götaland County, which was formed in 1998 by the amalgamation of the former counties of Älvsborg, Göteborg och Bohus, and Skaraborg. In 2010, the congregation in Hökensås Parish, which includes Velinga, numbered 245 people.

== Gallery ==
=== Ettaks Church ===
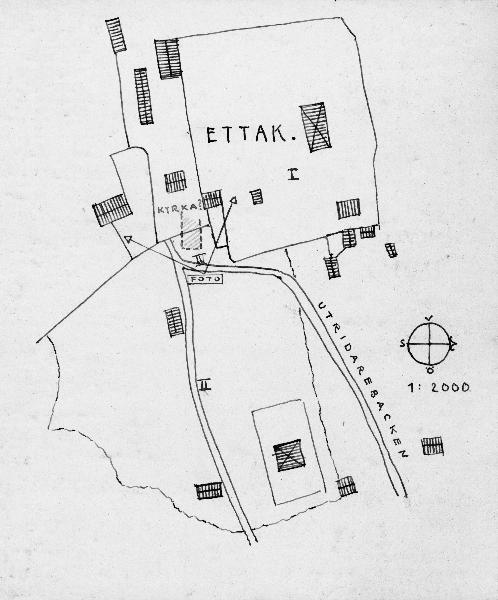
Sketch of the church site and its surroundings.

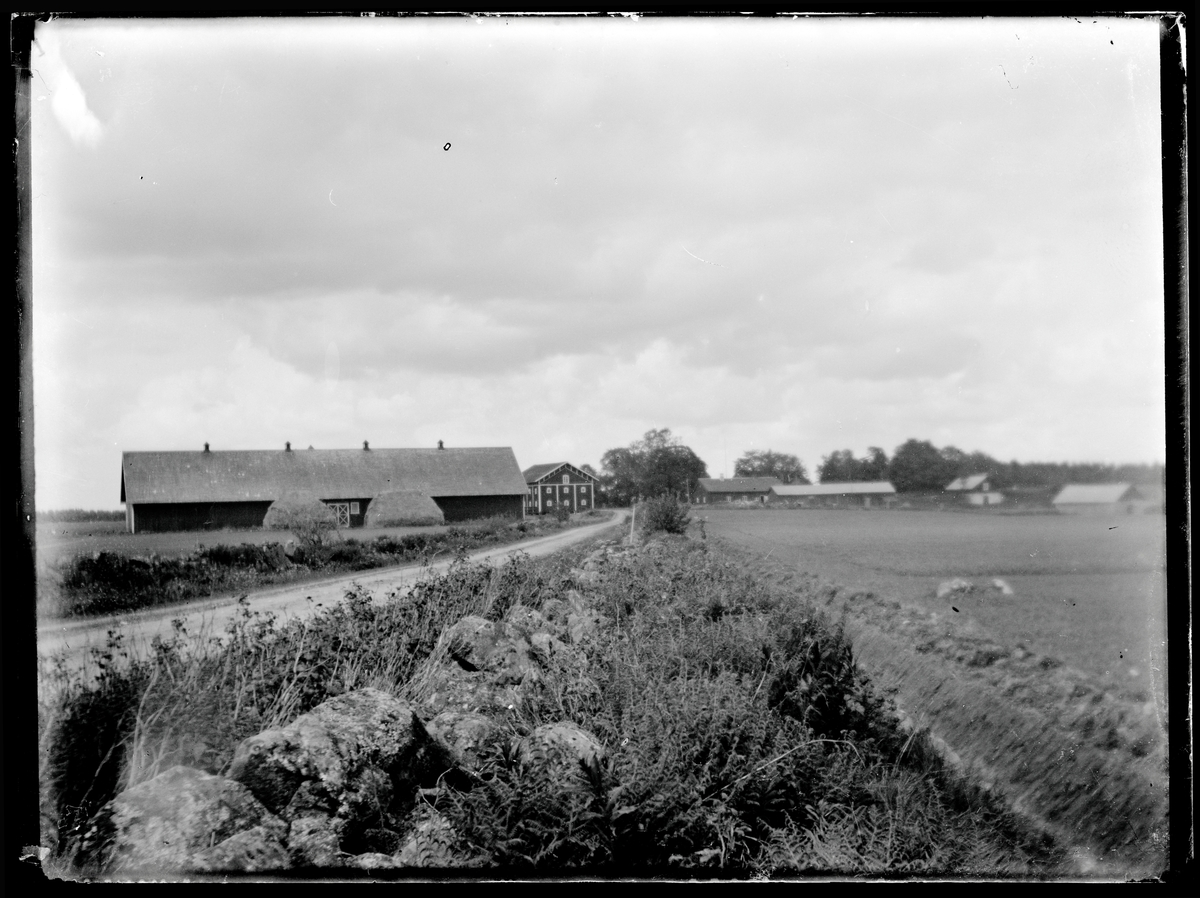
The Ettaks royal estate in 1930.

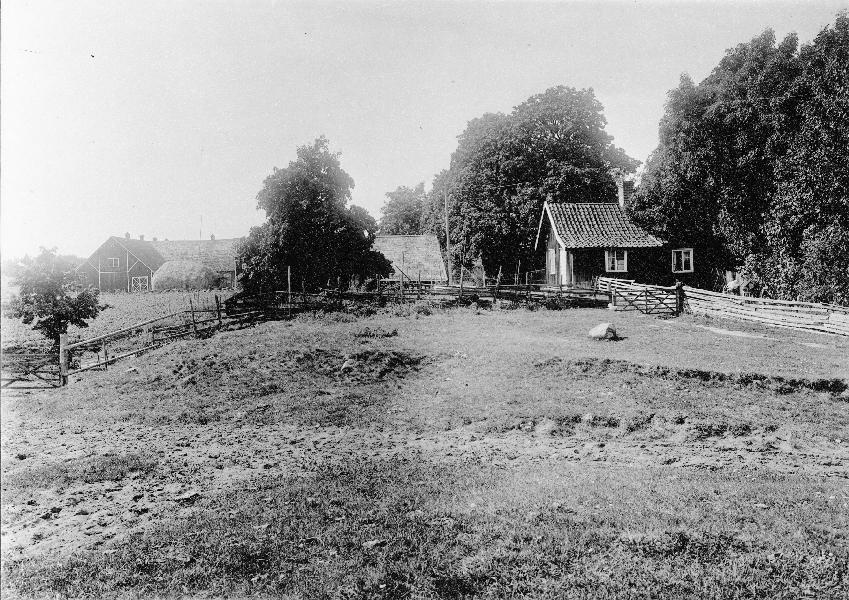
The church site and its surroundings to the west.

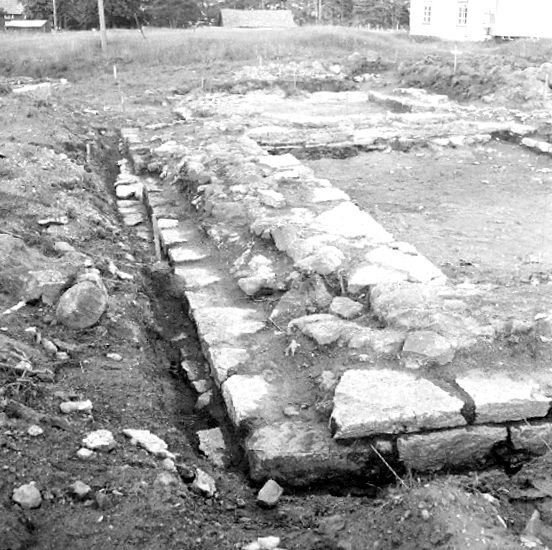
From the excavation of Ettak Church ruins by Nils Beerståhl, 1970.

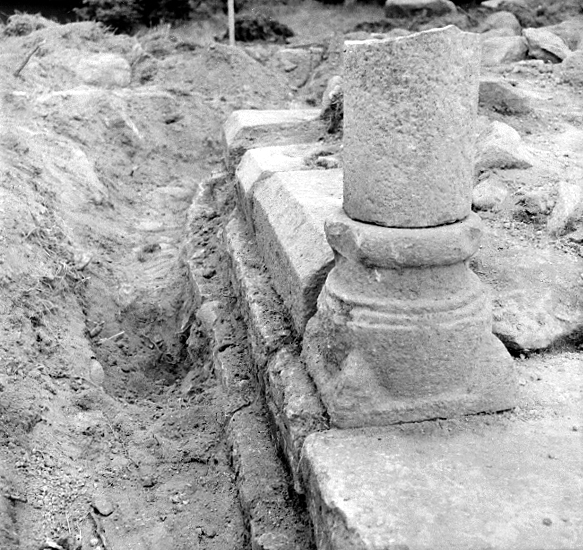
Pillars found in Härja, likely part of larger portal probably comes from Ettak.

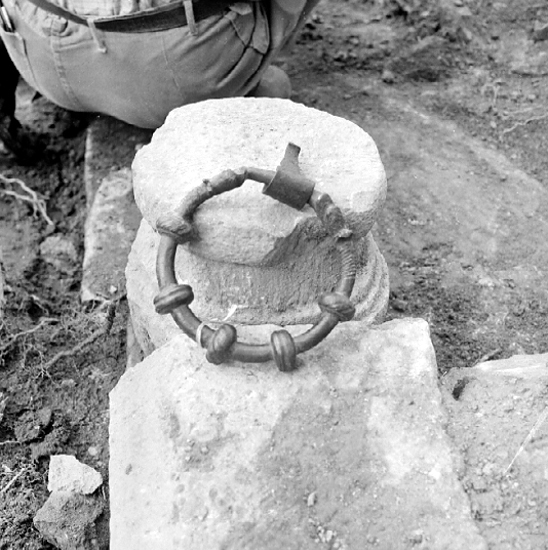
A ring discovered during the excavation, not made of iron.

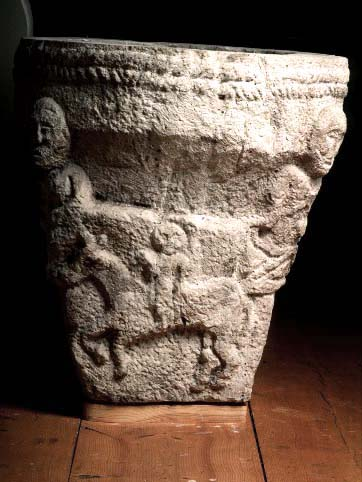
A roof detail on the Baptistery.

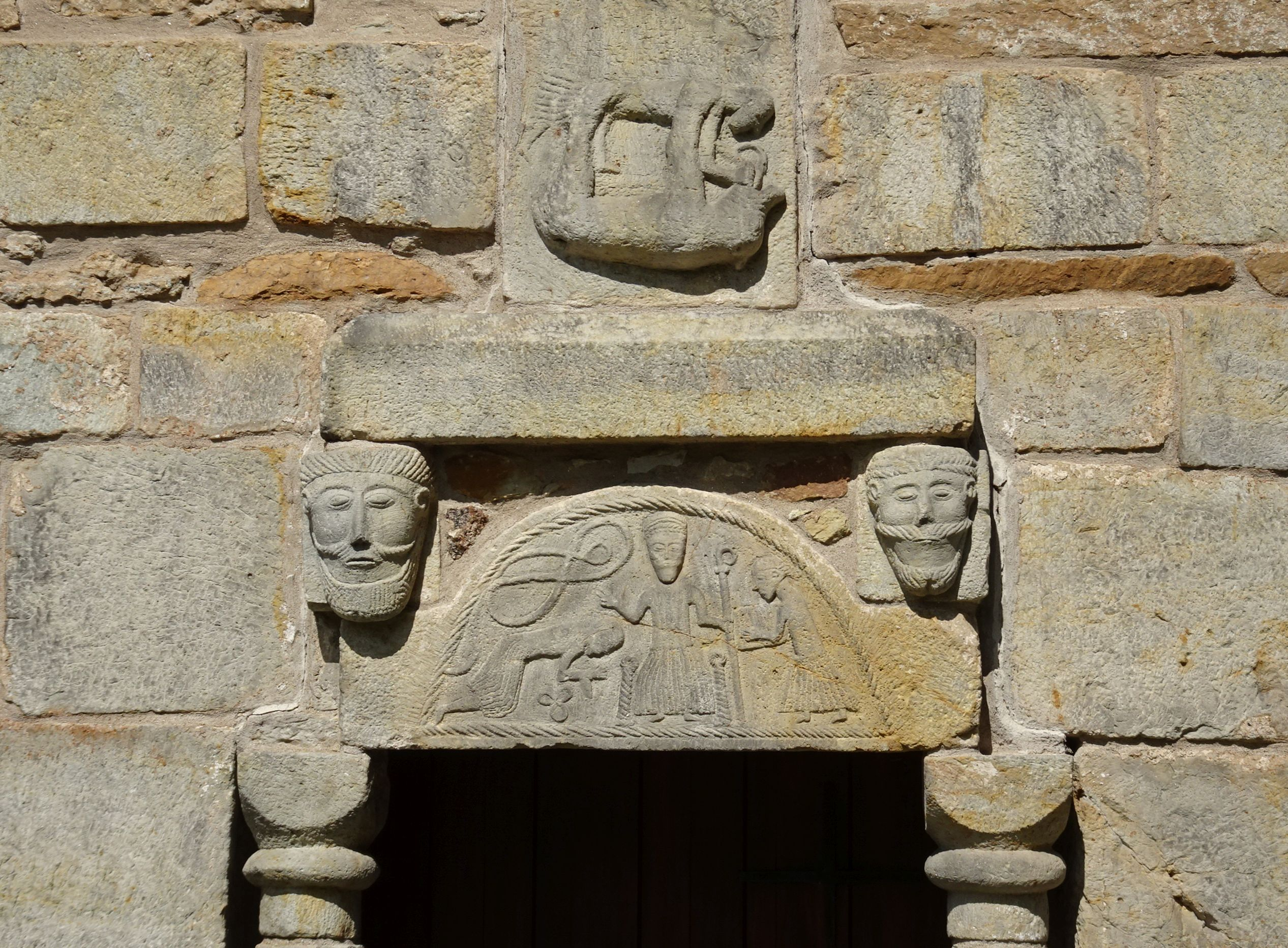
The Romanesque tympanum at Härja parish church, believed to have belonged to the medieval royal estate of nearby Ettak.

=== Velinga Church ===
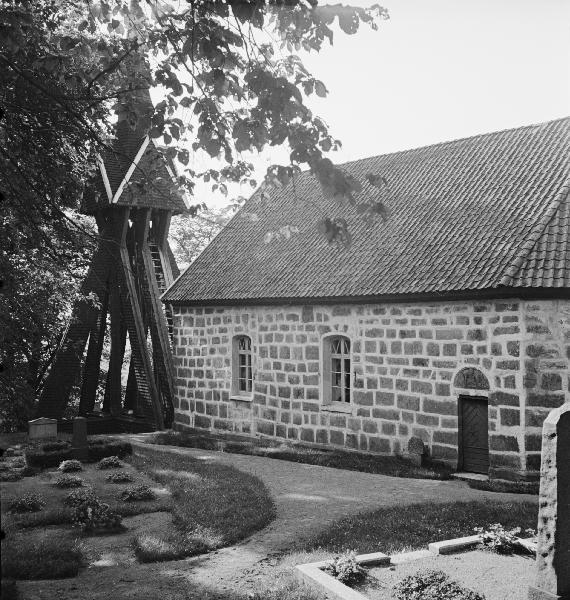
The church exterior from the southwest.

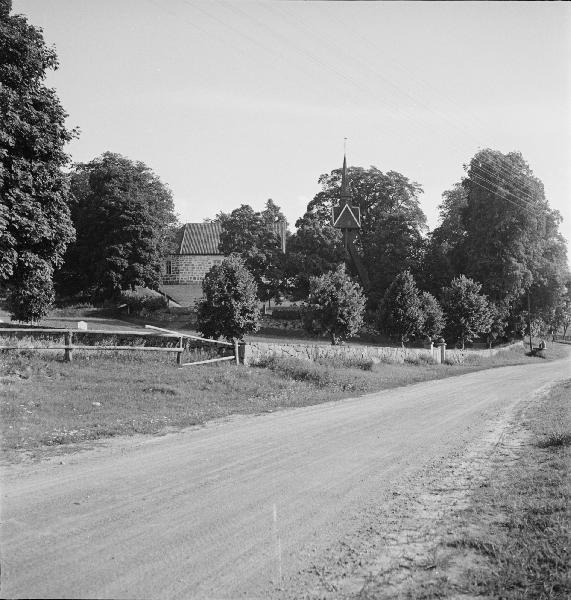
The church from the northwest.

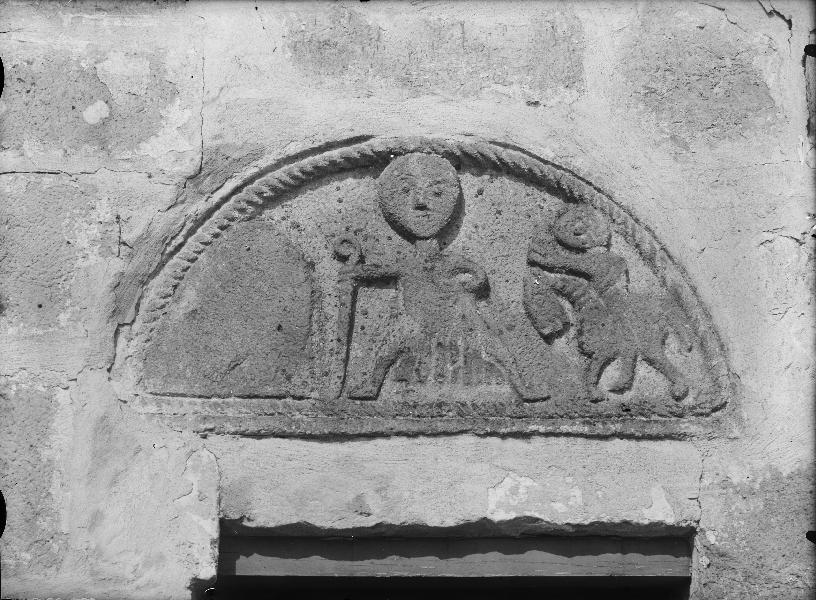
Tympanum exterior detail 1.

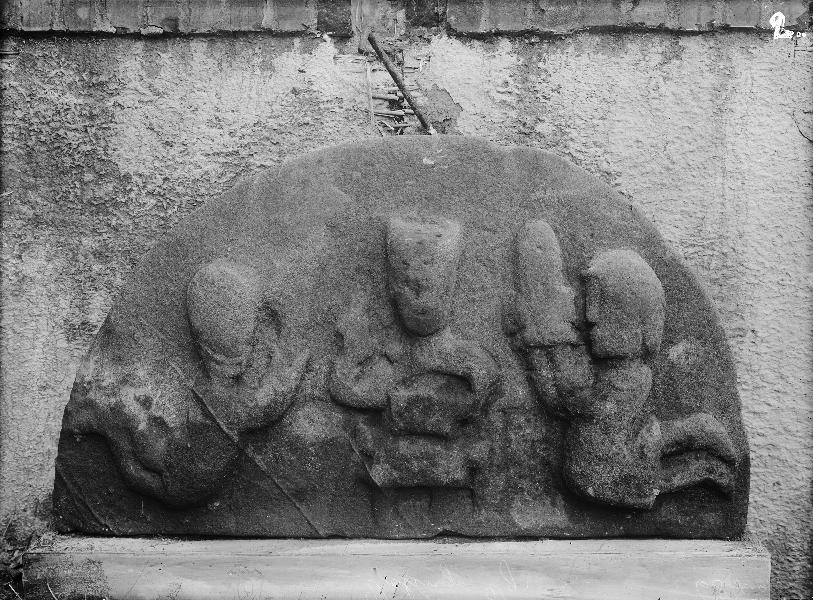
Tympanum exterior detail 2.

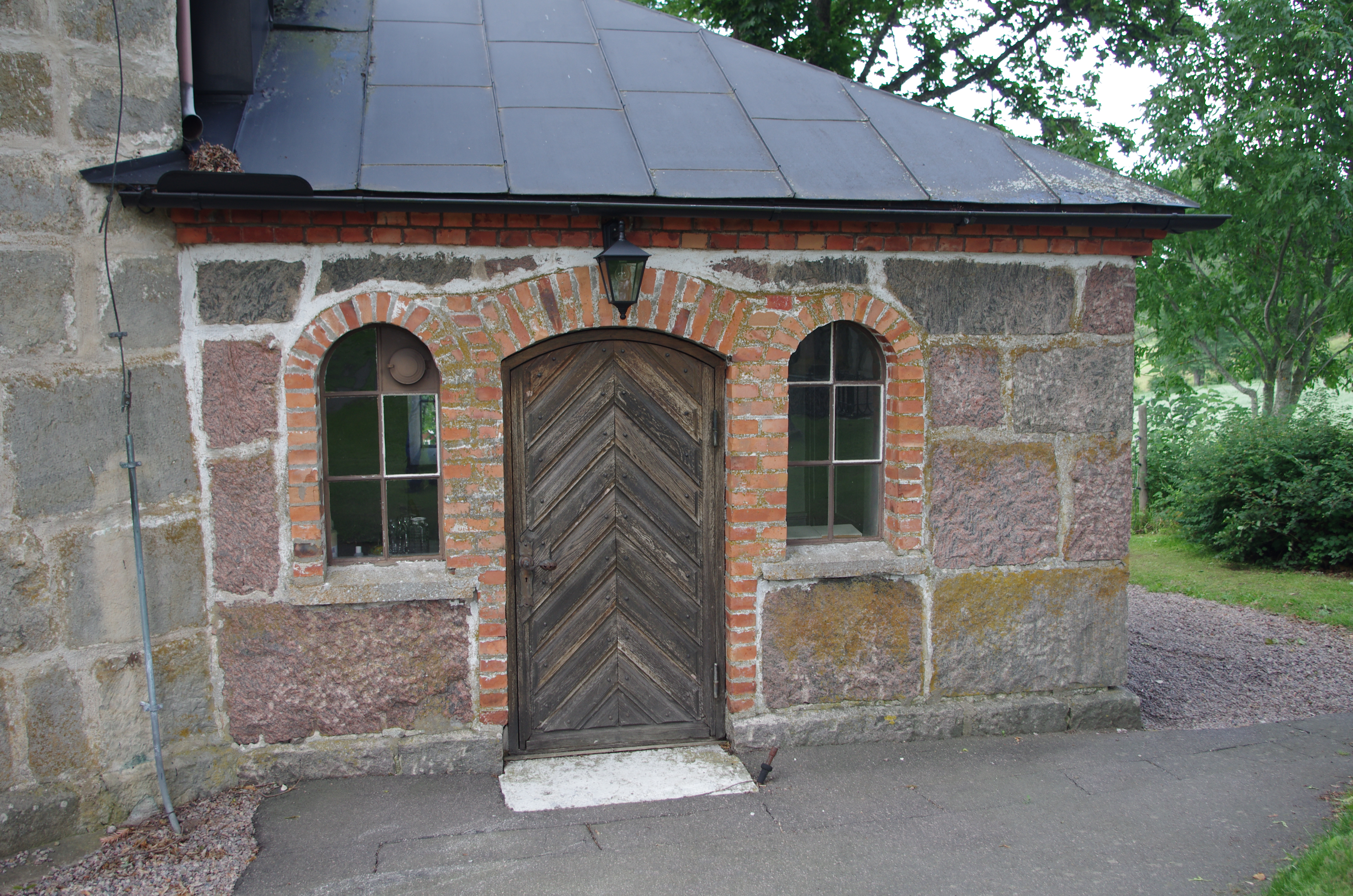
Exterior exit 1.

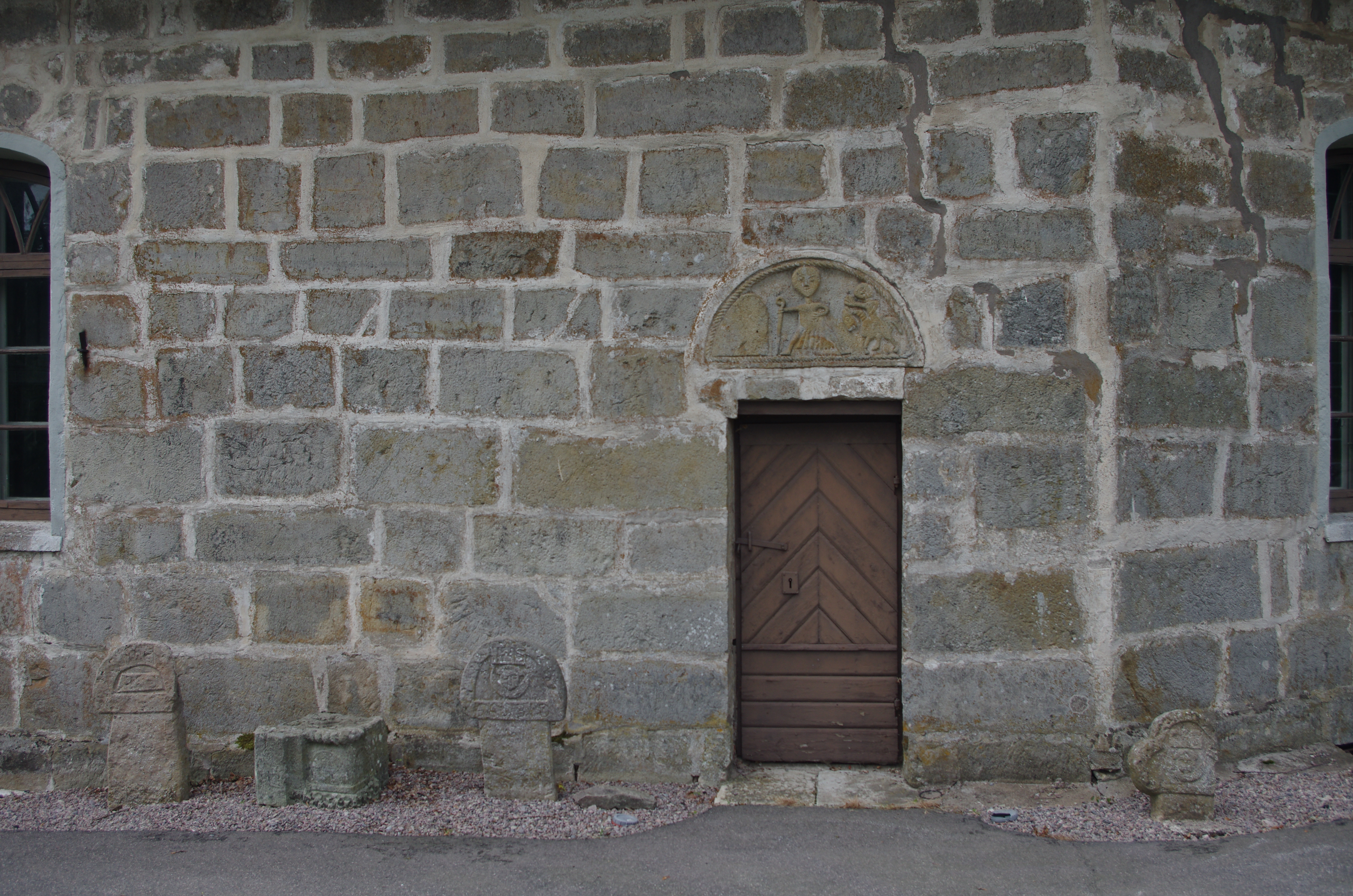
Exterior exit 2.

== See also ==
- Gudhem Abbey
- Källby Runestones
- Viking Art
