= Dafgård =

Dafgård may refer to

- Jörgen Dafgård, a Swedish composer
- Gunnar Dafgård AB, a Swedish food company
