= Dagsnäs Castle =

Coordinates: 58°17′3.50″N 13°29′41.50″E

Site information
- Open to the public: Yes, during summers

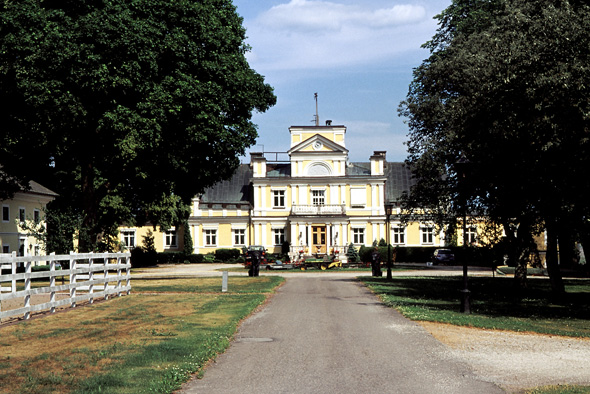
Dagsnäs Castle

Dagsnäs Castle is a castle in Sweden, located 9 km (5.6 mi) south of Skara at Lake Hornborga.

Dagsnäs has very old origins and belonged to the Gumsehuvud family in the 15th century. It was then passed down through the Thott, Soop, Kafle and Uggla families before it was purchased in 1762 by the original antiquarian and patron Per Tham, in whose family it remained until 1864. During Per Tham's time the castle became a cultural center in Västergötland. In 1772–82, the current main building was built in stone. Over the years several runestones from the region have been moved to the castle grounds, including Vg 59 from Norra Härene, Vg 67 from Saleby, Vg 122 from Abrahamstorp, Vg 184 from Smula, and Vg 186 from Timmele.
