= Västergötland Runic Inscription 73 =

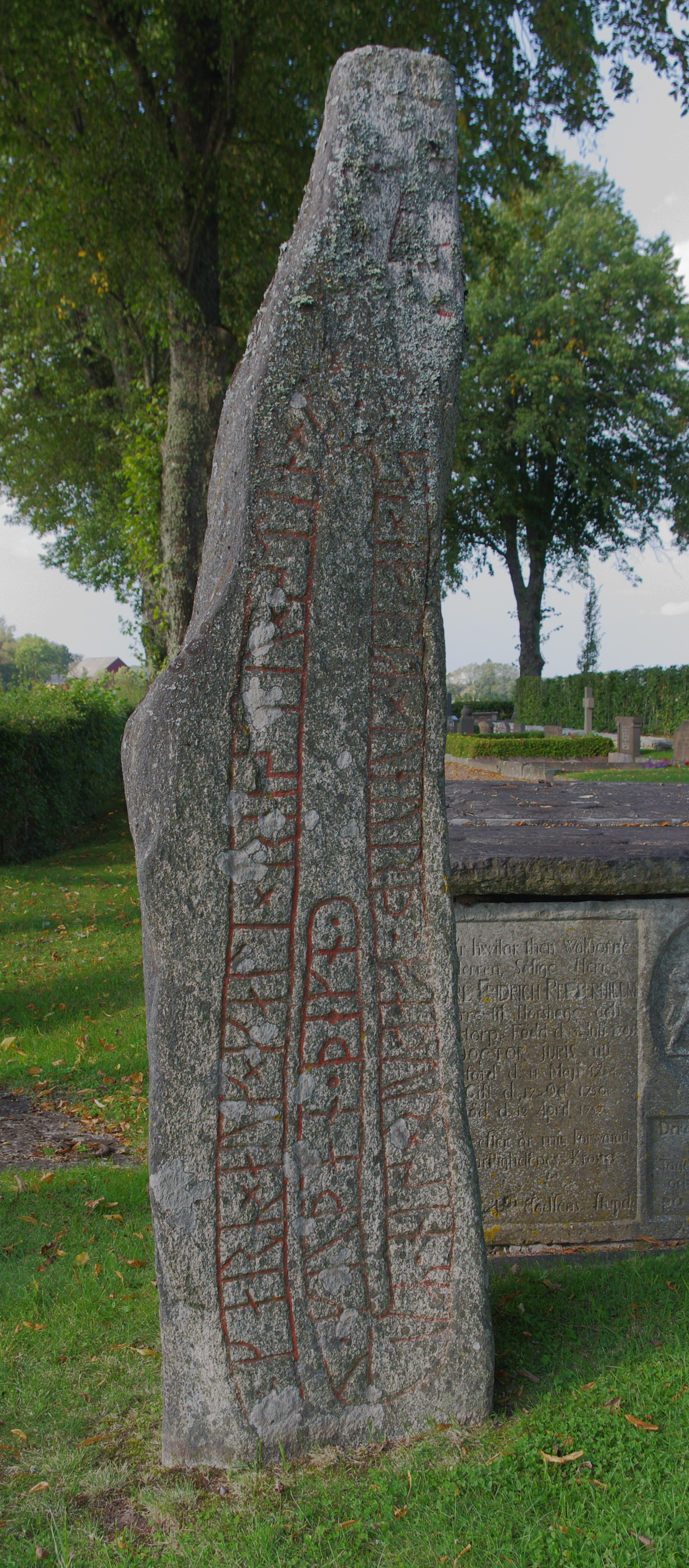
Vg 73 in the Synnerby churchyard.

Västergötland Runic Inscription 73 or Vg 73 is the Rundata catalog number for a Viking Age memorial runestone that is located near the Synnerby church, which is about nine kilometers west of Skara. The stone was raised in memory of a man who was a thegn.

== Description ==
The inscription on Vg 73 consists of runes carved in the younger futhark in a text band that runs along the edge of a tall, narrow stone that is 2.55 meters in height and then curves into the center. A cross is at the top of the inscription. The stone is classified as being carved in runestone style RAK, which is considered to be the oldest style. This is the classification where the ends of the text bands are straight and do not have any attached serpent or beast heads. The stone was noted in a wall of the church in 1936, and was removed and raised in its present location in the churchyard. Before the historic significance of runestones was recognized, they were often re-used as materials in the construction of churches, walls, and bridges.

The runic text states that the stone was raised by two brothers named Kárr and Kali or Kalli in memory of their father Véurðr. The runic inscription states in Old Norse that the father was miok goðan þegn or "a very good thegn." The exact role of thegns in southern Sweden is a matter of debate, but the most common view is that these persons constituted a Nordic elite somehow connected to Danish royal power. About fifty other runestones refer to the deceased being a thegn. Of these, four other runestones use exactly the same phrase, miok goðan þegn, Vg 108 in Tängs gamla, Vg 137 Sörby, Vg 150 in Velanda, and DR 99 in Bjerregrav. The name of the father combines the Old Norse words vé and urðr for a name that means "guardian of the holy place or sanctuary." While this may have been a family name inherited from a goði, which is an Old Norse term for a priest or chieftain, that the father was also a thegn suggests that he was a local chieftain with responsibilities for caring for and arranging feasts at a religious sanctuary. Although the sons were Christian as indicated by their use of a cross in the inscription, one has the name Kárr which is Old Norse for "lock of hair" or "curly hair." It has been suggested that this was a name associated with cultic initiates who grew long hair, and supports an identification of the figure on the inscription as being that of the father in ritual attire. The name Kárr was often combined with that of Odin in Óðinkárr, and appears in a possible cultic initiate reference in the names on inscriptions on DR 4 in Hedeby, DR 81 in Skjern, DR 133 in Skivum, and DR 239 in Gørlev. The name Kárr is used on Vg 56 in Källby, which depicts a figure possibly in cultic attire. Kárr is also used without necessarily any cultic reference in inscriptions Sm 90 in Torshag, Sö 128 in Lids, U 643 and U 644 in Ekilla bro, U 654 in Varpsund, and U 792 in Ulunda, with U 644 and U 654 referring to the same person.

The anonymous runemaster used a punctuation mark to divide each word in the runic text. Most words were divided with an ×, but the phrase "his father" is separated from the first part of the sentence by two dots, and the three Norse words in the phrase meaning "a very good thegn" were each separated with a single dot.

The runestone is known locally as Veurðs sten or "Veurð's stone."

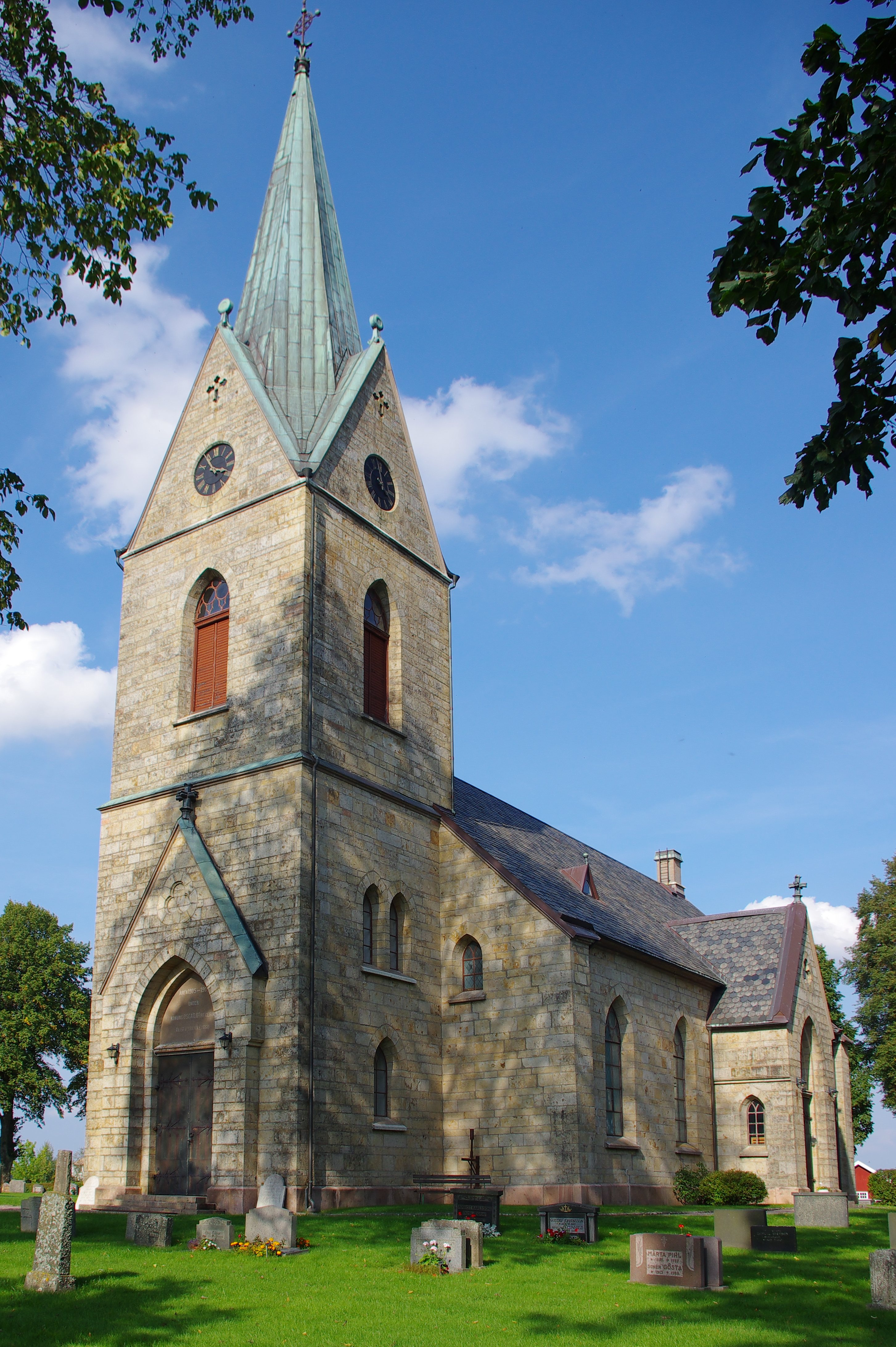
The Synnerby church.

== Inscription ==
=== Transliteration of the runes into Latin characters ===
× karʀ × auk × kali × reistu × stin × þensi × eftiʀ × ueurþ : faþur × sin * muk * kuþan * þekn *

=== Transcription into Old Norse ===
Karr ok Kali/Kalli ræistu stæin þannsi æftiʀ Veurð, faður sinn, miok goðan þegn.

=== Translation in English ===
Kárr and Kali/Kalli raised this stone in memory of Véurðr, their father, a very good thegn.
