= Danish Runic Inscription 110 =

Coordinates: 56°26′4.43″N 10°14′47.19″E

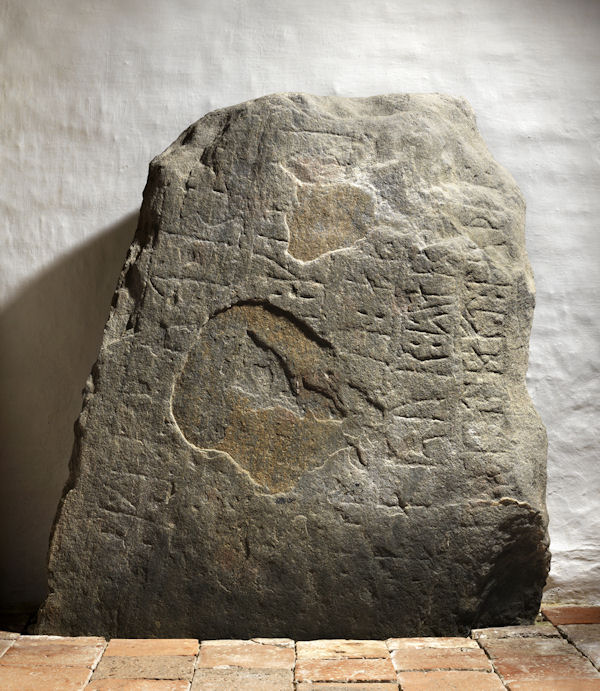
DR 110

DR 110, or the Virring stone, is a runestone made of granite that measures 155 cm (61 in) in height, 120 cm (47 in) in width and 27 cm (11 in) in thickness. It is written in Old East Norse in the Younger Futhark, and the runestone style is in a form called RAK.

It was discovered in 1865 being used as the threshold for the church porch in the church of Virring in Denmark. It is tentatively dated to the period 900-960 based on the runes and the language. It had been severely worn down so many runes are missing.

A peculiarity in the inscription is the m rune which has a rounded top. It also contains an invocation to the Norse god Thor (Þor wigi þæssi kumbl), which it shares with a number of other runestones in Sweden and Denmark: the Rök runestone (Þōrr), the Velanda Runestone (Þorr vigi), Glavendrup stone (Þor wigi þæssi runaʀ), Sønder Kirkeby Runestone (Þor wigi runaʀ) and possibly Sö 140 (Siði(?) Þorr(?)).

== Inscription ==
Below follows a presentation of the runestones based on the Rundata project. The transcriptions into Old Norse are in the Swedish and Danish dialect to facilitate comparison with the inscriptions, while the English translation provided by Rundata gives the names in the de facto standard dialect (the Icelandic and Norwegian dialect):

÷ ki-mutr ÷ ¶ ... ...n ÷ k(a)rþi ¶ ÷ m(i)n(i) ÷ --(u) ÷ af(t) (÷) ¶ ÷ sasur ÷ star ¶ r(i)sþi ÷ stin ÷ aft ÷ tuþan ÷
{} Ge[ʀ]mundr(?) {} {} ... [su]n {} gærþi {} {} minni {} [þ]ø {} æft {} {} {} Sazur. {} Star {} resþi {} sten {} æft {} døþan. {}
"Geirmundr(?) ... son made these memorials in memory of Sassurr. Starr raised the stone in memory of the deceased."

þur ÷ uiki ÷ þisi ÷ kuml ÷
Þor {} wigi {} þæssi {} kumbl. {}
"May Þórr hallow this monument."

== Sources ==
- Rundata
- Virring-sten at Danske Runeindskrifter
