= Velanda =

- Location within Västra Götaland Location within Sweden
- Coordinates: 58°13′N 12°19′E
- Country: Sweden
- Province: Västergötland
- County: Västra Götaland County
- Municipality: Trollhättan Municipality

Area
  - Total: 0.51 km^{2} (0.20 sq mi)

Population (31 December 2010)
  - Total: 581
  - Density: 1,150/km^{2} (3,000/sq mi)
- Time zone: UTC+1 (CET)
  - Summer (DST): UTC+2 (CEST)

Velanda is a locality situated in Trollhättan Municipality, Västra Götaland County, Sweden with 581 inhabitants in 2010.

== See also ==
- Velanda Runestone
