= Velanda Runestone =

Runestone in Velanda, Sweden

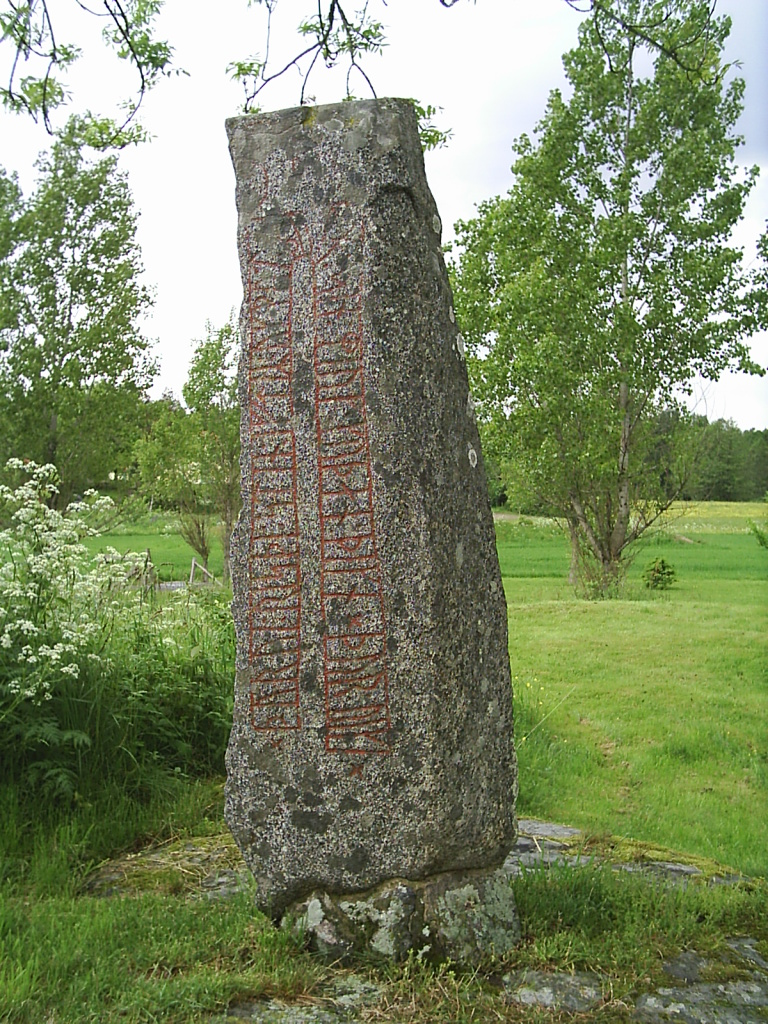
- Created: probably the early eleventh century
- Discovered: 1910; Velanda, Västergötland, Sweden
- Discovered by: Jacobsson
- Rundata ID: Vg 150
- Runemaster: unknown

Text – Native
- Old Norse : See article.

Translation
- See article

The Velanda Runestone (Swedish: Velandastenen), designated as Vg 150 in the Rundata catalog, is a runestone dated to the late tenth century or the early eleventh century that is located in the village of Velanda, Trollhättan Municipality, Västra Götaland County, Sweden, which is in the historic province of Västergötland. It was discovered around 1910 by a farmer named Jacobsson.

== Description ==
The Velanda Runestone is inscribed in Old Norse with the Younger Futhark. Above the arch of the runic text band is the outline of an eagle's head facing to the left. The stone was raised by a woman named Þyrvé in memory of her husband Ögmundr. The runic inscription states that he was miok goðan þegn or "a very good thegn". About fifty other runestones refer to the deceased being a thegn. Of these, four use exactly the same phrase, miok goðan þegn: Vg 73 in Synnerby, Vg 108 in Tängs gamla, Vg 137 in Sörby, and DR 99 in Bjerregrav. The exact role of thegns in southern Sweden is a matter of debate, but the most common view is that they constituted an elite somehow connected to Danish power. It is thought that thegn-stones point to power centers from which they came, and from where they could be sent out to rule border areas in so-called tegnebyar.

The inscription asks the Norse pagan god Thor to hallow the runestone. One or two other runestones in Sweden have similar invocations to Thor: Ög 136 in Rök and possibly Sö 140 at Korpbron. Other runestones in Denmark that include invocations of or dedications to Thor in their inscriptions include DR 110 from Virring, DR 209 from Glavendrup, and DR 220 from Sønder Kirkeby. It has been noted that Thor is the only Norse god who is invoked on any Viking Age runestones.

== Inscription ==
A reading of the Velanda runestone's text in Old East Norse.

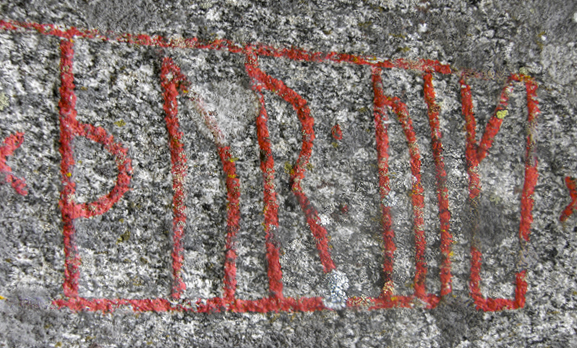
Runes × ᚦᚢᚱ ᛬ ᚢᛁᚴᛁ ×, meaning "may Þórr hallow" or thereof.

Younger Futhark	×	ᚦᚢᚱᚢᛁ	᛬	ᚱᛁᛋᚦᛁ	᛬	ᛋᛏᛁᚾ	᛬	ᛁᚠᛏᛁᛦ	᛬	ᚢᚴᛘᚢᛏ	᛬	ᛒᚢᛏᛅ	᛬	ᛋᛁᚾ	᛬	ᛘᛁᚢᚴ	᛬	ᚴᚢᚦᛅᚾ	᛬	ᚦᛁᚴᚾ	×	ᚦᚢᚱ	᛬	ᚢᛁᚴᛁ	×
Transliteration	×	þurui	:	risþi	:	stin	:	iftiʀ	:	ukmut	:	buta	:	sin	:	miuk	:	kuþan	:	þikn	×	þur	:	uiki	×
Runic Swedish		Þyrvi		ræisti		stæin		æftiʀ		Ogmund,		bonda		sinn		miok		goðan		þegn.		Þorr		vigi.
Literal translation		Torvi		raised		stone		after		Ögmund,		husband		hers,		a very		able		thegn.		Thor		hallow.
Modern English		Torvi erected this stone in memory of her husband Ögmund, a very able thegn. Praise Thor.

== Other sources ==
- Larsson, Mats G. (2002). Götarnas Riken : Upptäcktsfärder Till Sveriges Enande. Bokförlaget Atlantis AB ISBN 978-91-7486-641-4
