= Ergi =

Old Norse term of insult, denoting effeminacy or other unmanly behavior

Ergi (noun) and argr (adjective) are two Old Norse terms of insult, denoting cowardice, effeminacy, lewdness, or other behavior deemed unmanly. The terms have cognates in other Germanic languages, where the term is also strongly negative, allowing historical linguists to reconstruct its early Germanic predecessor, a strongly negative concept in early Germanic culture.

== Etymology ==
The Old Norse adjective argr (meaning 'unmanly, cowardly; lewd') and its cognates, including Old English earg (adjective, 'cowardly, timid'), Old Frisian erch (adjective 'evil, wrong'), Old High German arg, arag (adjective 'greedy, cowardly, worthless'), and Burgundian *args ('cowardly, mean') all derive from the Proto-Germanic adjective *arga-, *argaz meaning 'unmanly'. Other, later West Germanic cognates include Middle Low German arch (adjective 'angry, evil'), Middle Dutch arch, erch (adjective 'bad, evil, worthless') and subsequently Dutch erg (adjective 'bad').

From the Proto-Germanic adjective *arga-, *argaz developed the feminine Proto-Germanic noun *argīn, itself developing into the Old Norse noun ergi ('lewdness, lust') and the Old High German noun argī ('negligence, greed'). From *arga-, *argaz also developed the Proto-Germanic weak verb *argjanan, resulting in Old Norse ergjask ('to become a coward') and Middle High German gi-ergen 'to spoil, to destroy'.

== Historical usage ==
Ergi was associated not just with sorcery, unmanliness, weakness, and effeminacy but also especially with lecherousness in the view of Old Scandinavian people during the Early and High Middle Ages. Ergi of females (feminine adjective: ǫrg) was defined as excessive lecherousness or promiscuity, and of males as perversity, effeminacy and the passive role within same-sex intercourse between men.

=== Saleby Runestone ===
The adjective argr occurs on a Viking Age Younger Futhark runic inscription on runestone Vg 67 in Saleby, Sweden. The inscription includes a curse that anyone breaking the stone would become a rata, translated by Rundata as a 'wretch', 'outcast', or 'warlock', and argri konu (dative), which is translated by Rundata as 'maleficent woman'. Here argri appears to be related to the practice of seiðr and represents the most loathsome term the runemaster could imagine calling someone.

=== Grey Goose Laws ===
To accuse another man of being argr was called scolding (see nīþ) and thus a legal reason to challenge the accuser in hólmganga. If hólmganga was refused by the accused, he could be outlawed (full outlawry) as this refusal proved that the accuser was right and the accused was argr. Being proven to be an ergi or niðing was generally punished by becoming an outlaw in surviving law codes. If the accused fought successfully in hólmganga and had thus proven that he was not argr, the scolding was considered what was in Old English called eacan, an unjustified, severe defamation, and the accuser had to pay the offended party full compensation. The Gray Goose Laws, from the Icelandic Commonwealth period, states:

There are three words—should exchanges between people ever reach such dire limits—which all have full outlawry as the penalty; if a man calls another ragr, stroðinn or sorðinn. As they are to be prosecuted like other fullréttisorð and, what is more, a man has the right to kill in retaliation for these three words. He has the right to kill in retaliation on their account over the same period as he has the right to kill on account of women, in both cases up the next General Assembly. The man who utters these words falls with forfeit immunity at the hands of anyone who accompanies the man about whom they were uttered to the place of their encounter.

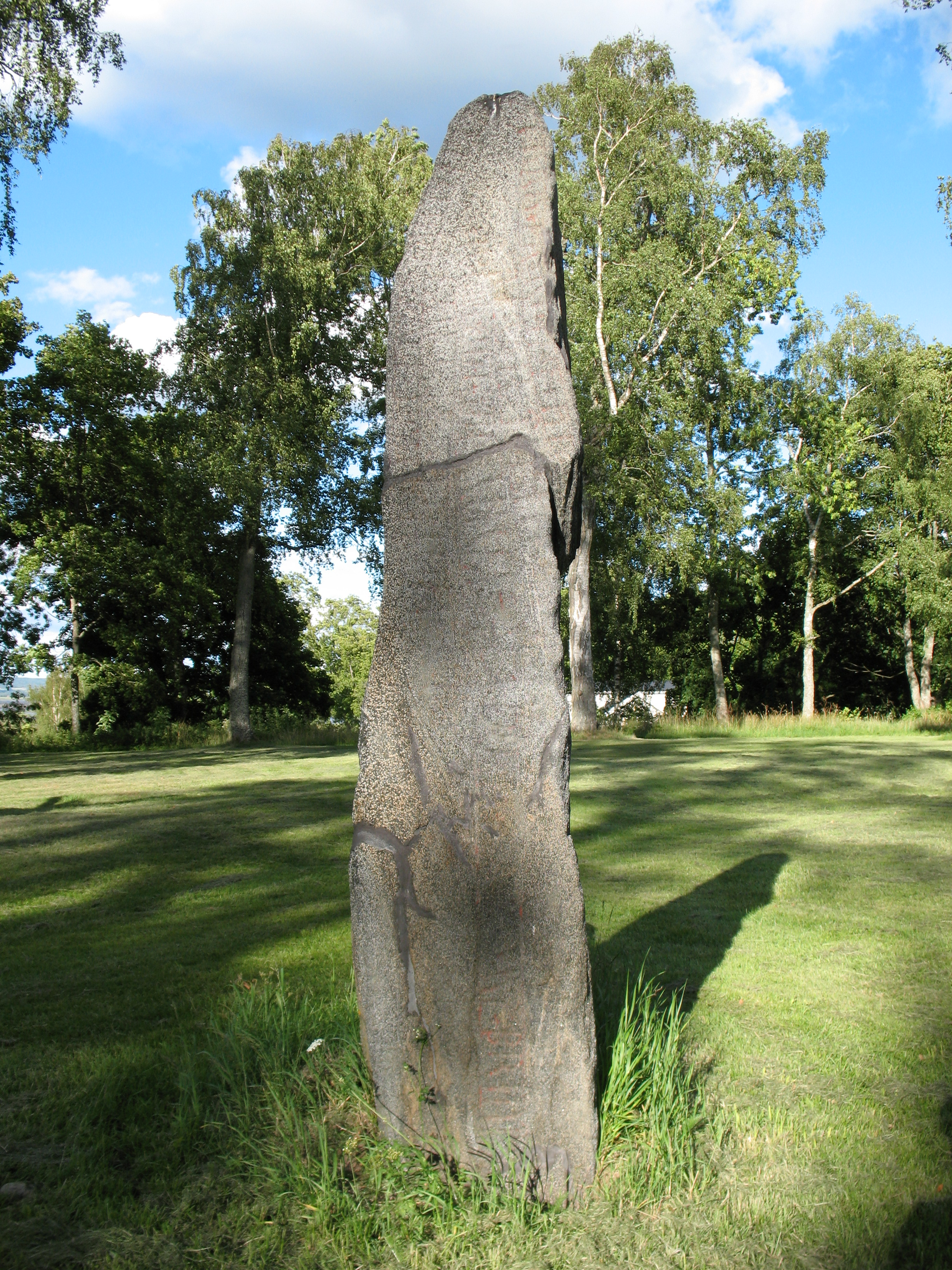
The Saleby Runestone uses the term argri konu in a curse.

The three words in the Grey Goose Laws that were regarded as equal to argr referred to the passive role of a man in sexual activities, being womanly, and being subservient.

== Modern usage ==
Some adherents of modern Heathenry, a new religious movement, use "ergi" as either an insult for queer men, male seiðr practitioners, or those perceived as "unmanly". Correspondingly, some male seiðr practitioners have reclaimed the word ergi. One male seiðr practitioner from Scotland who was interviewed by researchers noted that "ergi" was still used where he lived by the general public to refer to a man perceived as cowardly.

== See also ==
- Malakia (μαλακία, Ancient Greek)
