= Sønder Vinge runestone 2 =

Viking Age runestone

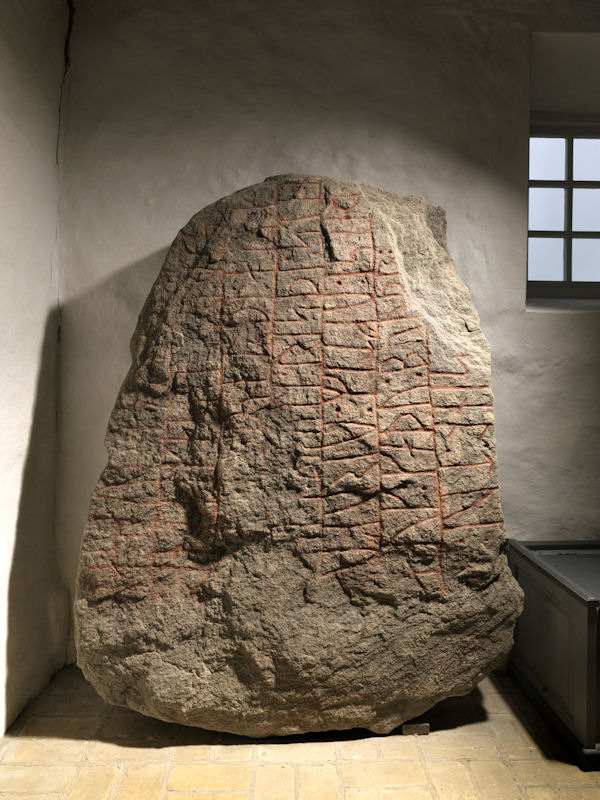
DR 83

The Sønder Vinge stone 2 or DR 83 is a Viking Age runestone engraved in Old Norse with the Younger Futhark runic alphabet. The stone is in granite and was discovered in 1866 as a corner stone of Sønder Vinge Church, positioned with the runic inscription outwards. It is presently located in the porch of the church. It is probably from the period 970-1020 due to runic and linguistic features. It is 180 cm tall, 132 cm wide and 35 cm thick. Parts of the runic inscription have eroded which makes some runes hard to read. The style of the runestone is the runestone style RAK.

The inscription ends with a curse similar to the ones found on the Saleby Runestone and Glemminge stone in Sweden, and on Tryggevælde and the Glavendrup runestones in Denmark. However, the interpretation of the curse as well as meaning of the word ræti ("warlock") are contested.

== Inscription ==
-u(þ)(i) : b(i)--(l)i : risþi : stin ¶ : þensi : uftiʀ : uruku ¶ auk : kaþu : bruþr : ¶ sino : tuo : ¶ ... sarþi : auk ¶ siþ : r(a)(t)i : saʀ : monr : ¶ ias : auþi : mini : þui
[G]uði {} <bi--li> {} resþi {} sten {} {} þænsi {} æftiʀ {} Urøkiu {} ok {} Kaþu, {} brøþr {} {} sina {} twa {} {} ... særþi {} ok {} seþ. {} Ræti(?) {} saʀ {} mannr {} {} æs {} øþi {} minni {} þwi.
"Guði <bi--li> raised this stone in memory of Órókia and Kaða, his two brothers ... wounded and bewitched(?). A warlock(?) (be) the man who destroys this memorial!"

(a)u(þ)(i) : bruti : risþi : stin ¶ : þensi : uftiʀ : uruku ¶ auk : kaþu : bruþr : ¶ sino : tuo : ¶ ... sarþi : auk ¶ siþ:riti : saʀ : monr : ¶ ias : auþi : mini : þui
Øþi {} Bryti {} resþi {} sten {} {} þænsi {} æftiʀ {} Urøkiu {} ok {} Kaþu, {} brøþr {} {} sina {} twa {} {} [werþi] særþi {} ok {} seþretti(?) {} saʀ {} mannr {} {} æs {} øþi {} minni {} þwi.
"Auði Steward raised this stone in memory of Órókia and Kaða, his two brothers. [May he be considered] a pervert and a wizard(?), that man who destroys this memorial."
