= Glemminge stone =

Runestone in Sweden

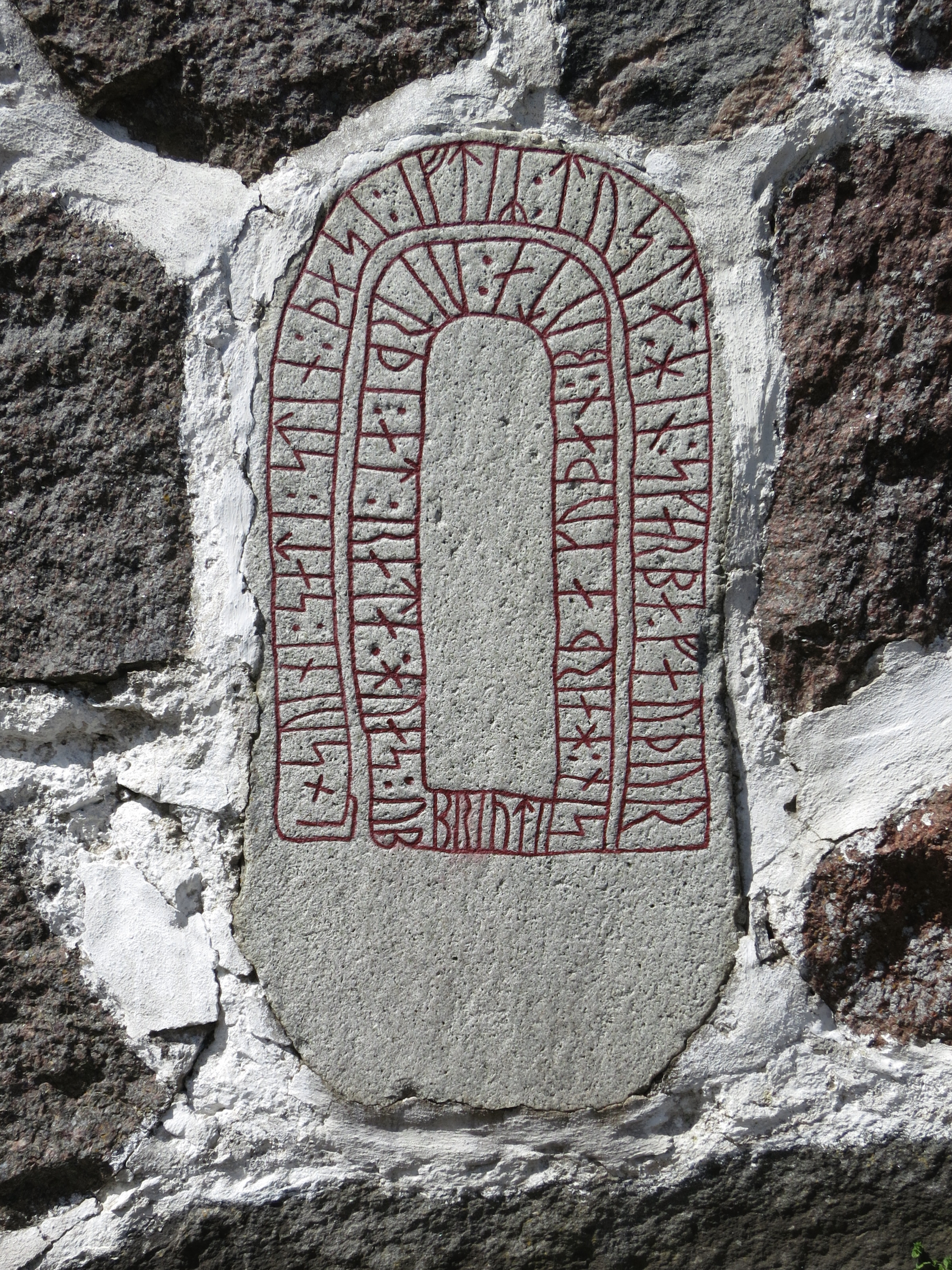
DR 338

The Glemminge stone or DR 338 is a Viking Age runestone engraved in Old Norse with the Younger Futhark runic alphabet. It is found in the wall of Glimminge church in Scania, in Ystad Municipality in Sweden. The style of the runestone is the runestone style RAK.

The inscription ends with a curse similar to the ones found on the Saleby Runestone in Västergötland, Sweden and on the Sønder Vinge runestone 2, the Tryggevælde and the Glavendrup runestones in Denmark. However, the meaning of the word ræti ("warlock") is contested.

== Inscription ==
× suini : sati : stin : þasi : iftiR : tusta : hin : skarba : fauþur ¶ sin : harþa : kuþan : buta : uirþi : at : rata : huas : ub ¶ briuti
{} Sweni {} satti {} sten {} þæssi {} æftiR {} Tosta {} hin {} Skarpa, {} faþur {} sin, {} harþa {} goþan {} bonda. {} Wærþi {} at {} ræta(?) {} hwas {} of {} briuti.
"Sveini placed this stone in memory of Tosti the Sharp, his father, a very good husbandman. May whosoever breaks (it) become a warlock!"
