= Källby Runestones =

Two Viking age memorial runestones

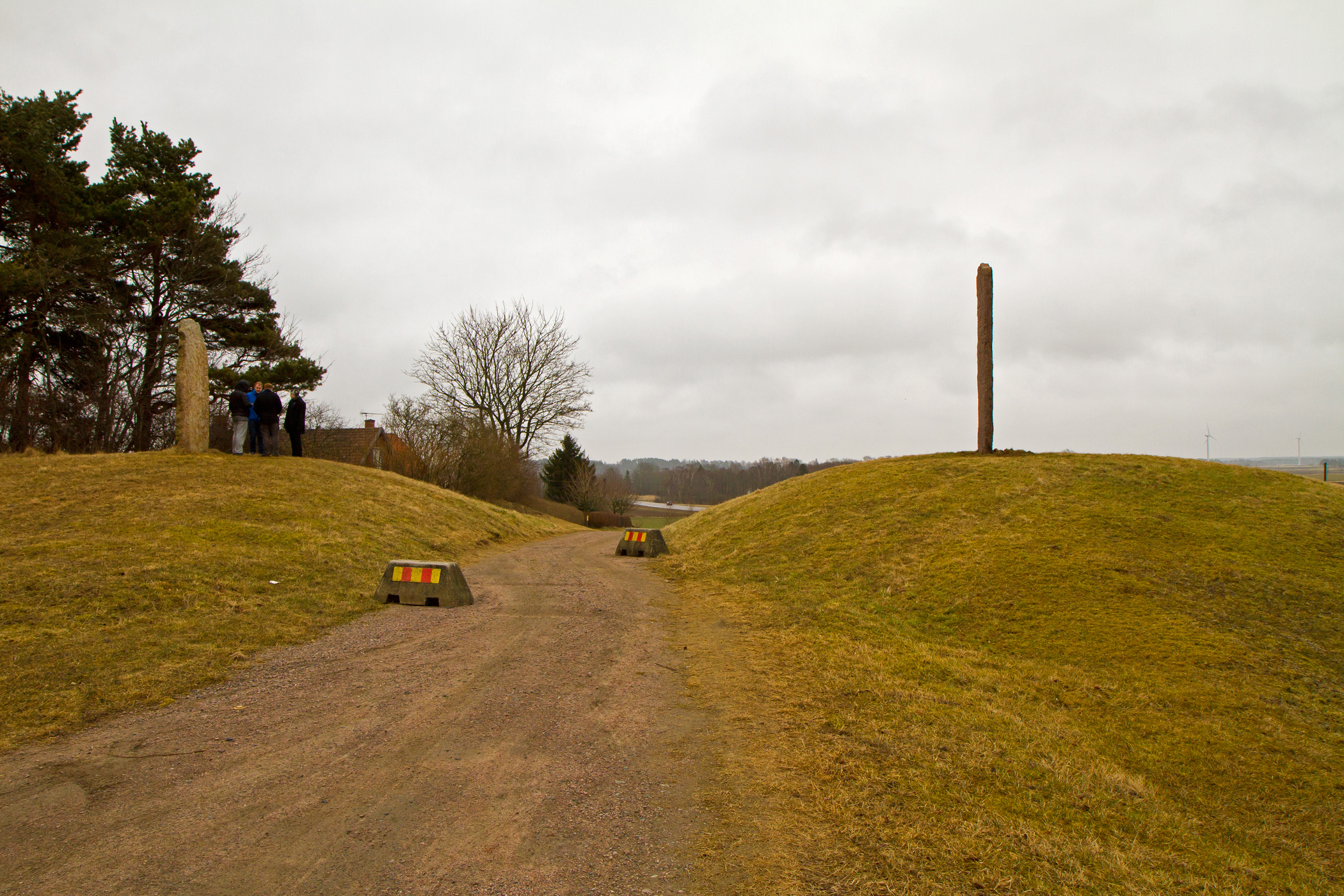
The two Källby runestones facing each other. March 2012.

The Källby Runestones are two Viking Age memorial runestones located in Källby, Västra Götaland County, Sweden, which was in the historic province of Västergötland.

== Vg 55 ==
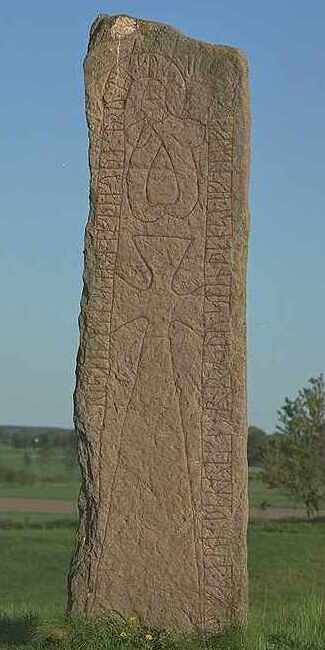
Vg 55

Västergötland Runic Inscription 55 or Vg 55 is the Rundata designation for an inscription consisting of runic text in the younger futhark inscribed on two serpents that frame a cross. The inscription, which is on a sandstone stone that is 4.4 meters in height, is classified as being carved in Runestone style Pr2, which is also known as Ringerike style. This is the classification for inscriptions where the text bands have attached serpent heads depicted as seen from above. Vg 55 has been known since the Swedish runestone surveys of the 16th century, and was described by Ole Worm in 1555. Although carved in sandstone, an inspection in 1995–96 found that 84% of the runes were intact.

The runic text states that the stone was raised by two sons named Ulfr and Ragnarr in memory of their father Fari, who is described as being a Christian and having "good belief in God". The inscription has been noted as evidence of the influence of Christian ethics on the meaning of "good" in Viking Age Sweden.

=== Inscription ===
==== Transliteration of the runes into Latin characters ====
ulfʀ : auk : þiʀ : ra(k)nar : risþu : stin : þansi : iftiʀ : fara : faþur sin : ... ...ristin : man : saʀ : hafþi : kuþa : tru : til : kus :

==== Transcription into Old Norse ====
Ulfʀ ok þæiʀ Ragnarr ræistu stæin þannsi æftiʀ Fara, faður sinn ... [k]ristinn mann, saʀ hafði goða tro til Guðs.

==== Translation in English ====
Ulfr and Ragnarr, they raised this stone in memory of Fari, their father ... Christian man. He had good belief in God.

== Vg 56 ==
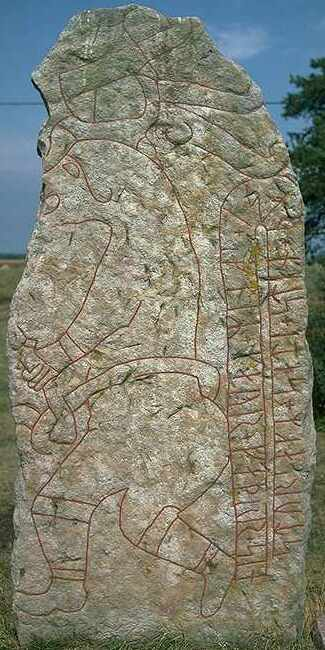
Vg 56 in Källby.

Västergötland Runic Inscription 56 or Vg 56 is the Rundata listing for an inscription consisting of runic text in the younger futhark carved in two text bands on the right edge of a sandstone stone 3.1 meters in height that depicts the figure of a man holding a stick and wearing a large belt and headdress with antlers. Because of the belt, the figure has sometimes been identified as the Norse pagan god Thor, who has a belt called Megingjörð that increases his strength. Another suggestion is that the figure represents the man memorialized in the runic text who is depicted in shaman attire performing a ritual. The stone was originally located at Skavums, and was moved to its current location across the road from Vg 55 in 1669.

The runic text states that the stone was raised by a man named either Styrlakr or Styrlaugr in memory of his father, who was named Kárr. It has been suggested that the father's name Kárr, which is Old Norse for "lock of hair" or "curly hair," was a name associated with cultic initiates who grew long hair, and supports an identification of the figure on the inscription as being that of the father in ritual attire. The name Kárr was often combined with that of Odin in Óðinkárr, and appears in a possible cultic initiate reference in the names on inscriptions on DR 4 in Hedeby, DR 81 in Skjern, DR 133 in Skivum, and DR 239 in Gørlev. The text on Vg 73 in Synnerby has a man named Kárr whose father has a name that means he may have been a priest or chieftain with religious duties. The name Kárr is also used without necessarily any cultic reference in inscriptions Sm 90 in Torshag, Sö 128 in Lids, U 643 and U 644 in Ekilla bro, U 654 in Varpsund, and U 792 in Ulunda, with U 644 and U 654 referring to the same person.

=== Inscription ===
==== Transliteration of the runes into Latin characters ====
stur-akʀ + sati + stin + þasi + (i)ftiʀ + kaur + faþur + sin

==== Transcription into Old Norse ====
Styr[l]akʀ/Styr[l]augr satti stæin þannsi æftiʀ <kaur>, faður sinn.

==== Translation in English ====
Styrlakr/Styrlaugr placed this stone in memory of <kaur>, his father.
