= Saleby Runestone =

Coordinates: 58.2850°N 13.4905°E

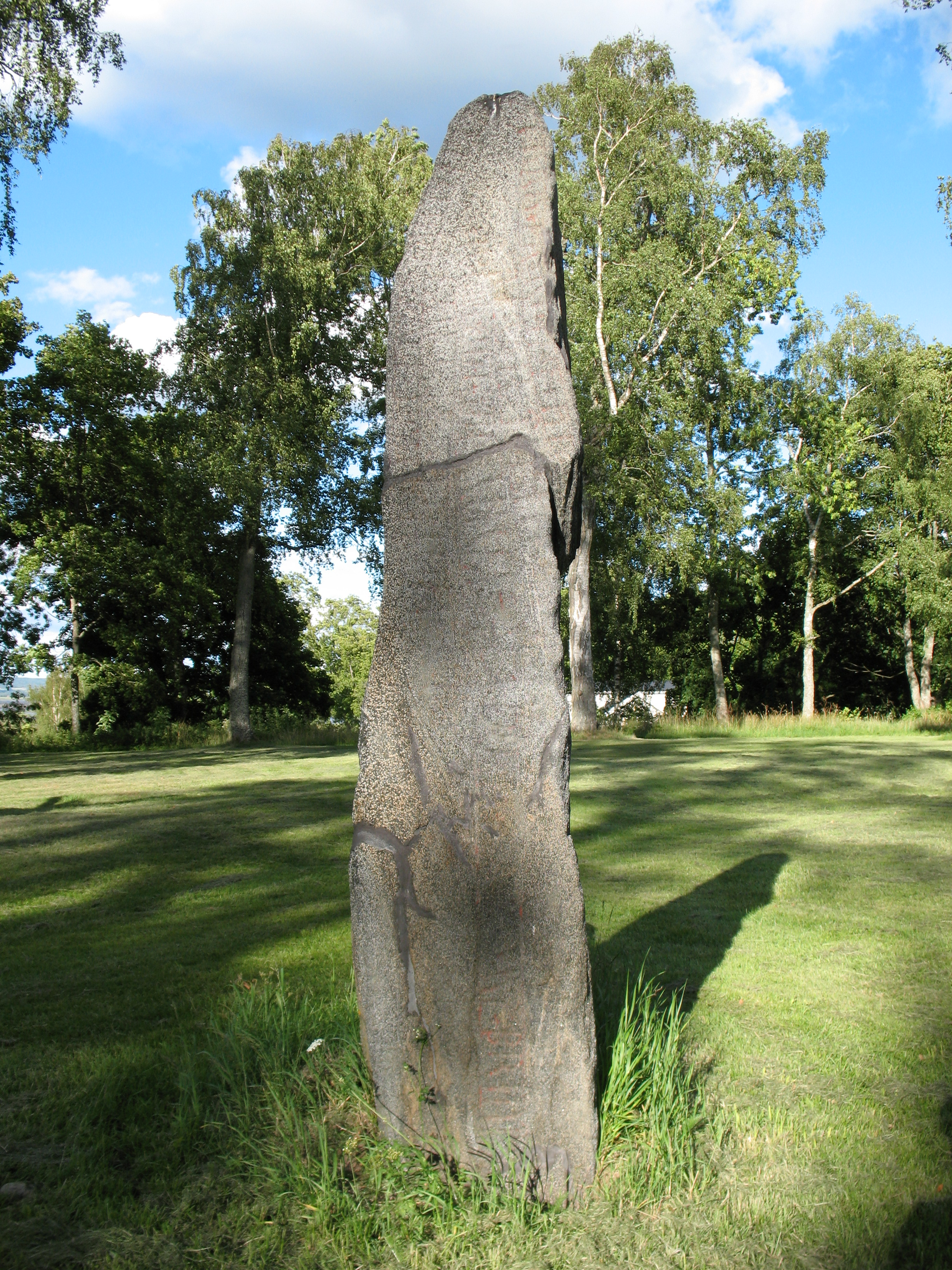
The Saleby runestone at Dagsnäs.

The Saleby Runestone, designated as Vg 67 in the Rundata catalog, was originally located in Saleby, Västra Götaland County, Sweden, which is in the historic province of Västergötland, and is one of the few runestones that is raised in memory of a woman.

== Description ==
The runic inscription and is classified as being in runestone style RAK. This is the classification for inscriptions where the runic bands do not have any serpent or beast heads at the ends, and is considered to be the oldest style. The Saleby Runestone was discovered in 1794 within the walls of the church of Saleby and then moved to its current location near Dagsnäs Castle. The stone is 2.7 metres in height and about 0.45 meters in width.

The runic text states that the stone was raised by Freysteinn as a memorial to his wife Þóra, who is described as being "the best of her generation." The inscription ends with a curse on anyone who destroys the memorial. A similar curse also appears on the Glemminge stone in Sweden, and the Sønder Vinge runestone 2, the Tryggevælde Runestone and the Glavendrup stone in Denmark. There is some disagreement regarding the translation of one of the words in these curses, rita/rata, which has been translated as "wretch", "outcast", or "warlock". Warlock is the translation accepted by Rundata. However, the use of warlock is not that the destroyer would gain any magical powers, but be considered to be unnatural and a social outcast. The inscription also uses the Old Norse word kona or konu, which translates as "woman", in two different ways, showing that the meaning of the word depended on its context. The first use of konu is to refer to Þóra as Freysteinn's wife. The second is in the phrase argʀi konu or "maleficent woman" in the curse, which appears to be related to the practice of seiðr, a type of sorcery. Runologist Erik Moltke has suggested that argʀi represents the most loathsome term the runemaster could imagine calling someone. The idea that a warlock or sorcerer was an evil perversion predated the conversion of Scandinavia to Christianity.

The text is carved in the younger futhark and contains one bind rune, which is a ligature of two runes. On Vg 67 the runemaster combined a u-rune with a k-rune in the word au=k ("and").

Both of the personal names in the inscription have names of Norse pagan gods as an element of the name. Freysteinn means "Freyr's Stone" and Þóra is a female diminutive form of Thor.

== Inscription ==
+ fraustin + karþi + kubl * þausi + aftiʀ + þuru + kunu + sino + su ... ...(s) + tutiʀ bast + miþ + altum + uarþi at + rata + au=k + at arkʀi '+ kunu + saʀ + ias haukui + krus + -... + uf + briuti
{} Frøystæinn {} gærði {} kumbl {} þausi {} æftiʀ {} Þoru, {} konu {} sina. {} Su [va]ʀ ... {} dottiʀ, bæzt {} með {} aldum. {} Verði at {} <rata> {} ok {} at argʀi {} konu {} saʀ {} es haggvi [i] krus, {} ... {} of {} briuti.
Freysteinn made these monuments in memory of Þóra, his wife. She was ... daughter, the best of her generation. May he who cuts to pieces ... breaks ... become a warlock and a maleficent woman ...
