= Tryggevælde Runestone =

Runestone at the National Museum of Denmark

Coordinates: 55.6749°N 12.5756°E

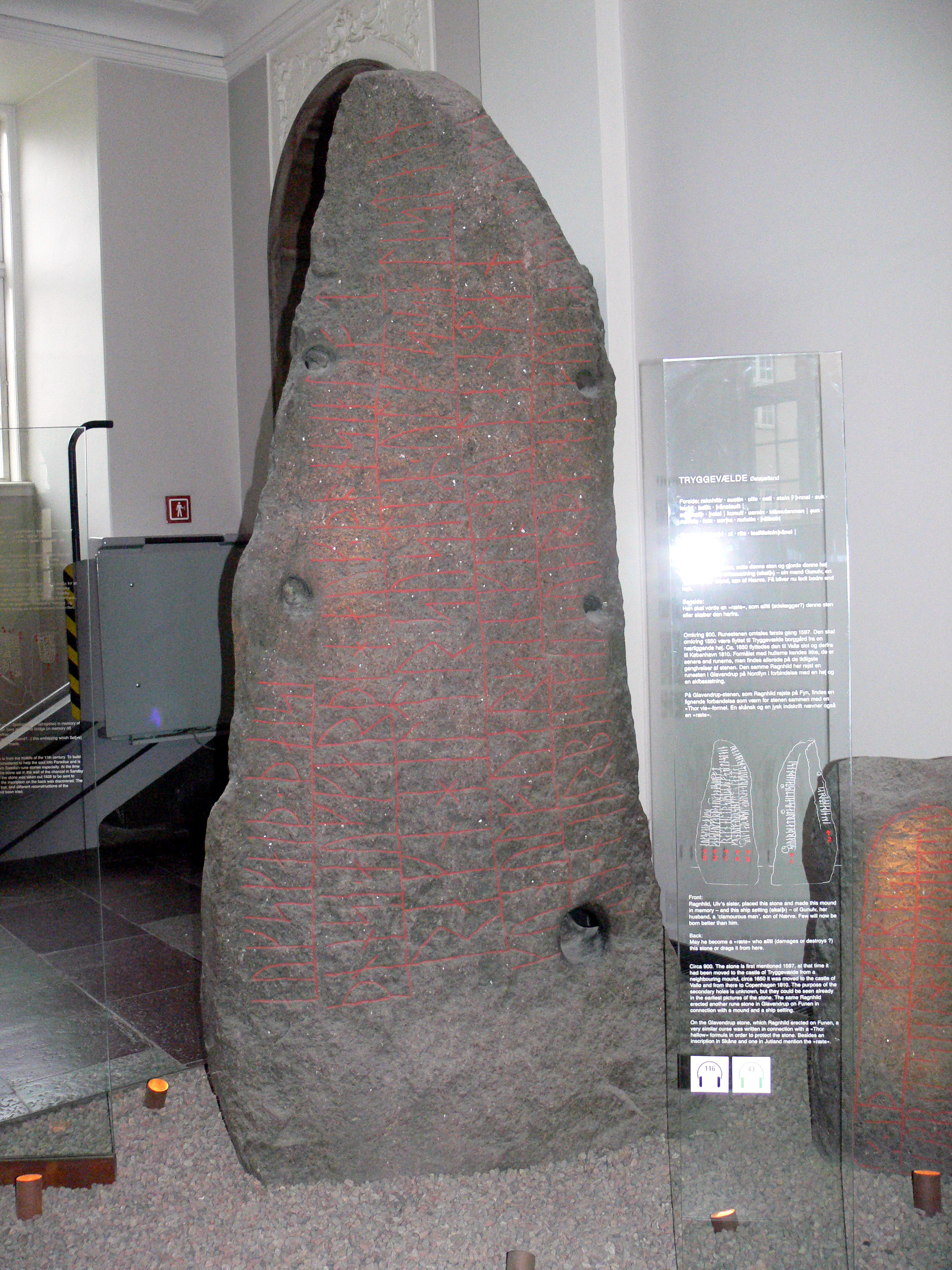
Inscriptions A and B.

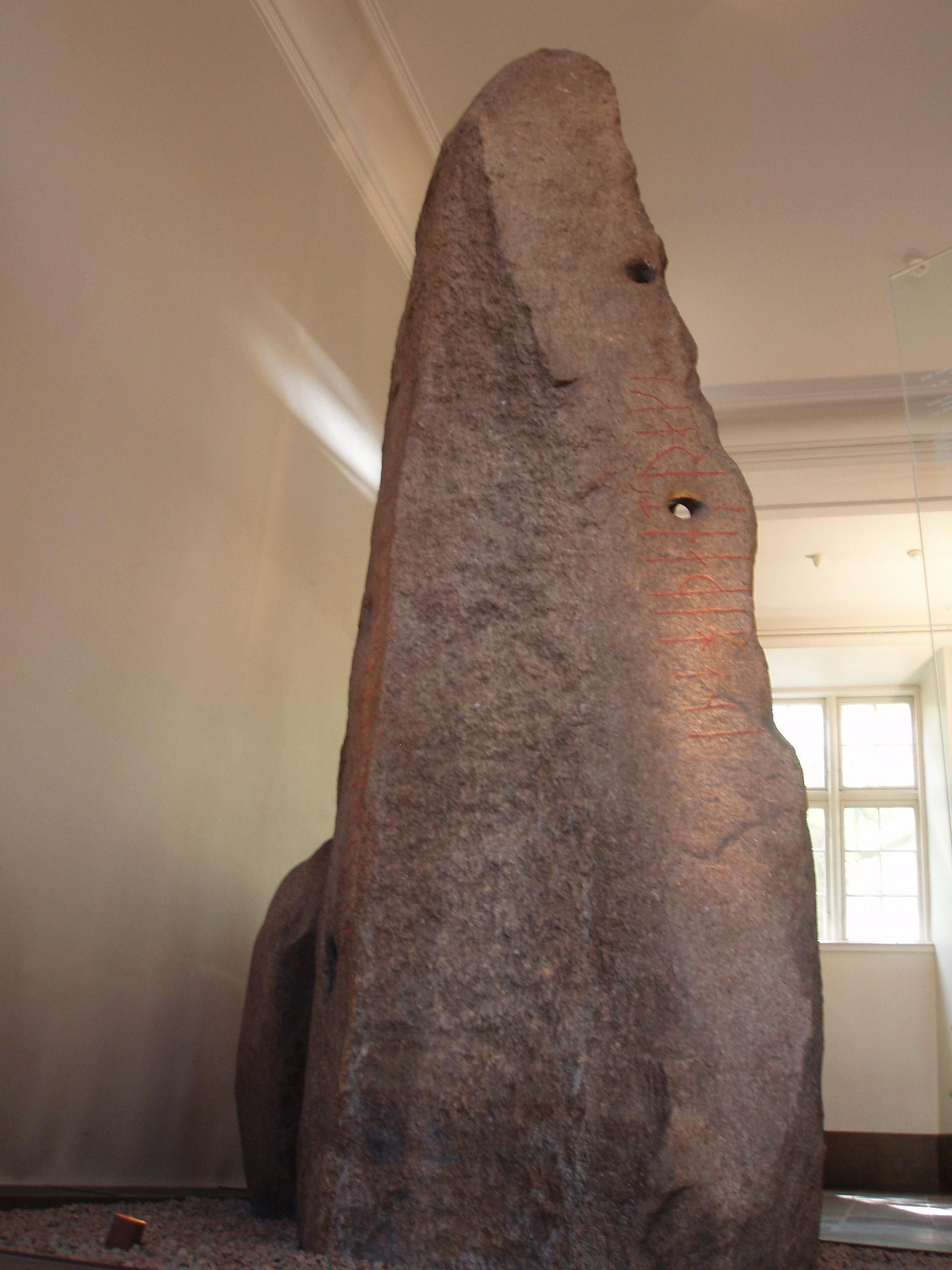
Inscription C.

Tryggevælde Runestone, designated as DR 230 under Rundata, is a runestone housed in the National Museum of Denmark, in Copenhagen. It is classified as being carved in runestone style RAK, and is dated to about 900 AD.

== Description ==
In 1555, the runestone was moved from a barrow to the Tryggevælde estate on Zealand. It came to Copenhagen in 1810.

There are several holes on the runestone, but no one knows why. Ragnhild, who raised the runestone, also had Glavendrup stone (DR 209) made after another husband named Alle. That runestone is located at a barrow and a stone ship in Glavendrup on the island of Funen. Both the Glavendrup and Tryggevælde runestones were made by the same runemaster, Sote.

The inscription ends with a curse against anyone who would destroy or move the runestone that is similar to the ones found on the Glavendrup stone the Sønder Vinge runestone 2 and the Glemminge stone and the Saleby Runestone in Sweden. There is some disagreement regarding the translation of one of the words in these curses, rita/rata, which has been translated as 'wretch,' 'outcast,' or 'warlock.' Warlock is the translation accepted by Rundata. However, the use of warlock is not that the destroyer would gain any magical powers, but be considered to be unnatural and a social outcast. The concept that being a warlock or sorcerer was an evil perversion predated the conversion of Scandinavia to Christianity.

This inscription is the first mention of the Old Scandinavian ship type skeið.

== Inscription ==
The lines:

1. Transliteration of the runes into Latin characters
2. Transcription into standardized Old Norse
3. Transcription into standardized Old Danish

raknhiltr ' sustiʀ ' ulfs ' sati ' stain ¶ þnnsi ' auk ' karþi ' hauk ' þonsi auft ¶ auk skaiþ ' þaisi ¶ kunulf ' uar sin ' klomulan man ¶ (s)un ' nairbis ' faiʀ ' uarþa ' nu futiʀ ' þoi batri
Ragnhildr, {} systir {} Ulfs, {} setti {} stein {} þenna {} ok {} gerði {} haug {} þenna ept, {} ok skeið {} þessa, {} Gunnulf, {} ver sinn, {} glômulan mann, {} son {} Nerfis. {} Fáir {} verða {} nú fœddir {} þeim betri.
Ragnhildr, {} systiʀ {} Ulfs, {} satti {} sten {} þænsi {} ok {} gærþi {} høg {} þænsi æft, {} ok skeþ {} þæssi, {} Gunulf, {} wær sin, {} glamulan man, {} sun {} Nærfis. {} Faiʀ {} wærþa {} nu føddiʀ {} þem bætri.
Ragnhildr, Ulfr's sister, placed this stone and made this mound, and this ship(-setting), in memory of her husband Gunnulfr, a clamorous man, Nerfir's son. Few will now be born better than him.

sa uarþi ' at (') rita ' is ailti stain þonsi
Sá verði {} at {} réta(?) {} er elti(?) stein þenna
Sa wærþi {} at {} ræta(?) {} æs ælti(?) sten þænsi
A warlock(?) be he who damages(?) this stone

iþa hiþan traki
eða heðan dragi.
æþa hæþan dragi.
or drags it (away) from here.
