= Glavendrup stone =

Runestone on Funen Island, Denmark

Coordinates: 55°30′32″N 10°17′51″E

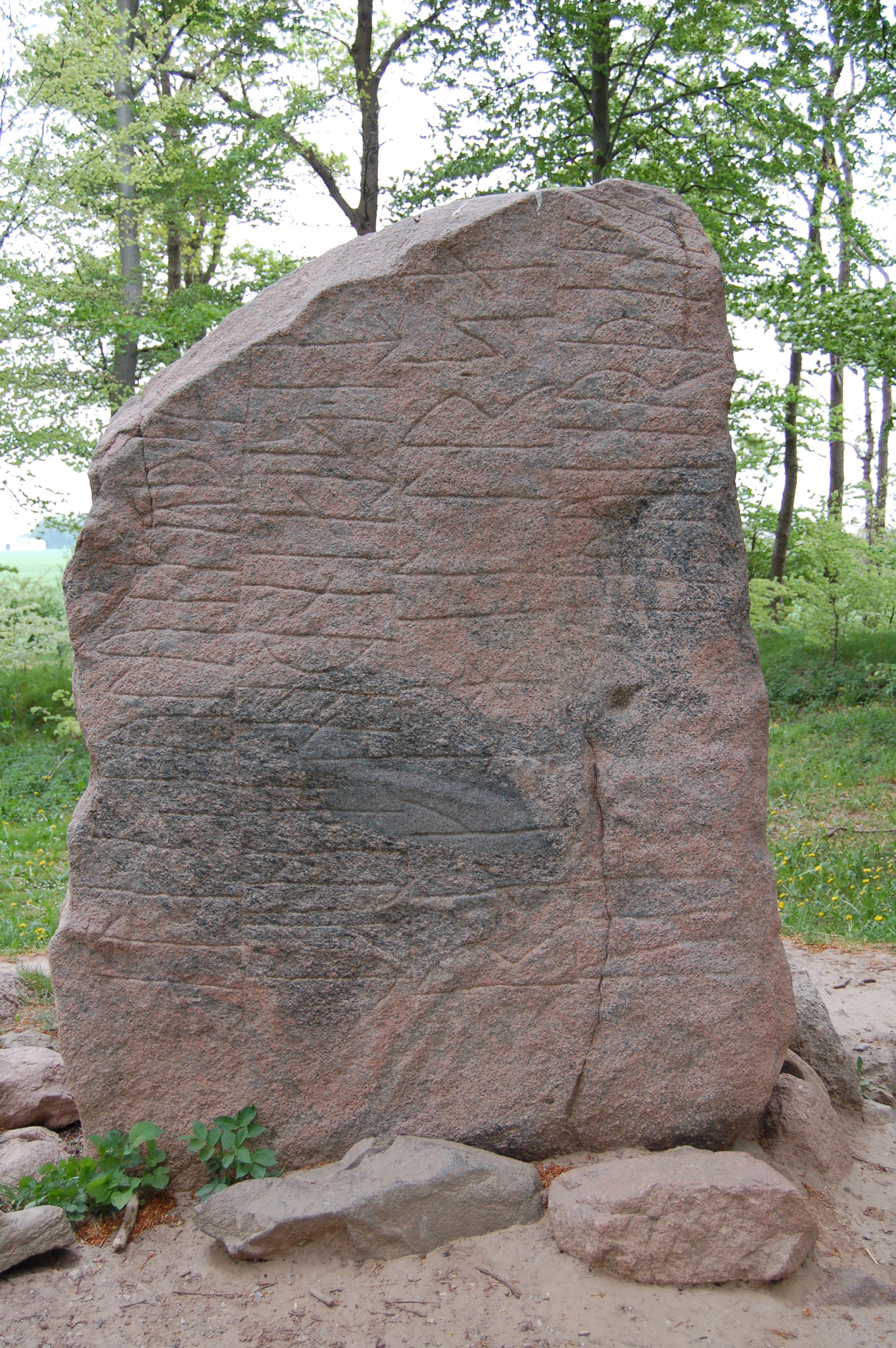
The front of the Glavendrup stone.

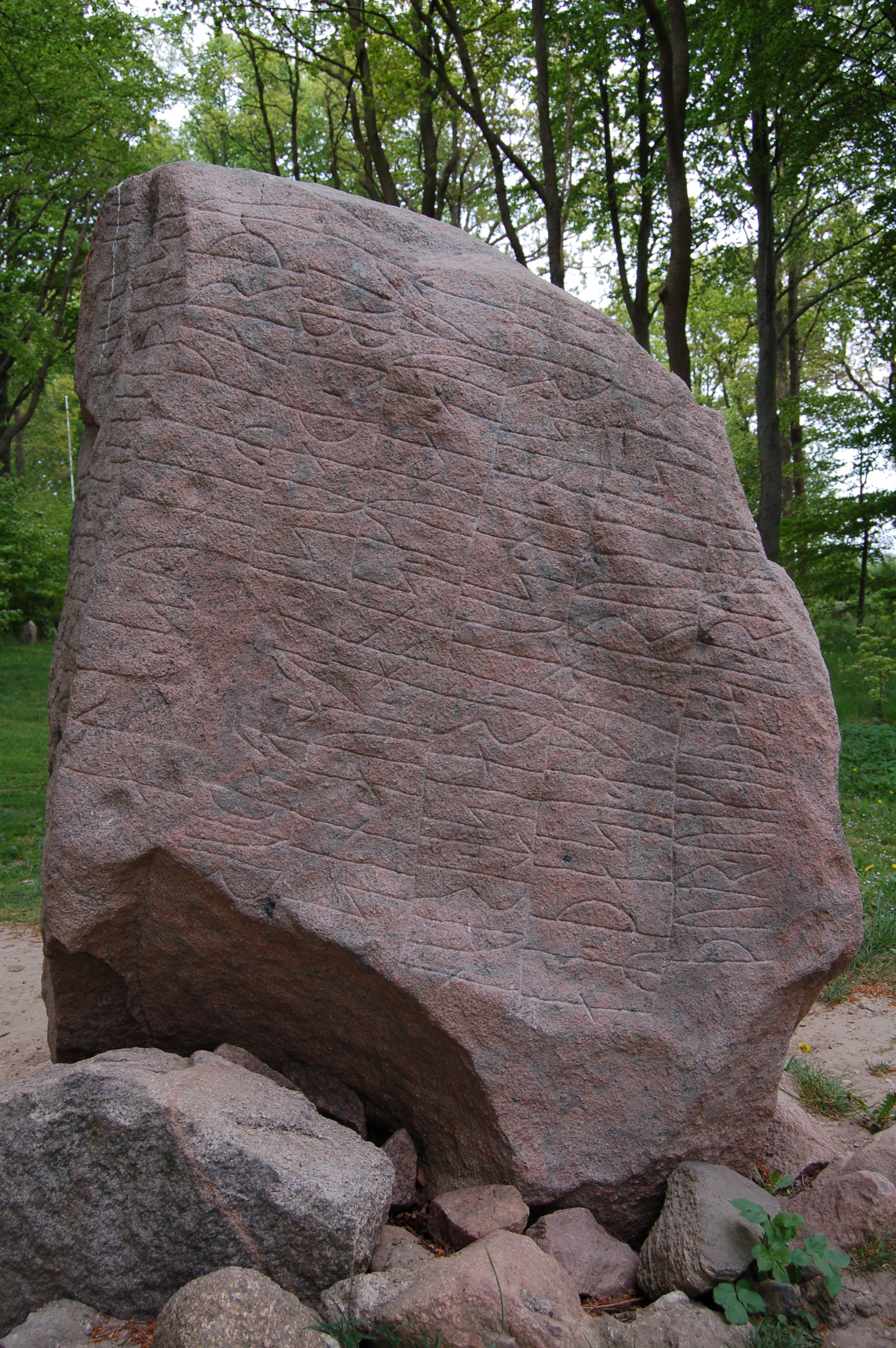
The back of the stone.

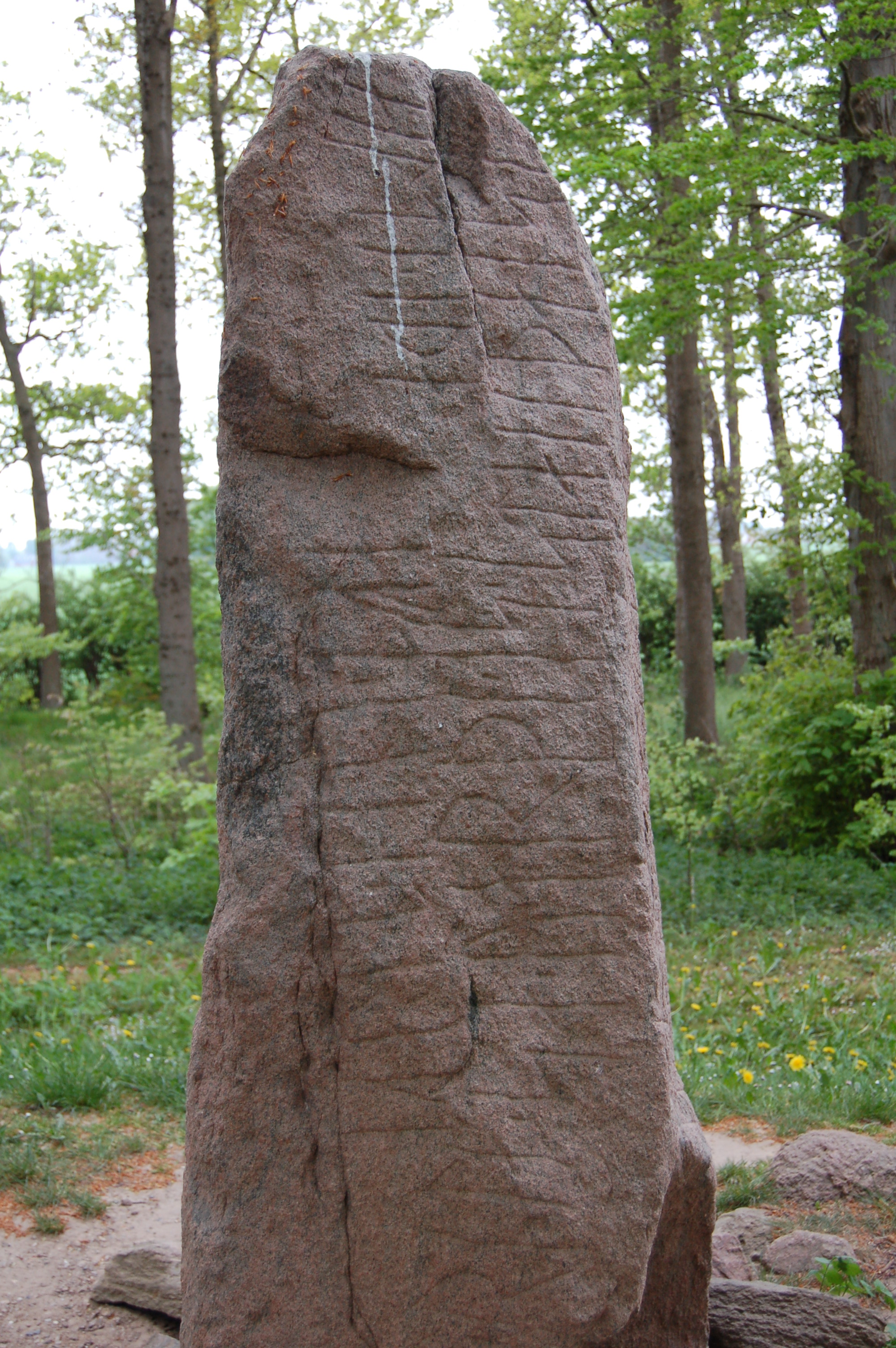
One of the sides of the stone.

The Glavendrup stone, designated as DR 209 by Rundata, is a runestone on the island of Funen in Denmark and dates from the early 10th century. It contains Denmark's longest runic inscription and ends in a curse.

== Description ==
The runestone forms the end of a stone ship. There are other megaliths in the vicinity, including memorial stones with Latin characters from the early 20th century. In the stone ship, nine graves have been found, but they were all empty.

The runestone was discovered when sand was quarried in the area in 1794, and it was saved in 1808 by the archaeologist Vedel Simonssen when stonemasons wanted to buy it. The last restoration was made in 1958, and the mound it is standing on is modern.

Ragnhild who ordered the stone also ordered the Tryggevælde Runestone (DR 230) from the runemaster Soti. The runic inscription is classified as being in runestone style RAK. This is the classification for inscriptions with text bands with straight ends that do not have attached serpent or beast heads. It refers to a gothi, who was a pagan priest of a vé, a holy sanctuary, and a thegn, who was the head of the Norse clan and a warchief. The rune carver appeals to the Norse god Thor to hallow the inscription. There are two other runestones that have similar invocations to Thor located in Denmark, DR 110 from Virring and DR 220 from Sønder Kirkeby, and three other stones in Sweden, Ög 136 in Rök, Vg 150 from Velanda and possibly Sö 140 at Korpbron. It has been noted that Thor is the only Norse god who is invoked on any Viking Age runestones.

The inscription ends with a curse, similar to the ones found on the Tryggevælde Runestone and the Sønder Vinge runestone 2 in Denmark and the Glemminge stone and the Saleby Runestone in Sweden. There is some disagreement regarding the translation of one of the words in these curses, rita/rata, which has been translated as "wretch," "outcast," or "warlock." Warlock is the translation accepted by Rundata. However, the use of warlock is not that the destroyer would gain any magical powers, but be considered to be unnatural and a social outcast. The concept that being a warlock or sorcerer was an evil perversion predated the Christian conversion of Scandinavia.

== Inscription ==
raknhiltr ' sa¶ti ' stain þonsi ' auft ¶ ala ' saulua kuþa ¶ uia l(i)þs haiþuiarþan þia¶kn
Ragnhildr {} satti {} sten þænsi {} æft {} Alla {} Solwa, goþa {} wea, liþs heþwærþan þægn.
Ragnhildr placed this stone in memory of Alli the Pale, priest of the sanctuary, honourable þegn of the retinue.

raknhiltr ' sa¶ti ' stain þonsi ' auft ¶ ala ' saulua kuþa ¶ uial(i)þs haiþuiarþan þia¶kn
Ragnhildr {} satti {} sten þænsi {} æft {} Alla, {} salvia goþa, {} vialiþs heþwærþan þægn.
Ragnhildr placed this stone in memory of Alli, priest of the Sølve, honourable þegn of the sanctuary-retinue.

ala ' suniʀ ' karþu ¶ kubl ' þausi ' aft ' faþur ¶ sin ' auk ' hons ' kuna ' auft ¶ uar ' sin ' in ' suti ' raist ' run¶aʀ ' þasi ' aft ' trutin ' sin ¶ þur ' uiki ' þasi ' runaʀ
Alla {} syniʀ {} gærþu {} kumbl {} þøsi {} æft {} faþur {} sin {} ok {} hans {} kona {} æft {} wær {} sin. {} Æn {} Soti {} rest {} runaʀ {} þæssi {} æft {} drottin {} sin. {} Þor {} wigi {} þæssi {} runaʀ.
Alli's sons made this monument in memory of their father, and his wife in memory of her husband. And Sóti carved these runes in memory of his lord. Þórr hallow these runes.

at ' rita ' sa ' uarþi ' is ' stain þansi ¶ ailti ' iþa aft ' onon ' traki
At {} ræta(?) {} sa {} wærþi {} æs {} sten þænsi {} ælti(?) {} æþa æft {} annan {} dragi.
A warlock be he who damages(?) this stone or drags it (to stand) in memory of another.

== Gallery ==
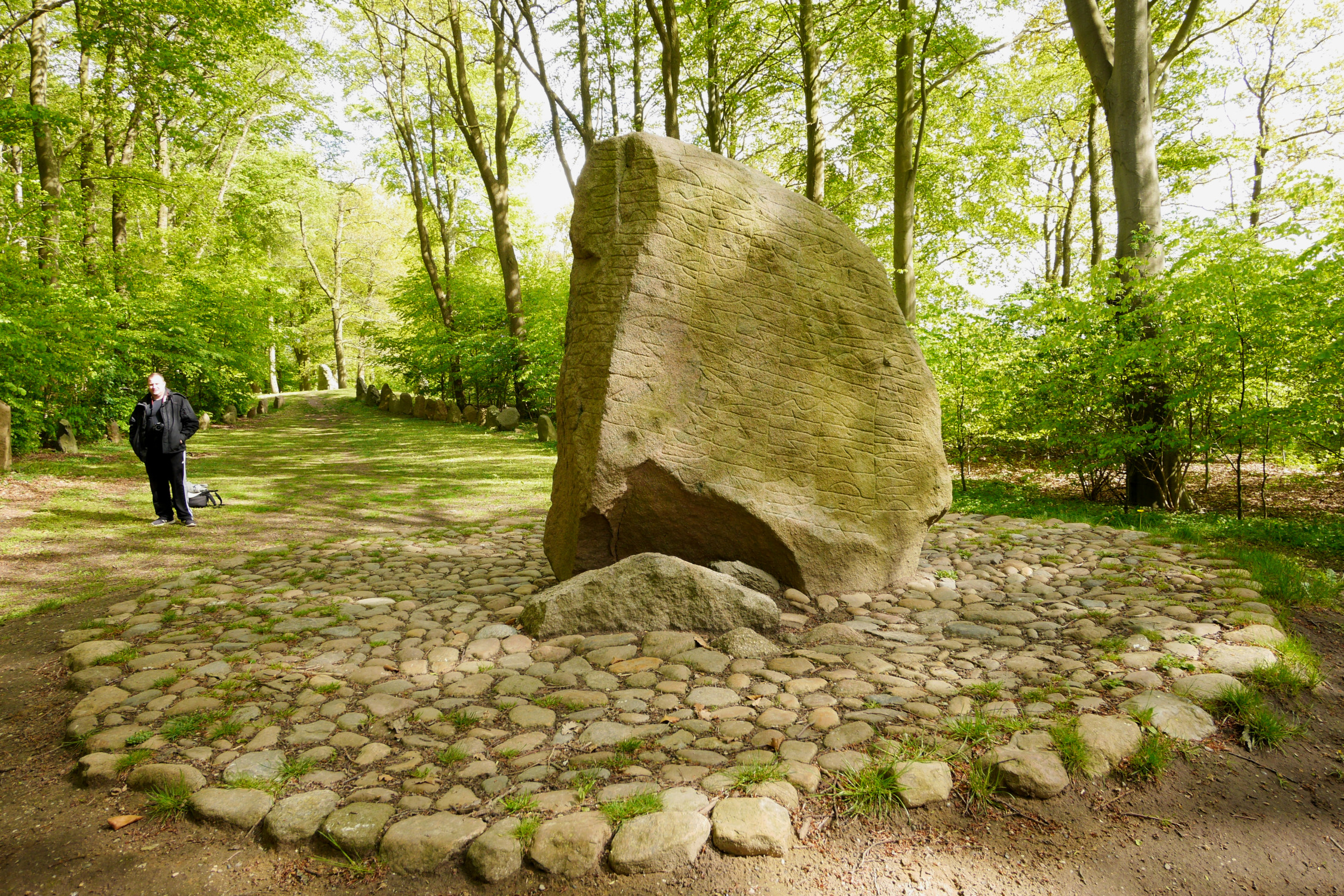
Runestone

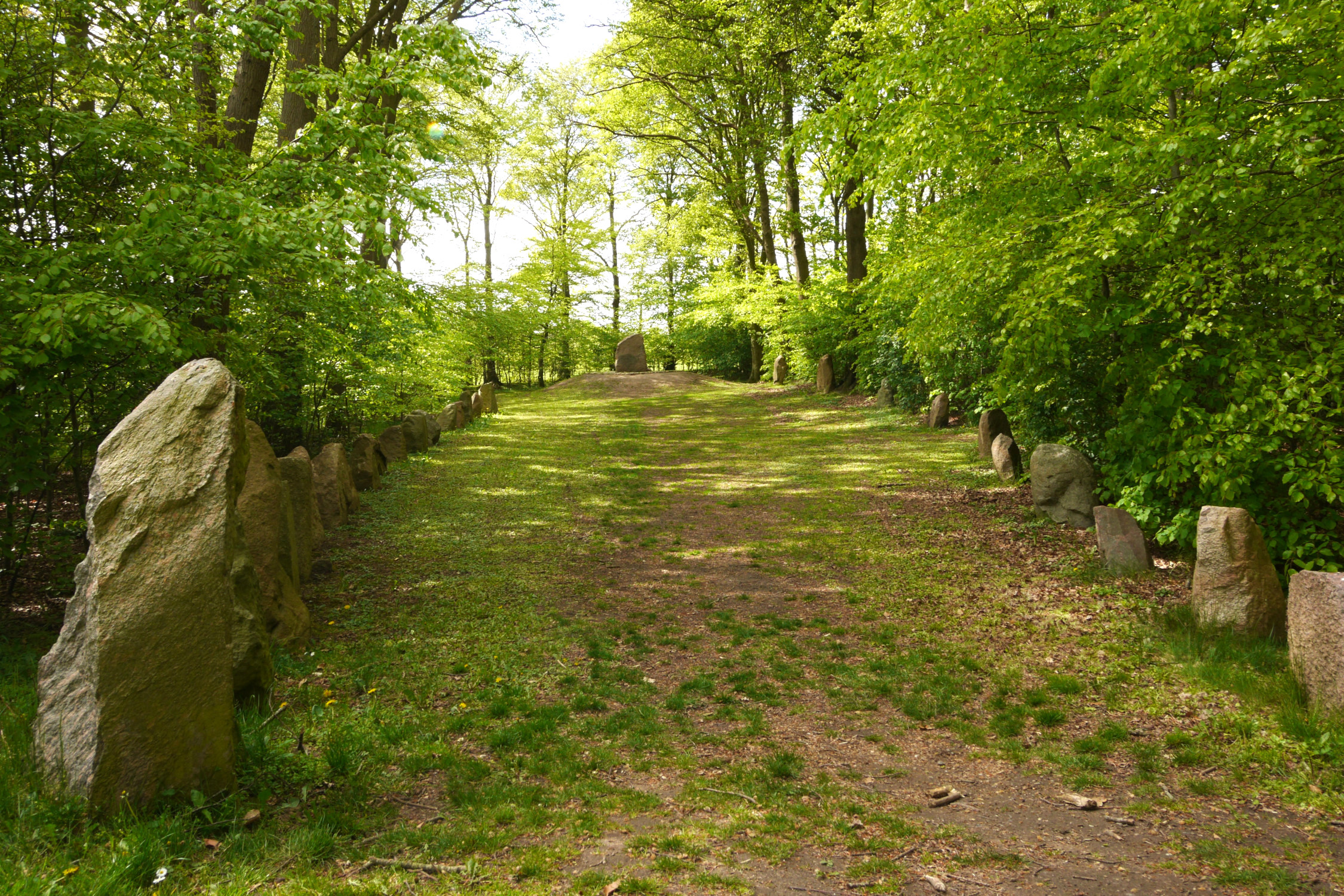
Stone Ship
