= Gunnar Dafgård AB =

Swedish food company

Gunnar Dafgård AB (GDAB) was founded 1937 by Gunnar Dafgård and is Sweden's largest private food producer with an annual revenue of more than US$300 million. GDAB has customers throughout Europe with the main market being Scandinavia. GDAB produces all kinds of foods but the biggest selling products are Swedish meatballs, pizza, lasagna and ready meals. GDAB's own brands include Billy's Pizza, Familjen Dafgård and Gorby's.

Internationally, GDAB is best known for producing the meatballs for IKEA in all the European markets.
