= Strängnäs stone =

Proto-Germanic runestone discovered in Sweden in 1962

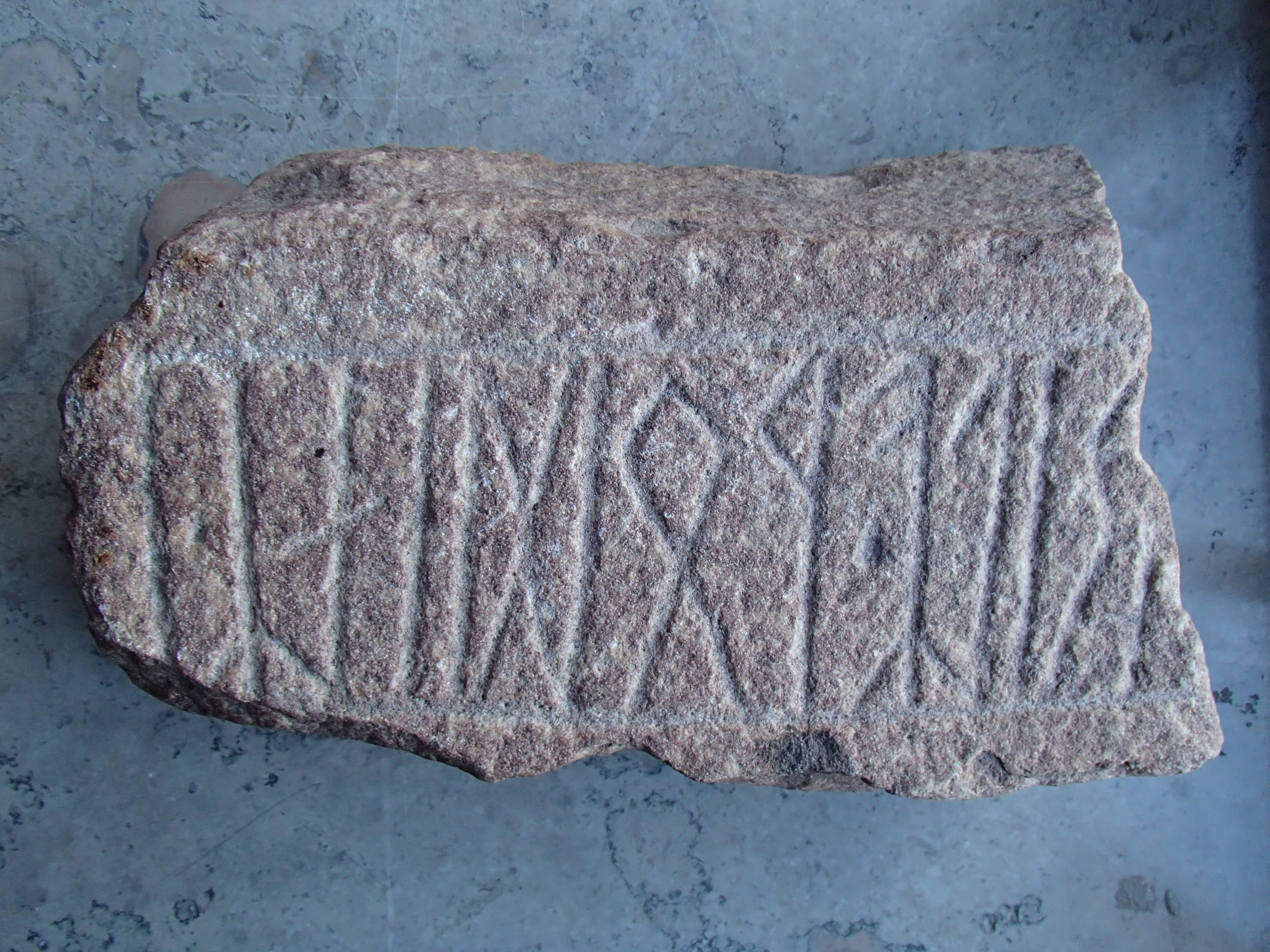
The Strängnäs stone

The Strängnäs stone (Swedish: Strängnässtenen), or runic inscription Sö Fv2011;307 (formerly Sö ALLHSÖDERM;77), is a runestone inscribed with runes written in Proto-Norse using the Elder Futhark alphabet. It was discovered in 1962, when a stove was demolished in a house at Klostergatan 4, in Strängnäs, Sweden. The stone is of Jotnian sandstone and measures 21 centimetres (8.3 in) in length, 13 centimetres (5.1 in) in width and 7.5 centimetres (3.0 in) in thickness.

The inscription consists of just two words, both of them notable in the study of Germanic languages – Erilaʀ and Wodinʀ – which are of such mythical character that the stone's authenticity has often been questioned. The first word is compared to that of the Heruls, a Germanic tribe with a traditional homeland in Scandinavia, and to the title jarl and its Anglo-Saxon form earl. The second word is a late Proto-Norse, and otherwise unattested, form of Odin, a deity in Germanic mythology.

In spite of international interest from prominent scholars in the field, it took 49 years before the stone was formally described by runologists. A 2011 study remarks that the poor documentation concerning the discovery of the inscription creates uncertainty about its authenticity, but four independent geological and technical analyses support that it is an authentic Proto-Norse inscription, in addition to linguistic and runological support.

== Discovery ==
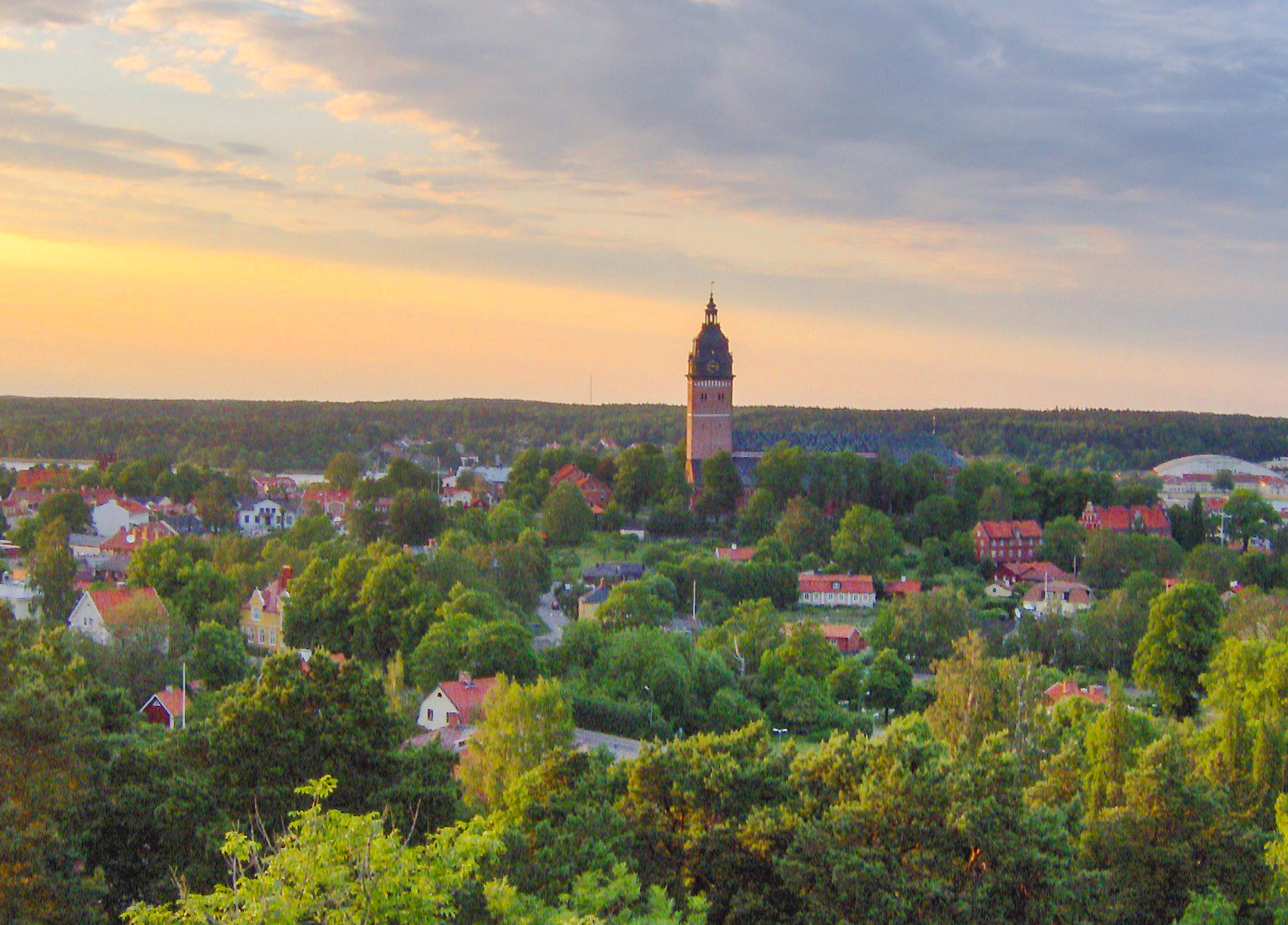
Strängnäs

Curator Carl Gustaf Blomberg reported to the Swedish National Antiquarian Sven B. F. Jansson that the stone had probably been inserted among bricks when an iron stove was installed in a private home at the end of the 1870s. The district antiquarian, Ivar Schnell, was in the midst of finishing a publication and asked Jansson for a picture and a description of the inscription. Jansson reported that the stone consisted of the inscription …rila͡ʀ •wodinʀ • and stated:

Vi möter här två välkända ord. Det första

är det i flera urnordiska inskrifter belagda,

dunkla ordet erilaʀ, det andra ordet är

otvivelaktigt Oden. Denna inskrift kommer

att sätta myror i huvudet på oss runforskare.

Here we encounter two well-known words. The first one
is attested from several Proto-Norse inscriptions,
the nebulous word erilaʀ, and the other word is
doubtlessly Odin. This inscription is
bound to puzzle us runologists.

Schnell published a picture of the stone with a caption that agreed well with Jansson's and a tentative dating to the 5th century.

=== Possible origin ===
The stone may originally have come from the island of Selaön east of Strängnäs. The island was historically an important settlement, and the Old Norse Ynglinga saga tells that Selaön (ON: Sila) was where the legendary king Granmar of Södermanland went to a feast at one of his farms. An important estate on this island was Tuna, at Kolsundet strait.

== International interest ==
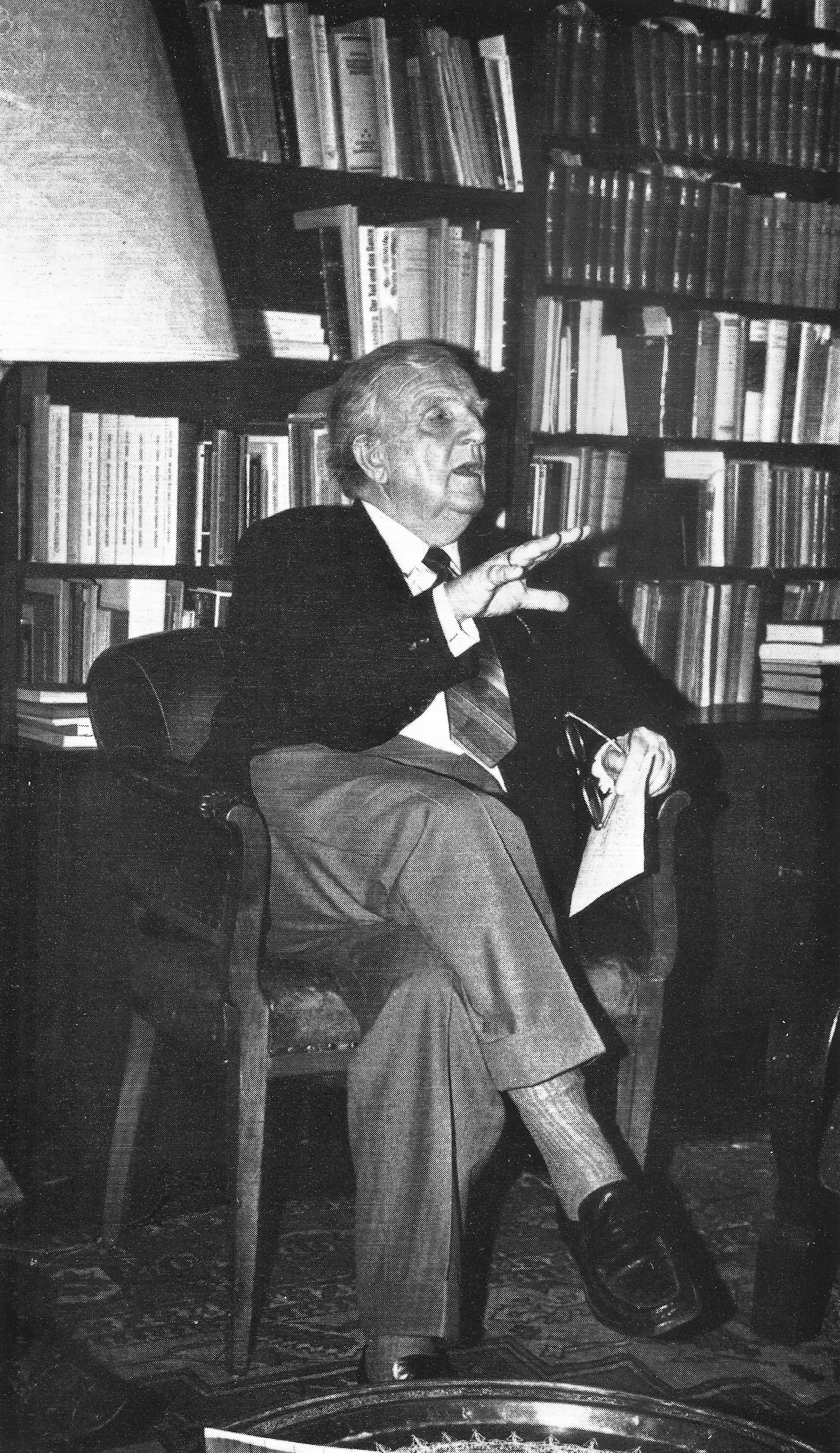
Otto Höfler

In 1968, Austrian philologist Otto Höfler, at the University of Vienna, asked Jansson if the inscription was authentic and when it would be published. Elisabeth Svärdström at the Swedish National Heritage Board answered him that it was by appearance Proto-Norse, but both she and Jansson considered it to be a recent inscription. Höfler was at the time working on erilaz inscriptions and protested in defense of the inscription, remarking that a presumed forger would have had to be rather sophisticated in his method and also be remarkably well-versed in phonological developments. He again insisted that the inscription be formally discussed and published. Svärdström answered that the National Antiquarian intended to publish it formally in Fornvännen, but was delayed due to other commitments. It had taken several months before a proper study could be performed on the circumstances surrounding the find, and so information was lacking, and moreover the iron stove proved to be of a type that was produced no earlier than 1910. German linguist Wolfgang Krause, at the University of Göttingen, also became involved, being sent copies of the correspondence. Despite two prominent foreign scholars showing interest in the find, there was no formal publication regarding the stone until 2011.

== Linguistic analysis and context ==
In one of his later letters in 1968, Otto Höfler stated that if the inscription was a forgery, the forger must have been sophisticated enough to know about the historic loss of final vowels after long vowels in Proto-Norse (…in einer Zeit, in der … der Endungsvokal nach den langen ō in wodinʀ schon geschwunden gewesen wäre. '...at a time when ... the ending vowel after the long ō in wodinʀ would have already disappeared'). The forger would also need to have known that an Elder Futhark inscription would be read from right to left instead of from left to right. Moreover, at the end of the 19th century when the stone was placed in the wall, there were not yet any scholarly discussions about erilaʀ or wōðinaʀ which might have inspired a forger.

The word erilaʀ was not known until 1918, when Erik Noreen made the academic world aware of his interpretation of the Järsberg runestone in Värmland. Neither could the fake inscription Wodana hailag on the Kärlich brooch from Rheinland-Pfalz have inspired the inscription from Strängnäs.

=== Wodinʀ ===
The Proto-Norse morpheme *wōð- (from PIE *wāt-), is the origin of OWN u-stem óðr used as an adjective meaning 'raging', 'wild' and 'possessed', and as a noun in the senses 'mind', 'thought', 'poetry' and 'poem', and to this morpheme the name of the Norse god Óðinn also belongs. The Germanic morpheme *wōð- has different derivations formed with n-suffixes, i.e. the suffix -ana- in Óðinn and the variant -ina- in Middle English Wednesdei (with i-umlaut ō ē). Historically, wodinʀ would represent a relatively late stage of Proto-Norse with syncope of the last vowel, to compare with the inscription hAriwolafʀ on the Stentoften Runestone and hAerAmAlAusʀ on the Björketorp Runestone. The PN *wōðu- is found in the male name Wōðurīðaʀ in the dative case form woduride (with i-stem derivation) on the Tune stone, and with the prefix un- in unwodi͡ʀ on the Gårdlösa fibula, which would mean 'not raging'. The reason why the Norse god was called both Óðinn and Óðr in Old Icelandic literature is possibly due to Óðr representing an older version of the god. The theonym Óðinn is unattested in runestone inscriptions with the Elder Futhark, but appears in the form Wodan on the Nordendorf I fibula from the second half of the 6th century, and on the Ribe skull fragment from c. 725.

Wodinʀ in the inscription may be a formation with the suffix -na- (PIE -no-), i.e. -ana-, -na- or -ína-, and with all those three alternative variants, syncopization may lead to the form wodinʀ. The use of long vowel before the last suffix may have served to distance the derivation from the root *wōðuz. In Proto-Germanic, the suffix -īna- served to form adjectives denoting state and kind. Later the meaning 'of a certain kind' evolved into 'propensity' and 'talent', like ON heppinn ('lucky') from happ ('luck'). It is consequently possible that the man who wrote the inscription called himself the "Eril with a talent for (divine?) possession" (ON øðinn). This can be compared with other words derived from øð-, like øðifullr ('crazy') and øðimaðr ('man with a temper').

=== Erilaʀ ===
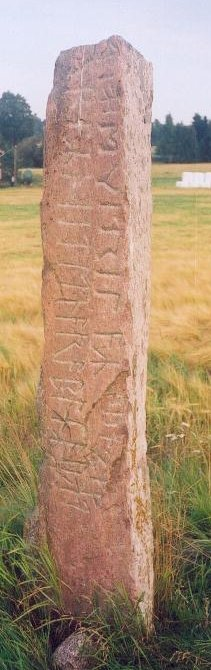
The Järsberg Runestone

Parts of the inscription are missing, but in the erilaʀ inscriptions, the phrase "I the Eril" appears in at least four, and possibly six cases. If the Strängäs inscription is authentic, it should have contained that phrase too, and wodinʀ would not have referred to the god Odin, but be the name of a person. The commonly discussed word erilaʀ, which is also associated with the tribe Heruls and the title Jarl, appears with some variations in nine or ten inscriptions: 1kJ 16 Bratsberg, 27 Kragehul, 29 Lindholmen, 156 Veblungsnes, 169 Rosseland, 70 Järsberg, 171 By, 128 Väsby and Äskatorp, and in a recent find from Trollhättan 2009. The find from Strängnäs is the first one from the Mälaren Valley. The inscriptions are dated to the 5th and 6th centuries, and are from Norway, Sweden and Denmark, which suggests that the word is a formula. In a 2011 paper, Helmer Gustavsson and Jan O.H. Swantesson consider that the word probably does not denote an ethnicity (Heruls) or a title (jarl/earl), but that it may instead refer to cultic activities.

Runographically it is notable that the bind rune a͡ʀ is used in the Erilaʀ of the inscription. Among the five Proto-Norse inscriptions where it is found, two are in the word erilaʀ, viz. in KJ 16 Bratsberg and 27 Kragehul, and a third find is a bracteate that was found in Trollhättan in 2009. Striking is also the existence of bind runes in the ek erilaʀ/irilaʀ inscriptions, which according to Mindy Mac Leod may be to catch the attention of the readers. It is remarkable that the Strängnäs inscription was engraved in a closed frame, and that there are two dividing signs in the form of dots. That kind of dividing sign is rare but is found on the Kalleby stone. Frame lines are rare and this is a unique case of a closed frame.

== Geological studies ==
Several geological studies have been made of the inscription, all of them in favour of it being authentic.

As early as the fall of 1962, restorer Arne Strömberg, head of the Heritage Board's technical department, performed a geological analysis of the stone. In his evaluation he stated that the inscription clearly showed no signs of being recent, but that it was not possible to establish its age. There had been a faint erosion that had removed all remains of crushed quartz and which had also somewhat coarsened the granular relief in the grooves. He also deemed that the stone had been larger when the inscription was made, having been broken apart at a later time.

Runo Löfvendahl at the Heritage Board studied the stone in 2002, and noted that no traces could be found of vegetal growth, and that there were tar stains, although not in the grooves. He stated that it is to be expected that the grooves are lighter in colour than the surface of the stone, as they were engraved in quartzite, and that the inscription probably is authentic.

Gustavsson and Swantesson comment that the inscription looks recent, but remark that it is not unusual that inscriptions done in quartzite look recent since erosion of quartzite is very slow in Scandinavian conditions. For example, three petroglyphs in another type of quartzitic sandstone that dates to the Nordic Bronze Age have been preserved in an almost pristine state in Järrestad near Simrishamn. These petroglyphs are considerably older than the runic inscription, yet have almost no noticeable traces of erosion.

In 2007, Laila Kitzler-Åhfeldt created a model with an optical 3D scanner, for a pilot study in preparation for the formal publication of the inscription that would take place in 2011, in Fornvännen, nearly 50 years after the original discovery. She studied the traces of the cutting technique of parts of runes 5 (w), 7 (d) and 10 (ʀ), as well as the two lines over and under the text. She intended to compare the Sparlösa, the Tunnerstad, and the Rök runestones from the early Viking Age with five modern runestones made in the 1990s. According to the analysis, the Strängnäs stone is cut with an archaic technique and is most similar to the Sparlösa runestone, then the Tunnerstad, and finally the Rök runestone. These three stones can be dated on linguistic and runological bases to the 9th century. There is very little that resembles the technique in which the modern inscriptions were made. Gustavsson and Swantesson caution, however, that the method is new and has not been tested on many inscriptions, and it is not known whether the differences in technique may be due to the nature of the stone.
