= Blekinge stones =

The Blekinge stones are four early Elder Futhark runestones found in Blekinge, Sweden:

- Björketorp Runestone
- Gummarp Runestone
- Istaby Runestone
- Stentoften Runestone
