= Alu (runic) =

Runic inscription with uncertain meaning

The runic charm word alu

The sequence alu (ᚨᛚᚢ) is found in numerous Elder Futhark runic inscriptions of Germanic Iron Age Scandinavia (and more rarely in early Anglo-Saxon England) between the 3rd and the 8th century. The word appears either alone (such as on the Elgesem runestone) or as part of an apparent formula (such as on the Lindholm "amulet" (DR 261) from Scania, Sweden). The symbols represent the runes Ansuz, Laguz, and Uruz. The origin and meaning of the word are matters of dispute, though a general agreement exists among scholars that the word represents an instance of historical runic magic or is a metaphor (or metonym) for it. It is the most common of the early runic charm words.

The word disappeared from runic inscriptions after the Migration Period, even before the Christianization of Scandinavia. It may have lived on beyond this period with an increasing association with ale, appearing in stanzas 7 and 19 of the Old Norse poem Sigrdrífumál, compiled in the 13th century Poetic Edda, where knowledge of invocative "ale runes" (Old Norse ölrúnar) is imparted by the Valkyrie Sigrdrífa. Theories suggested the unique term ealuscerwen (possibly "pouring away of alu"), used to describe grief or terror in the epic poem Beowulf, recorded around the 9th to 11th century, may be related.

== Etymology ==
Although the literal meaning of the word alu is "ale," i.e. "intoxicating beverage," earlier proposed etymologies for the word sought a connection with Proto-Germanic aluh "amulet, taboo" from alh "protect." Cognates in Germanic dialects would include Old English ealh "temple," Gothic alhs "temple," and Old Norse alh "amulet." Edgar Polomé initially proposed an etymological connection between Germanic alu and Hittite alwanza "affected by witchcraft," which is in turn connected to Greek alúõ "to be beside oneself" and Latvian aluôt "to be distraught." This etymology was later proven faulty and dropped by Polomé, though he continued to suggest that a common semantic denominator connects these words with alu.

Linguistic connections have been proposed between the term and the Proto-Germanic term *aluþ, meaning "ale," and the word is sometimes translated as meaning "ale," though this linguistic approach has been criticized as having "crucial difficulties." Polomé takes the word to belong to the "technical operative vocabulary" of the Germanic peoples, originally referring to "an ecstatic mental state as transferred to a potent drink" used in religious rituals in Germanic paganism.

Raetian North Etruscan dedicatory votive objects have been discovered featuring alu where the term means "dedication". Connections have been proposed between these objects and the term alu found on runic inscriptions. Theories have been proposed that the term was loaned into Runic usage from this source.

== Inscriptions ==
=== Bracteates ===
The inscription alu appears on the following bracteates: G 205, DR BR6, DR BR13, DR BR25, DR BR42, DR BR54, DR BR59, DR BR63A, DR BR67, DR EM85;123, and DR NOR2002;10.

==== G 205 ====
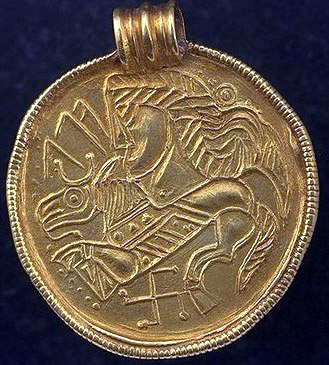
Bracteate G 205 bearing the inscription Alu.

A gold bracteate (G 205) discovered in Djupbrunns, Hogrän, Sweden reads simply Alu and dates from around 400 CE. The bracteate was discovered in the same location as another gold bracteate (G 204) from a younger date that features the inscription ek erilaz. Today the bracteate is located in Swedish History Museum, Stockholm, Sweden.

==== DR BR6 ====
A fragment of a bracteate (DR BR6) discovered in Skrydstrup, South Jutland, Denmark bears the term Alu.

lauk=az alu lauk=az alu
Laukaz alu. Laukaz alu.

The fragment dates from around 400 to 650 CE. Today the bracteate is housed in the National Museum of Denmark in Copenhagen, Denmark.

==== DR BR42 ====
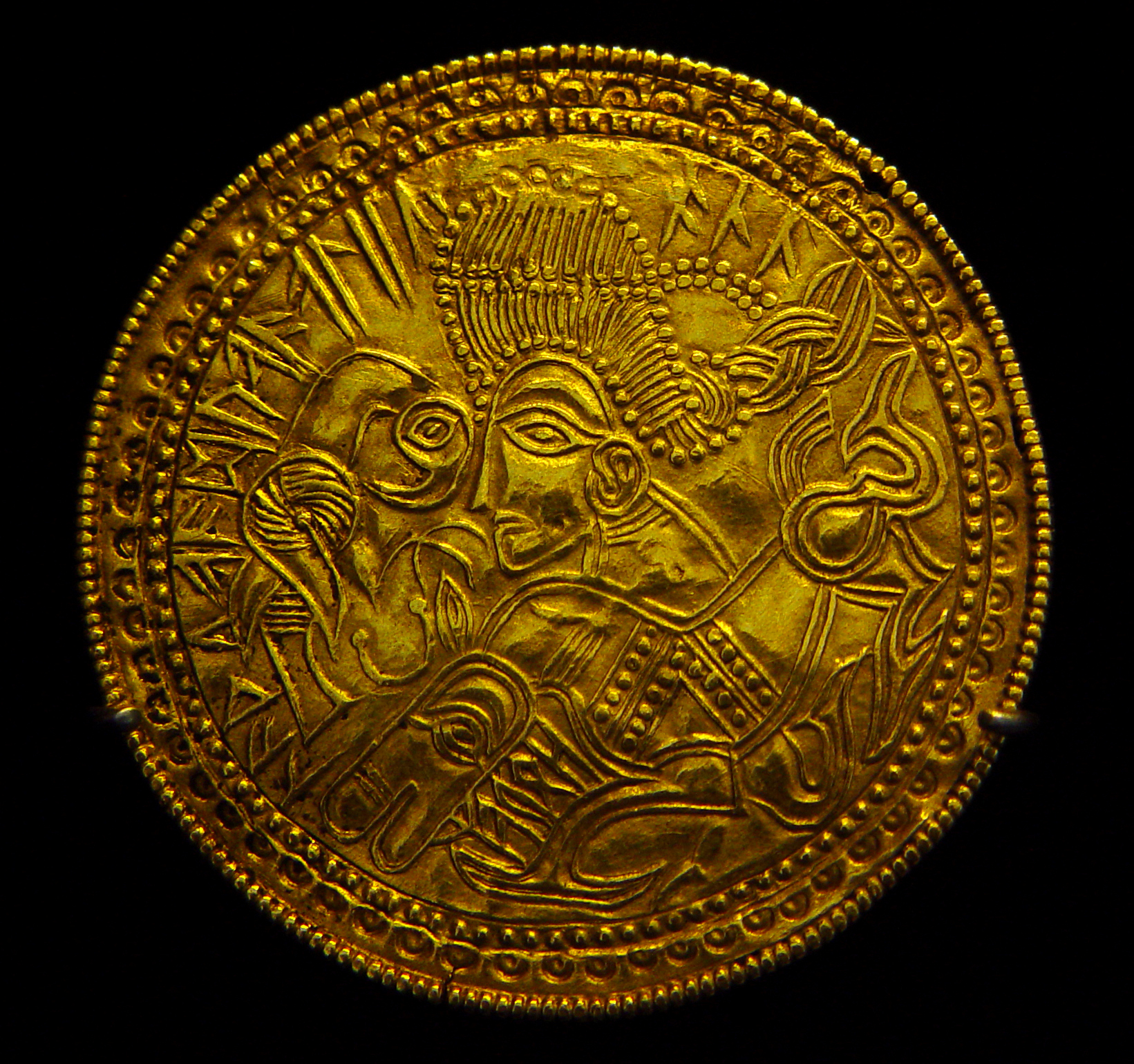
The Funen bracteate (DR BR42).

A bracteate discovered on the island of Funen, Denmark features incomprehensible and meaningful text. The bracteate is housed with many others at the National Museum of Denmark. The transcription reads:

ᚺᛟᚢᚨᛉ ᛚᚨᚦᚢ ᚨᚨᛞᚢᚫᚫᚫᛚᛁᛁᚨ ᚨ--
houaz laþu aaduaaaliia a--

What is transcribed as a-- above has been tentatively read as alu. The word houaz has previously been interpreted as corresponding to Old Norse hávi "the high one", a name of Odin, but more recent scholarship instead prefers a reading horaz 'dear, beloved'.

==== DR NOR2002;10 ====
The Uppåkra bracteate (DR NOR2002;10), a C-bracteate found in Uppåkra, Scania, Sweden during a search with a metal detector in 2000. The bracteate bears a Proto-Norse runic inscription. The transliteration reads:

sima-ina alu

The bracteate depicts a man's head over a four-legged animal. The A inscription (first part, sima-ina) is placed over the back part of the head, while the B inscription (second part, alu) is placed over the animal's front legs.

The inscription seems to belong to the big group of C-bracteates with more or less comprehensible charm words.

=== Runestones ===
==== Eggja stone ====
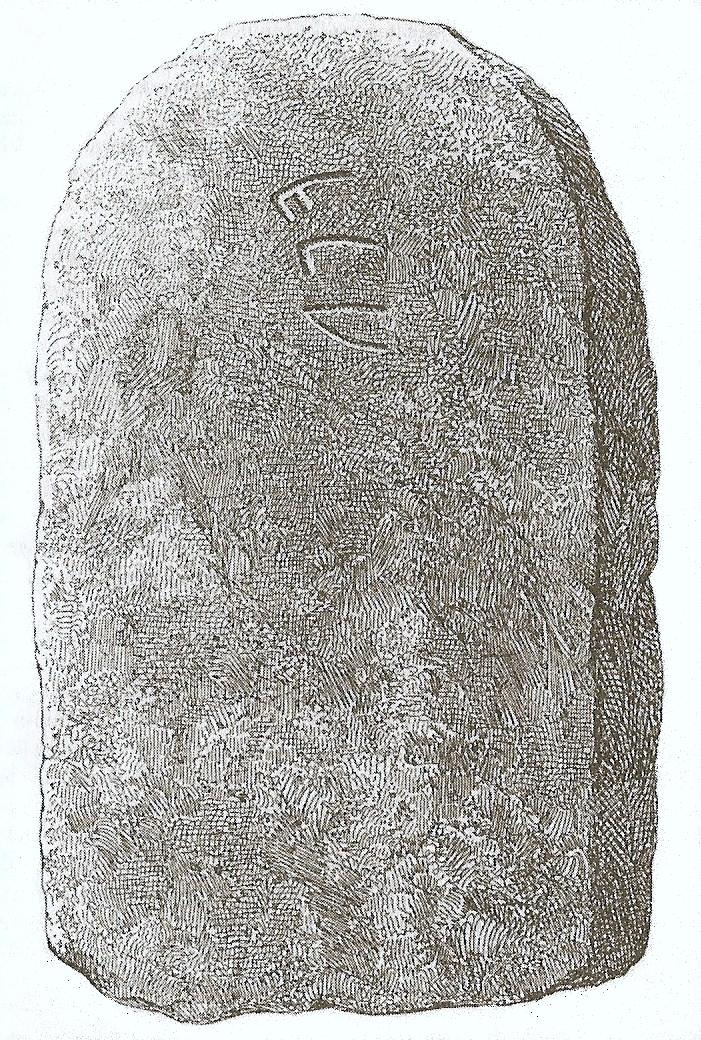
The Elgesem runestone (mirror-imaged in this engraving).

The third panel Elder Futhark inscriptions found on the 7th or 8th CE century Eggja stone discovered on the farm Eggja located in Sogn og Fjordane, Norway is often interpreted as reading alu.

==== Elgesem runestone ====
An inscription reading "alu" is found on a stone discovered in a grave mound located by the farm of Elgesem, Vestfold, Norway, in 1870. The Elgesem runestone, listed in the Rundata catalog as N KJ57 U, is dated to about 400 CE. The stone is 172 centimeters tall and 90 centimeters wide, and the thickness is about 18 centimeters. The inscription is written counter-clockwise and is to be read from the top downwards. As the stone has been purposefully shaped, it has been suggested that the Elgesem runestone was a cult stone used as part of some ritual. It has also been suggested that similar shaped cult stones are depicted on the Stora Hammars I, Ardre VIII and Tängelgårda IV image stones.

==== Eketorp slate fragment ====
The Eketorp slate fragment (Öl ACTARC37;211 U) is a runestone that was found in Eketorp, Sweden and features an Elder Futhark inscription in Proto-Norse.

The first line of the inscription reads:

... alu k...

The second line of the inscription reads:

...gþutþ...

==== Kinneve stone ====
The Kinneve stone (Vg 134) is a stone fragment (measures 7,4 x 5,0 x 2,0 cm) of red soapstone dated to around 600 CE. It was found by chaplain John Lagerblom in 1843 in a grave on the area of the rectory (Prästgården) of Kinneve socken, Sweden. The stone is today housed in the collection of the Västergötland museum, Skara, Sweden. The inscription has been read as:

...siz alu h

siz (siR - the last rune is the *Algiz rune) has by Y. Kodratoff been interpreted as the end of a name, and according to Kodratoff the h can represent the *Haglaz rune. Since the fragment was found in a grave, the inscription has been theorized as potentially related to a death cult or "mortuary magic."

==== Årstad stone ====
The Årstad stone (N KJ58) is a runestone found in 1855 on the Årstad farm in Rogaland, Norway. It bears 18-20 runes of the Elder Futhark on three lines. The second line reads saralu, which is by some scholars split into the words sar and alu. Today the stone is housed in the Antiquities Collection at the Museum of Cultural History in Oslo.

=== Other ===
The inscription alu appears on the following objects:

==== Nydam Mose ====
===== Nydam Arrow =====
The Nydam Arrow (DR 13) is an arrow discovered in Nydam Mose, South Jutland, Denmark that bears the inscription lua which has been interpreted as a distorted alu. It is dated to around 200 to 350 CE. Today the arrow is housed in Museum für Vorgeschichtliche Altertümer in Kiel, Germany.

===== Nydam arrow shafts =====
The Nydam arrow shafts (DR MS1995;344 and DR AUD1994;266) are two arrow shafts discovered in Nydam Mose, South Jutland, Denmark that bear the inscriptions la and lua respectively. They have both been interpreted as alu, but it is not certain. The arrow shafts are dated to around 300 to 350 CE. Today they are housed at the National Museum of Denmark in Copenhagen.

===== Nydam axe shaft =====
The Nydam axe shaft (DR MS1995;341) is a wooden axe shaft discovered in Nydam Mose, South Jutland, Denmark that bears a runic inscription. It is dated to around 300 to 350 CE. Today it is housed at the National Museum of Denmark in Copenhagen.

==== Værløse Fibula ====
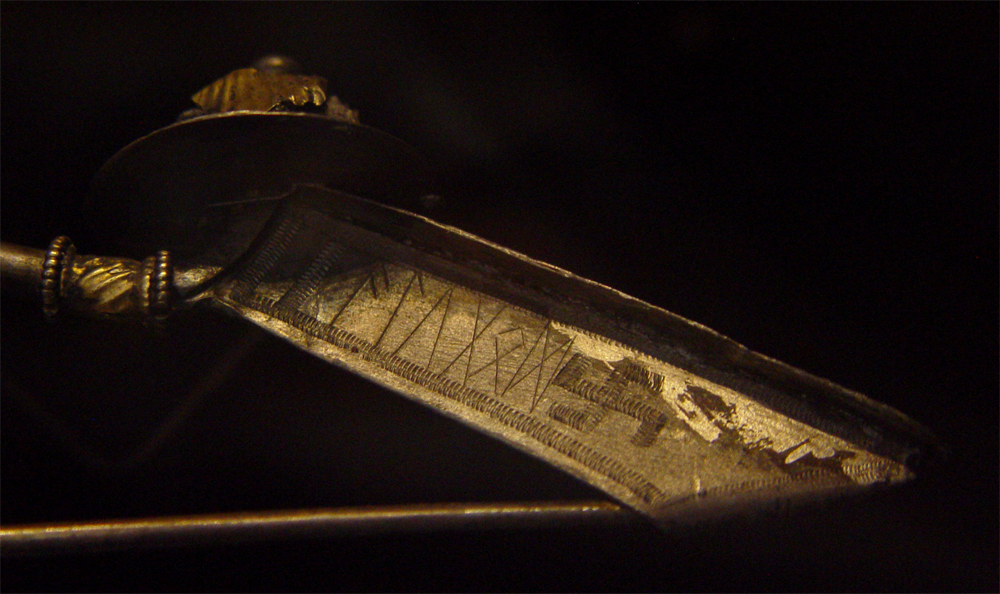
Detail of the inscription on the Værløse Fibula reading alugod followed by a swastika.

A 3rd century silver fibula (DR EM85;123) from Værløse, Zealand, Denmark features a runic inscription on its pinholder that reads "alugod" followed by a swastika. The Værløse Fibula is housed at the National Museum of Denmark.

==== Lindholm "amulet" ====
The Lindholm "amulet" (DR 261) is a bone piece found in Skåne, dated to the 2nd to 4th centuries. The inscription contains the word alu.

==== Cremation urns ====
Three 5th century cremation urns from Spong Hill, Norfolk, England bear the impression of the term alu by "the same runic stamp" in mirror-runes.

==== Setre Comb ====
The Setre Comb is a comb from the 6th or early 7th century featuring runic inscriptions. The comb is the subject of an amount of scholarly discourse as most experts accept the reading of the Germanic charm word alu and Nanna, though there exists questions as to if Nanna is the same figure as the goddess from later attestations.

== See also ==
- Erilaz
- Laukaz
- List of runestones
- Runic magic
- Symbel
