= Ealuscerwen =

Ealuscerwen (ealuscerƿen, [ˈæ͜ɑ.lu.ʃerˠ.wen]) is an Old English hapax legomenon found in Beowulf (verse 769). Since it appears to refer to a part of Anglo-Saxon drinking ritual, it has commanded a lot of scholarly attention.

The context in which it appears is:

dryht‐sele dynede, • Denum eallum wearð,
ceaster‐būendum, • cēnra gehwylcum,
eorlum ealu‐scerwen.

Translation:

The noble hall broke into a din; the Danes all were,
the citadel-dwellers each of the bold,
earls in the flood of bitter drink

—Translated by Slade

Slade in a footnote states that "the kenning (if it is one) is obscure". From the context it is clear that "being in ealuscerwen" is an unpleasant state. The first part of the compound is clearly ealu "ale". The second part, scerwen is less clear. A simplex *scerwen is unknown. There is a compound verb be-scerwen, meaning "to deprive".

Klaeber conjectures that "-scerwen, related to *scerwan 'grant', 'allot' (bescerwan ='deprive') - 'dispensing of ale', or, in a pregnant sense, of 'bitter or fateful drink' might have come to be used as a figurative expression for 'distress'". Hoops favours "deprivation of ale". But Brodeur (chap 2 n.8) objects to this, pointing out that if bescerwan means "deprive", scerwan could not mean "allot" because the prefix be- does not express a negative. The literal meaning would rather seem to be "deprivation of ale", giving the ironic reading of "the Danes were as distressed by the attack as if they had run out of ale".

Tolkien also argues for the "deprivation of ale" interpretation and connects it to the word "meoduscerwen" (which is similarly translated as "dread" or "horror") in the poem Andreas. He argues that the "giving a bitter drink" interpretation does not work with meodu (mead), but also that the meaning is not quite as simple as "a fear that the beer (or mead) was gone", but more akin to the meaning of the idiomatic phrase (early in Beowulf) in which Scyld "denied the mead-benches to his foes", meaning that he prevented their pleasure.

Irving (1963) reads ealuscerwen as 'pouring of ale': "In Beowulf the tremendous din made by Grendel, first in struggling with Beowulf and later in roaring with pain and fright, seems to have reminded the poet of the ordinary or conventional occasion for such loud noise in a hall--a drinking party. He makes use of the opportunity to continue his ironic presentation of Grendel as a guest or caller at Heorot. The Danes then seem to be pictured, somewhat ironically, as hosts at the party" (p. 108). Splitter (1952) suggested a similar translation of "ale-serving", instead associating a quality of awe associated the pouring of ale at the ritual symbel.

Other suggestions assume a connection with the runic charm alu, taking "ale" as a symbol of good luck, and the pouring away of ale consequently as the failure of good luck.

The similar compound meoduscerwen, meodu "mead" plus scerwen is attested in Andreas.

== See also ==
- Alu (runic)
- Symbel
