= Hærulf Runestone =

Viking Age runestone in Southern Jutland, Denmark

Coordinates: 55.140768°N 9.344763°E

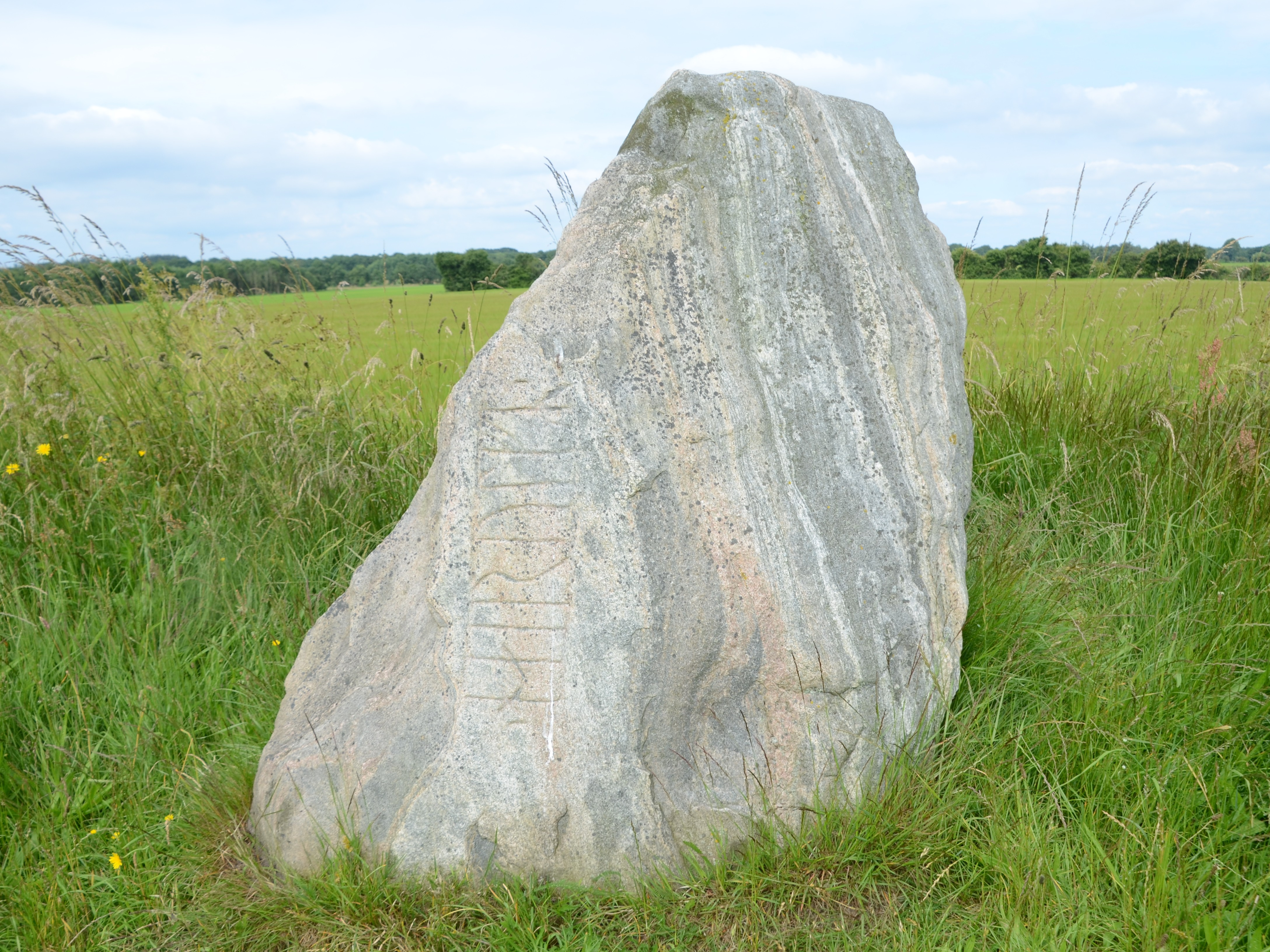
- Height: 124 cm
- Width: 24-59 cm
- Writing: Younger Futhark
- Created: c. 10th century
- Discovered: 1592; Immervad, Jutland, Denmark
- Present location: Jutland, Denmark
- Culture: Norse
- Rundata ID: DR 15
- Style: RAK
- Runemaster: Unknown

The Hærulf Runestone is a Viking Age runestone located at Hærvejen northeast of Hovslund Stationsby in Southern Jutland, Denmark.

== Description ==
The Hærulf Runestone dates from the 10th century and is classified as being carved in runestone style RAK. This is the classification for inscriptions with runic bands that have straight ends without any attached serpent or beast heads. The stone was originally located at Øster Løgum near the north-south Jutland highway. It is notable not only for its short inscription, which is the name Hærulf, but for having been taken to Berlin as war booty in 1864. It was not until 1952 that the stone was returned to Denmark near its original location. Although the inscription only has a single word, a single dot, which is normally a punctuation mark used as a word divider, has been placed before and after the runic letter hairulfʀ for the name Hærulf. This name is a shortened form of the Proto-Norse name Hariwulfa or Hariwulfʀ, which means either "Warrior-Wolf" or "War Host-Wolf," that is attested to on the Istaby and Stentoften Runestones.

The stone is known locally as Hærulfstenen (the Hærulf Stone).

== Inscription ==
' hairulfʀ '
{} Herjulfr. {}
{} Hærulfʀ. {}
Herjulfr.
