= Stoplesteinan =

Historic site in Rogaland, Norway

Stoplesteinan Stoplesteinane
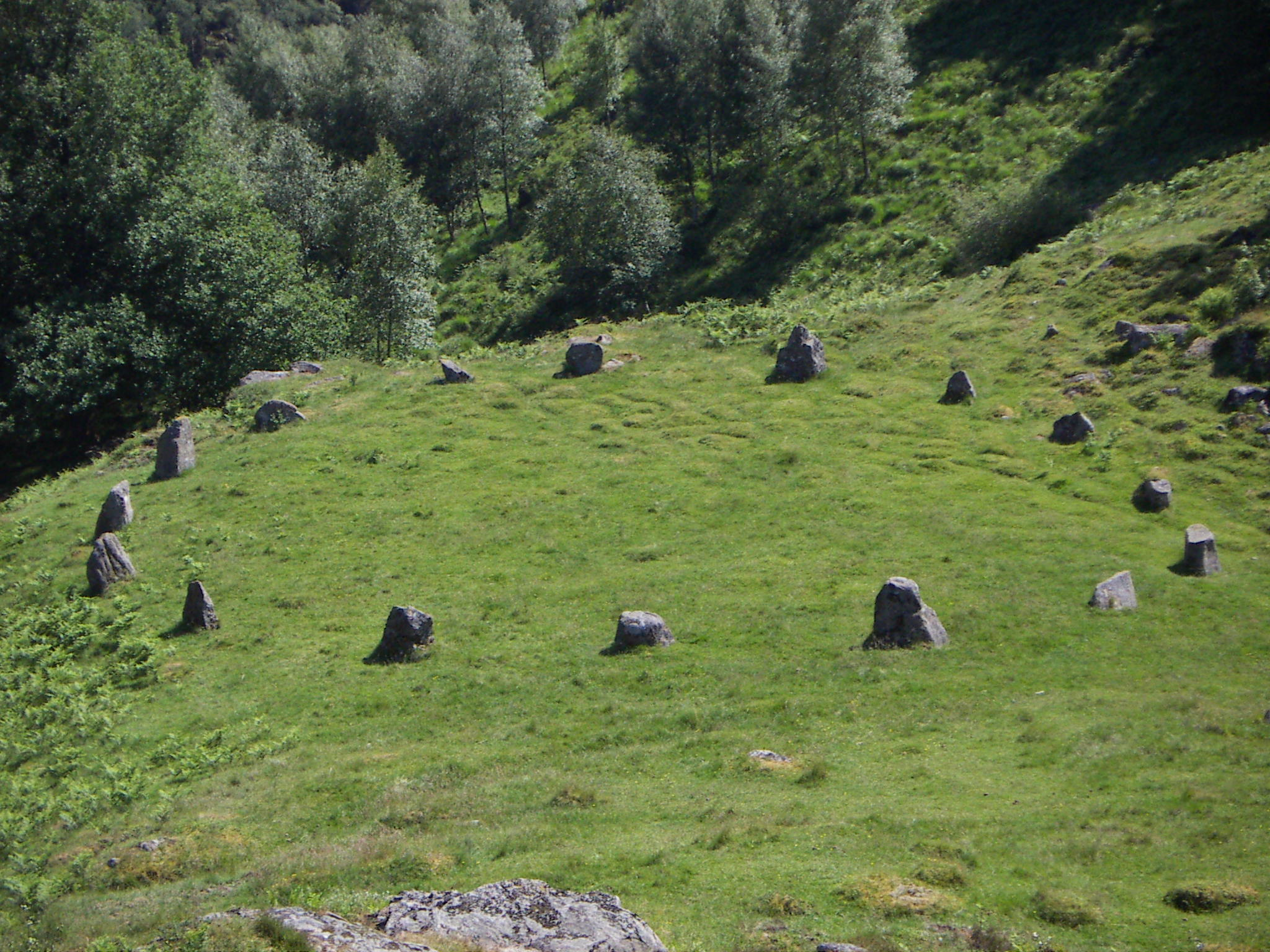
- Stoplesteinan in Egersund
- Interactive map of the area
- Location: Egersund, Norway
- Coordinates: 58.43947°N 6.01554°E

Stoplesteinan or Stoplesteinane is a stone circle located just outside the town of Egersund in Eigersund Municipality in Rogaland county, Norway. The monument has a diameter of about 21 meters (69 feet) and consists of 16 raised stones. Some of the stones are up to 1.2 meters (3.9 feet) tall. The Pilgrim's Route (St. Olafs vei) between Egersund and Sokndal goes right by the Stoplesteinan. It is visible as a green strip in the vegetation just next to the stone circle. Recently an information sign has been erected some 10 to 20 meters (33 to 66 feet) south-east of Stoplesteinan.

== Origin and theories ==
It is not known how or why the stone circle was constructed. Similar stone monuments exist across Northern Europe and the British Isles. Some of these have been excavated, and were found to be graves dating from the end of the Bronze Age until the end of the early Iron Age, dated to between 500 BC to 600 AD in Scandinavia. In Sweden there are a great number of similar circles called Domarringar (judge circles). They often have an odd number of stones, usually 7, 9 or 11. Often they also have a larger stone to the east, and most are burial sites from the late Iron Age. There are also stone settings with elliptical shape and sharp edges, thus resembling a ship. There are also theories that their shape could be used as a calendar based on the position of the sun. One such is Ale's Stones in Scania.

An excavation at Stoplesteinan during the 1930s found that the ground in the circle's center is paved with stones. Traces of burnt material were also found, lending credence to the theory that it is located at a place of burial. Snorre says in his 'Heimskringla' from the 13th century about Norwegian history that fyrsta öld er kölluð brunaöld; þá skyldi brenna alla dauða menn ok reisa eptir bautasteina (The first period is called the "burn age", since all dead men were burned and stone monuments raised for them).
