= Gummarp Runestone =

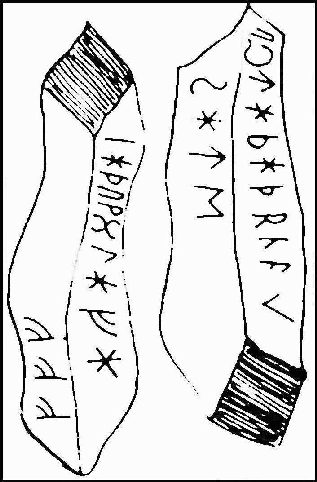
- Writing: Elder Futhark
- Created: 500-700AD
- Discovered: 1728; Gummarp, Blekinge, Sweden
- Present location: Destroyed.
- Culture: Norse
- Rundata ID: DR 358
- Style: RAK
- Runemaster: Unknown

Text – Native
- Proto-Norse : HaþuwulfR/HaþuwulfaR satte staba þria fff.

Translation
- Haþuwulfar placed three staves fff.

The Gummarp Runestone, designated as DR 358, was a runestone from the Vendel era and which was located in the former village of Gummarp in the province of Blekinge, Sweden.

== Description ==
The Gummarp Runestone was removed and taken to Copenhagen, where it was destroyed in the Copenhagen Fire of 1728. The runic inscription was recorded on reproductions of the runestone. It is classified as being in runestone style RAK.

The runes read: [(h)AþuwolAfA] [sAte] [(s)tA(b)A þr(i)a] [fff]

There are two interpretations of the text. One of them reads "Haþuwulfar placed three staves fff," and the other one assumes that the word apt meaning "after" was originally placed before the name Haþuwulfar which would change the meaning into "In memory of Haþuwulfar [...] placed [these] three staves fff." The three f-runes have been interpreted as ideographic runes to be read "wealth, wealth, wealth".

The Gummarp, Istaby Runestone and Stentoften Runestone inscriptions can be identified with the same clan through the names that are mentioned on them, and the names are typical for chieftains. The Björketorp Runestone lacks names and is raised some tens of kilometers from the others. However, it is beyond doubt that the Björketorp runestone is connected to them, because in addition to the special runic forms, the same message is given on the Stentoften Runestone.

The name Haþuwulfar has the common Viking Age name element of wulafa meaning "wolf" and heru, which when combined in personal names, means a "host" or "magnitude." It has been suggested that the assignment of such a name is related to ritualistic practices and religious wolf-symbolism used in the initiation of young warriors.

== Inscription ==
§QA [ᚺ]ᛡᚦᚢᚹᛟᛚᛡᚠᛡ
§QB ᛋᛡᛏᛖ
§QC [ᛋ]ᛏᛡ[ᛒ]ᛡ ᚦᚱ[ᛁ]ᚨ
§QD ᚠᚠᚠ

A transliteration of the runes into roman letters is:

§QA [... (h)AþuwolAfA]
§QB [... sAte]
§QC [... (s)tA(b)A þr(i)a]
§QD [fff]

== See also ==
- List of runestones
- Runic magic
