= Istaby Runestone =

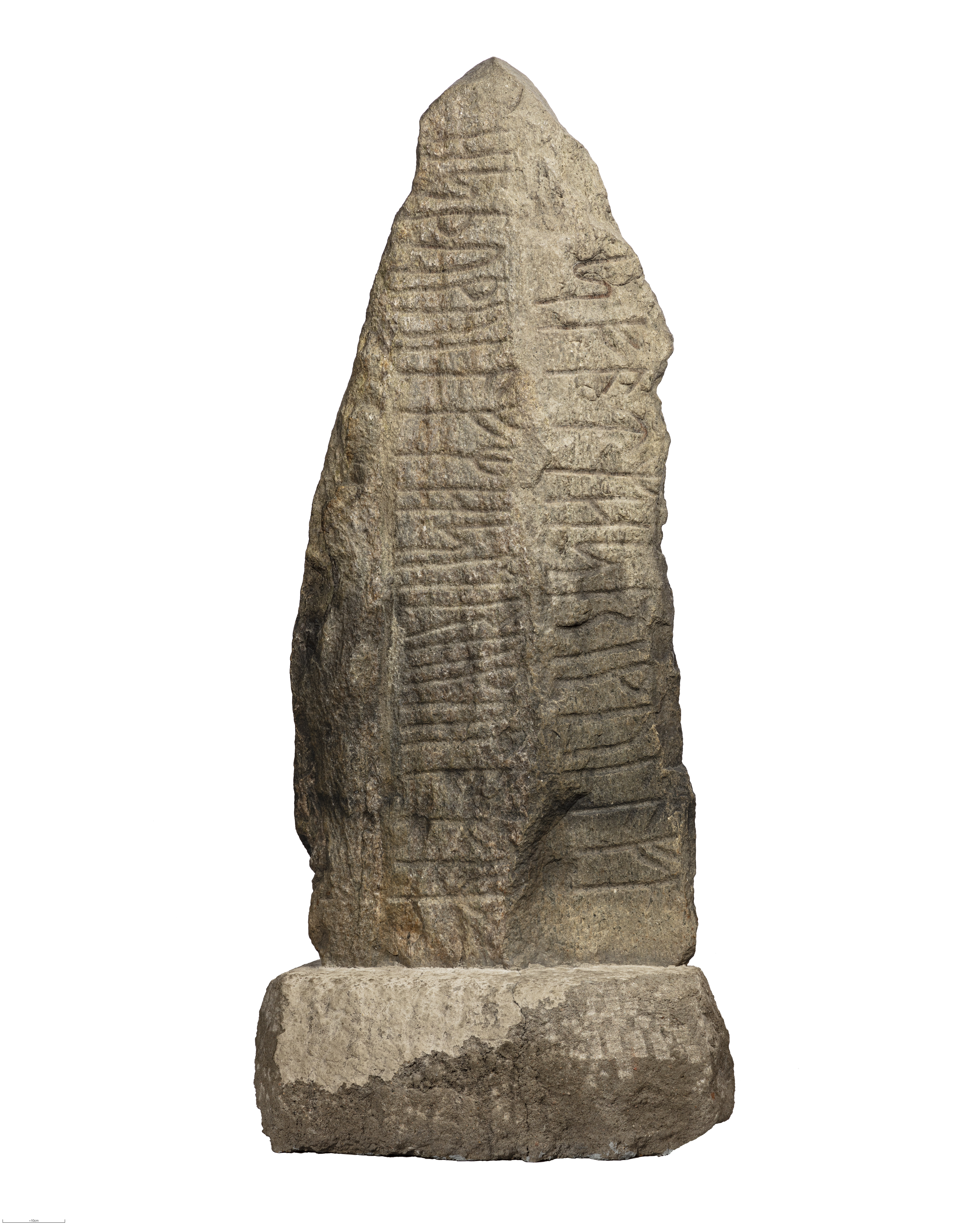
Istaby Runestone, side A

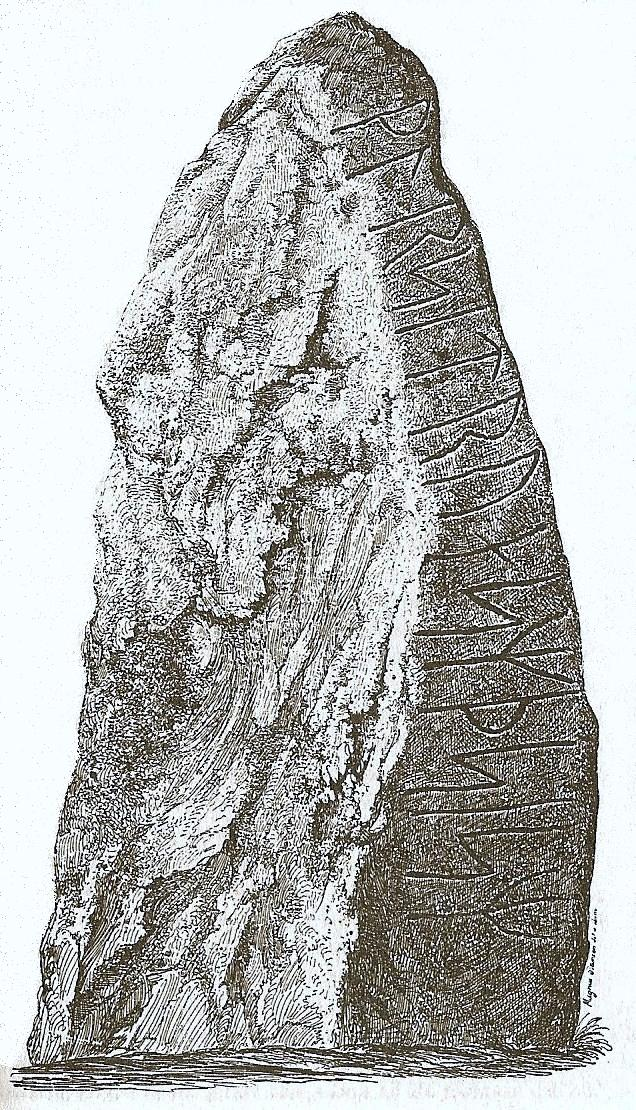
Istaby Runestone, side B

The Istaby Runestone, listed in the Rundata catalog as DR 359, is a runestone with an inscription in Proto-Norse which was raised in Istaby, Blekinge, Sweden, during the Vendel era (c. 550–790).

== Inscription ==
Afatz hAriwulafa ¶ hAþuwulafz hAeruwulafiz
Aftr Hariwulfa. {} Haþuwulfz Heruwulfiz
In memory of Hariwulfar. Haþuwulfar, Heruwulfar's son,

hAþuwulafz hAeruwulafiz ¶ Afatz hAriwulafa
Haþuwulfz Heruwulfiz {} aftr Hariwulfa
Haþuwulf(a)r, Heruwulfar's son, in memory of Hariwulfar

warAit runAz þAiAz
wrait runaz þaiaz.
wrote these runes.

== Interpretation ==
The Istaby, Stentoften Runestone and Gummarp Runestone inscriptions can be identified with the same clan through the names that are mentioned on them. The names have alliterative first name element combined with a lycophoric second element that represent an aristocratic naming tradition common among chieftains. The Björketorp Runestone lacks names and is raised some tens of kilometers from the others. However, it is beyond doubt that the Björketorp runestone is connected to them, because in addition to the special runic forms, the same message is given on the Stentoften Runestone. Of these, on stylistics grounds, the Istaby runestone may be the oldest.

The name Hariwulfa is a combination of hari meaning "warrior" and wulfaz "wolf," while the haþu of Haþuwulfz means "battle" and the heru of Heruwulfar, when combined in personal names, means "sword." The latter name also has a suffix indicating paternal descent, so the name Heruwulfar in full means "of the family of Sword-Wolf." A shortened form of the name Hariwulfa survived into the Viking Age and is attested in the inscription on the Hærulf Runestone. It has been suggested that the assignment of such lycophoric names is related to ritualistic practices and religious wolf-symbolism used in the initiation of young warriors.

The Istaby runestone is currently located at the Swedish Museum of National Antiquities in Stockholm. The stone has a Danish Rundata catalog number as Blekinge was part of the historic Denmark.

== See also ==
- List of runestones

== Sources ==
- Gräslund, Anne-Sofie (2006). "Wolves, Serpents and Birds: Their Symbolic Meaning in Old Norse Belief". In Andrén, Anders; Jennbert, Kristina; et al. (eds.). Old Norse Religion in Long-Term Perspectives: Origins, Changes, and Interactions. Lund: Nordic Academic Press. pp. 124–129. ISBN 91-89116-81-X.
- Jacobsen, Lis & Moltke, Erik: Danmarks Runeindskrifter. 3rd tome. 1941.
- Looijenga, Tineke (2003). Texts & Contexts of the Oldest Runic Inscriptions. Leiden: Koninklijke Brill NV. ISBN 90-04-12396-2.
- Sundqvist, Olof; Hultgård, Anders (2004). "The Lycophoric Names of the 6th to 7th Century Blekinge Runestones and the Problem of Their Ideological Background". In van Nahl, Astrid; Elmevik, Lennart et seq. (eds.). Namenwelten: Orts- und Personennamen in Historischer Sicht. Berlin: Walter de Gruyter. pp. 583–602. ISBN 3-11-018108-8.
