= Stone circle (Iron Age) =

Iron Age burial site in Scandinavia

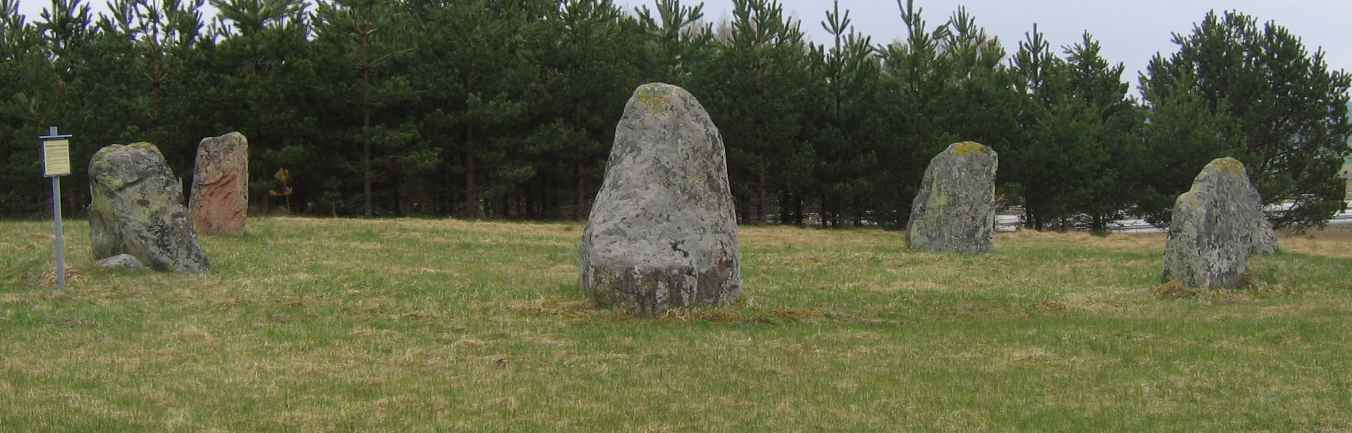
A minor stone circle in Brändåsen (59.04°N 14.60°E), Hardemo parish, Närke. Although, Närke is north of the main distribution area, the province has 50 remaining stone circles

The stone circles of the Iron Age (c. 500 BC – c. 400 AD) were a characteristic burial custom of southern Scandinavia and Southwestern Finland, especially on Gotland and in Götaland.

Finland court stones are found in Eura, Ulvila and Kokemäki. They date typically during the Pre-Roman Iron Age and the Roman Iron Age. In Sweden, they are called Domarringar (judge circles), Domkretsar (judge circles) or Domarsäten (judge seats). In Finland they are called Käräjäkivet (court stones). In some places in Nordic countries they were used until 17th century.

They should not be confused with earlier bronze age and neolithic Stone circles in the British Isles and Brittany.

== History ==
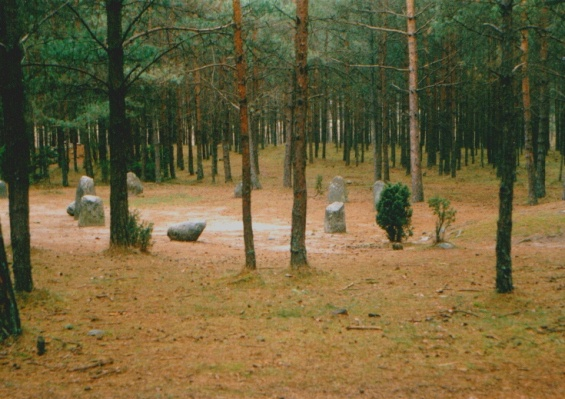
A stone circle in the area of northern Poland where the Goths initially settled after emigration from Scandza.

A tradition of making stone circles existed on the European continent in Wielbark culture near the mouth of the Vistula River in the first century. The practice suggests Norse influence but may have been established in the area before the arrival of the Goths.

The stone circles were sometimes used as burial grounds.

== Shapes ==
The circles are usually round, or elongated ellipses. The stones may be very large and there are usually between 9 and 12. Sometimes there are as few as 6–8. One stone circle, the circle of Nässja (near Vadstena), comprises as many as 24 stones. Excavations have shown burnt coal in the centre of the circles and they are nowadays considered to be incineration graves.

== Things ==
There is a widespread tradition that the circles were used for things, or general assemblies. Similar circles were used for popular assemblies in Denmark until the 16th century, and in Vad parish in Västergötland, the village assemblies were held in a stone circle until the 19th century.

== Snorri Sturluson ==
Even if knowledge that the stone circles were graves was later lost, it was still fresh in the 13th century as testified in these lines by Snorri Sturluson in the introduction of the Heimskringla:

As to funeral rites, the earliest age is called the Age of Burning; because all the dead were consumed by fire, and over their ashes were raised standing stones.

— Heimskringla by Snorri Sturluson

== Examples ==
- Gettlinge burial field, Öland, Sweden
- Hulterstad burial field, Öland, Sweden
- Jelling stones, Vejle, Denmark
- Käräjämäki, Eura, Finland
- Käräjämäki, Kokemäki, Finland
- Liikistö, Ulvila, Finland
- Stoplesteinan, Norway
- Odry, Pomerania, Poland
- Węsiory burial field, Kashubia, Poland

== See also ==
- Gårdlösa

== Sources ==
- Nationalencyklopedin
- A Polish Archaeology Article by Tadeusz Makiewicz
- ADuong's a history of Poland
