= Gårdlösa =

Archaeological site in Sweden

Coordinates: 55°33′12.38″N 14°08′07.57″E

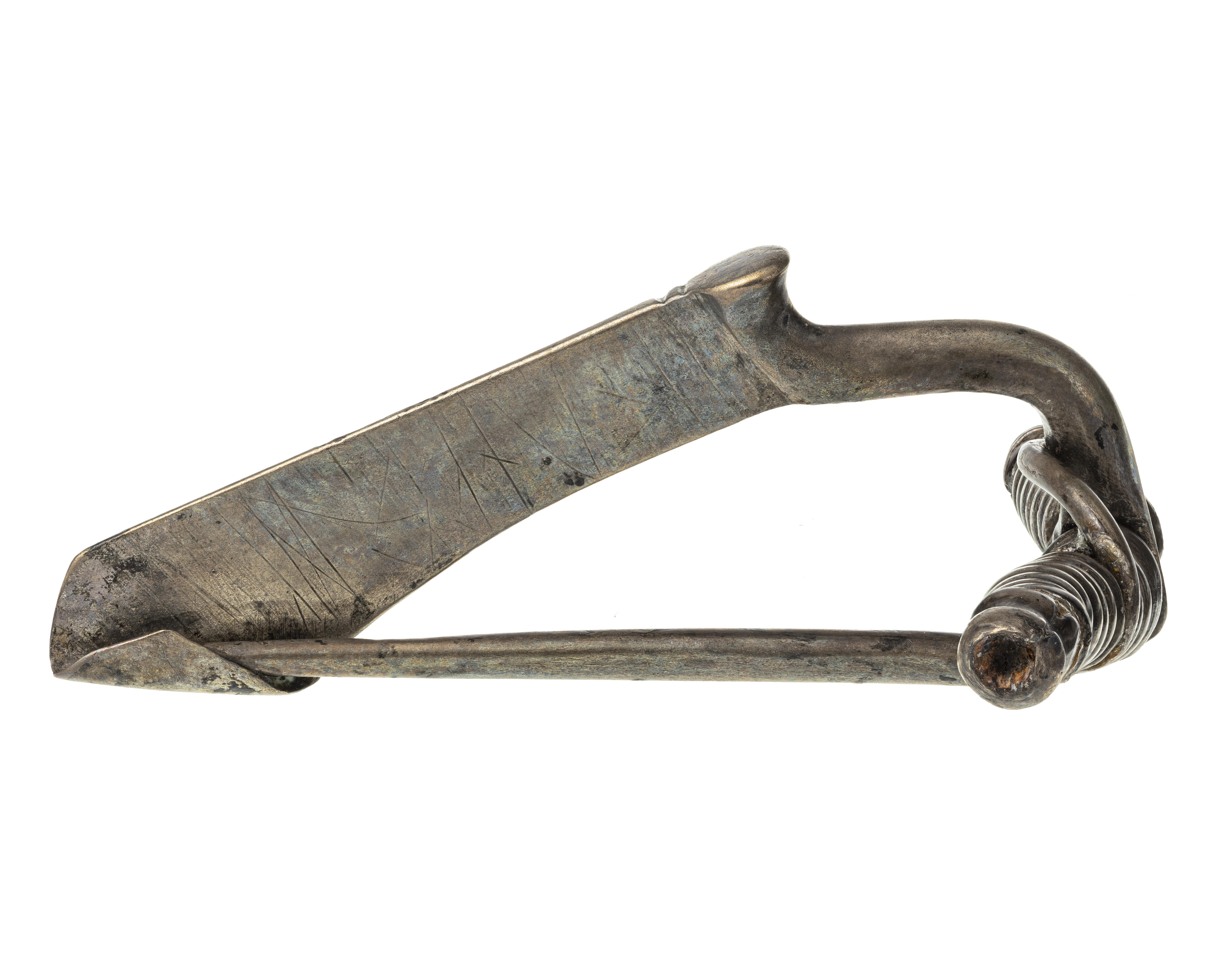
Crossbow fibula with runes.

Gårdlösa is the site of an Iron Age settlement in the parish of Smedstorp in Skåne, Sweden. It was inhabited briefly during the late Nordic Bronze Age, and from the 1st century BC–11th century AD.

A woman's grave from the Roman Iron Age was discovered in Gårdlösa in 1949. The grave contained a silver fibula on which there was a runic inscription. Between 1963 and 1976, archaeological excavations were carried out on the house foundations, grave fields, and a shrine. The rich and varied material uncovered has enabled scholars to perform cross-domain studies of the inhabitants' social, economic and religious life, giving a good picture of an Iron Age agricultural settlement and its resources.

There are two stone circles; two irregularly shaped cobble-clad graves and a smaller one; and a circular formation of stones from the late Vendel Age or the Viking Age.
