= Erilaz =

Proto-Norse word, translated as magician or rune master

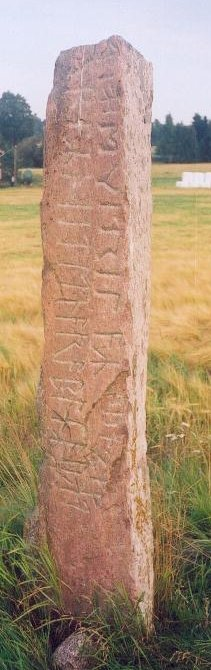
The Järsberg Runestone is from the 6th century and contains the statement: ek erilaz.

Erilaz or Erilaʀ is a Migration period Proto-Norse word attested on various Elder Futhark inscriptions, which has often been interpreted to mean "magician" or "rune master", i.e., one who is capable of writing runes to magical effect. However, as Mees has shown, the word is an ablaut variant of earl, and is also thought to be linguistically related to the name of the tribe of the Heruli, so it is probably merely an old Germanic military title (see etymology below).

== Etymology ==
This word is likeliest the Proto-Germanic ancestor of Anglo-Saxon eorl (Modern English earl) and its relatives, meaning "man, warrior, noble". The word erilaz is likely a derivative of *erǭ sb.f. "fight, battle", thus the interpretation "one who fights, warrior", though it has also been connected to *arô sb.m. "eagle".

Historical instances:

- Latin: Heruli (dating from around 250 AD onwards)
- Greek: Eruloi (dating from around 250 AD onwards)
- Runic: Erilaz (dating from around 200 AD - 400 AD)

== Inscriptions ==
=== Lindholm "amulet" ===
The Lindholm "amulet" (DR 261 $U) is a bone piece found in Skåne, dated to the 2nd to 4th centuries. The inscription contains the word Erilaz.

=== Funen shaft ===
The Kragehul I (DR 196 U) spear-shaft found in Funen that bears the inscription:

ekerilazasugisalasmuhahaitegagaga […]
ek erilaz asugisalas muha haite, gagaga […]

Which is interpreted as "I, the earl of Āsugīsal, am called Muha," followed by some sort of battle cry or chant ("gagaga"). Āsugīsalaz contains ansu-, "god", and gīsalaz, "pledge". Muha may either be a personal name, or a word meaning "retainer" or similar. The runes of gagaga are displayed as a row of three bindrunes based on the X-shape of the g rune with side-twigs attached to its extremities for the a. A similar sequence gægogæ is found on the Undley bracteate.

=== Other items ===
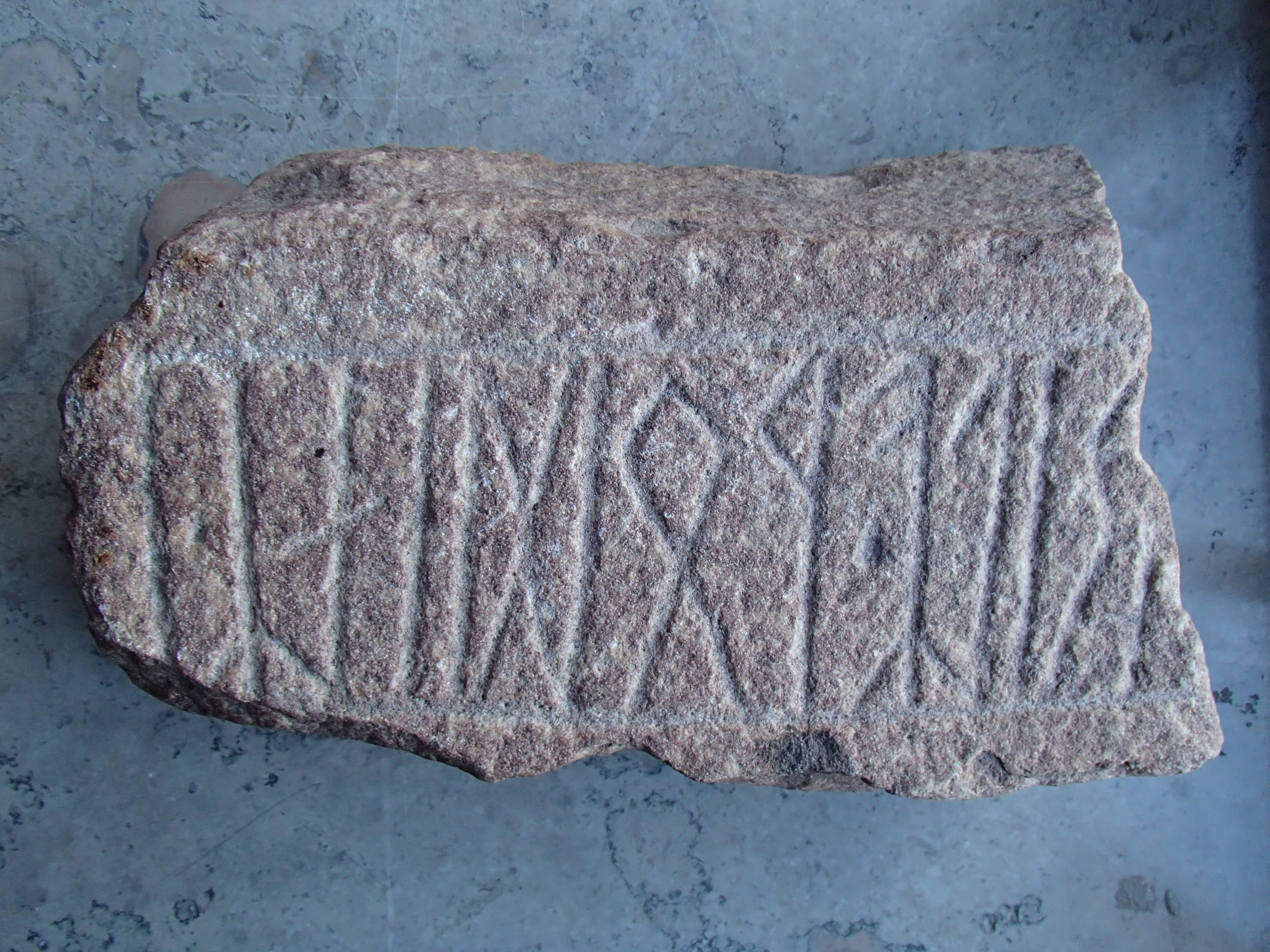
rila͡z (read from right to left).

- Strängnäs stone: …rila͡z
- Bracteates Eskatorp-F and Väsby-F have e[k]erilaz = "I [am] a Herulian"
- Bratsberg clasp: ekerilaz
- Veblungsnes:ekirilazwiwila
- Rosseland (N KJ69 U): ekwagigazirilaz
- Järsberg Runestone (Vr 1): ekerilaz
- By (N KJ71 U): ekirilaz
- The Etelheim clasp has mkmrlawrta read as ek erla wrta "I, Erla, wrote this"; Runic e and m are similar to each other.
- Trollhättan bracteate (found in 2009): ekerilaʀ • mariþeubaʀhaite • wraitalaþo
