= Stentoften Runestone =

Runestone

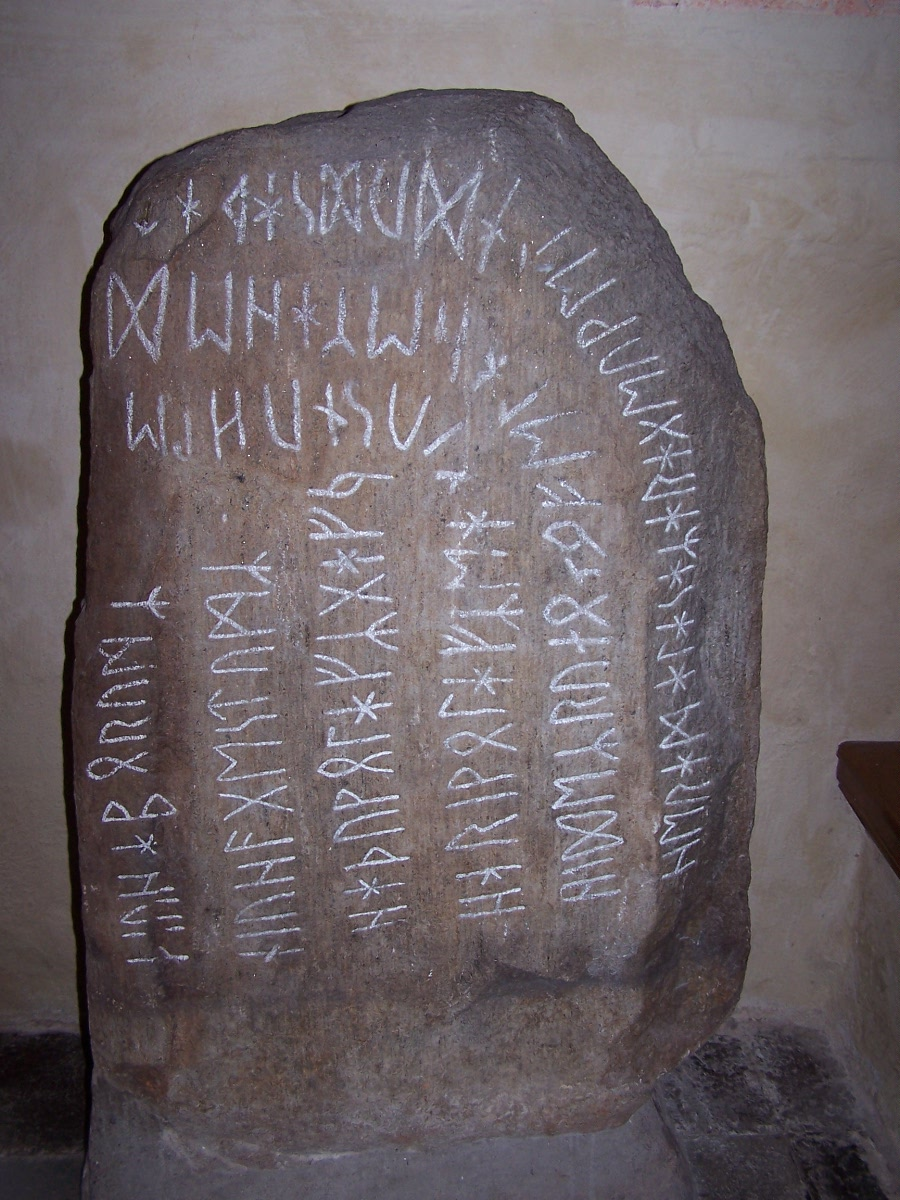
- Writing: Elder Futhark
- Created: 500-700AD
- Discovered: 1823; Stentoften, Blekinge, Sweden
- Discovered by: O. Hammer
- Rundata ID: DR 357
- Runemaster: Unknown

Text – Native
- Proto-Norse : <niuha>borumz <niuha>gestumz Haþuwulfz gaf j[ar], Hariwulfz ... ... haidiz runono, felh eka hedra niu habrumz, niu hangistumz Haþuwulfz gaf j[ar], Hariwulfz ... ... haidiz runono, felh eka hedra ginnurunoz. Hermalausaz argiu, Weladauþs, sa þat briutiþ.

Translation
- (To the) <niuha>dwellers (and) <niuha>guests Haþuwulfar gave ful year, Hariwulfar ... ... I, master of the runes(?) conceal here nine bucks, nine stallions, Haþuwulfar gave fruitful year, Hariwulfar ... ... I, master of the runes(?) conceal here runes of power. Incessantly (plagued by) maleficence, (doomed to) insidious death (is) he who this breaks.

The Stentoften Runestone, listed in the Rundata catalog as DR 357, is a runestone which contains a curse in Proto-Norse that was discovered in Stentoften, Blekinge, Sweden.

== Inscription ==
English translation provided by Rundata:

niuhAborumz ¶ niuhagestumz ¶ hAþuwolAfz gAf j ¶ hAriwolAfz (m)A--u snuh-e ¶ hidez runono fe(l)(A)h ekA hed¶erA
<niuha>borumz {} <niuha>gestumz {} Haþuwulfz gaf j[ar], {} Hariwulfz ... ... {} haidiz runono, felh eka hedra
(To the) <niuha>dwellers (and) <niuha>guests Haþuwulfar gave ful year, Hariwulfar ... ... I, master of the runes(?) conceal here

niu hAborumz ¶ niu hagestumz ¶ hAþuwolAfz gAf j ¶ hAriwolAfz (m)A--u snuh-e ¶ hidez runono fe(l)(A)h ekA hed¶erA
niu habrumz, {} niu hangistumz {} Haþuwulfz gaf j[ar], {} Hariwulfz ... ... {} haidiz runono, felh eka hedra
nine bucks, nine stallions, Haþuwulfar gave fruitful year, Hariwulfar ... ... I, master of the runes(?) conceal here

ginoronoz
ginnurunoz.
runes of power.

herAmAlAsAz ¶ ArAgeu we(l)Aduds| |sA þAt
Hermalausaz {} argiu, Weladauþs, sa þat
Incessantly (plagued by) maleficence, (doomed to) insidious death (is) he who this

bAriutiþ
briutiþ.
breaks.

== Interpretation ==
In lines AP and AQ, in the phrase "gaf j" ("gave j"), the j-rune is an ideographic rune that stands for the rune name *jēra, meaning "harvest" or "bountiful or fruitful year." One runologist suggests that line AQ is describing an animal sacrifice in return for a good harvest as part of a fertility ritual.

== History ==
The Stentoften runestone was discovered in 1823 by the dean O. Hammer. It was lying down with the inscription facing downwards, surrounded by five sharp larger stones forming a pentagon or a pentagram. Consequently, the stone has been part of a larger monument like the Björketorp Runestone further east. In 1864, the runestone was moved into the church of Sölvesborg.

Most scholars date the inscription to the 7th century and it is carved with a type of runes that form an intermediate version between the Elder Futhark and the Younger Futhark. A characteristic example of this is the a-rune which has the same form as the h-rune of the younger futhark. This is the rune that is transliterated with A. The k-rune, which looks like a Y, is a transition form between and in the two futharks. There are quite few intermediary inscriptions like this one. Three more are known from Blekinge, i.e. the Björketorp Runestone, the Istaby Runestone and the Gummarp Runestone, which were moved to Copenhagen and lost in the Copenhagen Fire of 1728.

The Stentoften, Istaby Runestone and Gummarp Runestone inscriptions can be identified with the same clan through the names that are mentioned on them, and the names are typical for chieftains. The Björketorp Runestone lacks names and is raised some tens of kilometers from the others. However, it is beyond doubt that the Björketorp runestone is connected to them, because in addition to the special runic forms, the same message is given on the Stentoften Runestone. These runestones are probably not carved by the same person, and so it appears that they reflect a specific runic tradition in the Blekinge area during the 7th century. Runologist Michael Schulte suggests that the archaic text of the Stentoften stone is more effective from a dramatic perspective than the younger and more explicit version on the Björketorp stone.

The name Hariwulfa is a combination of hari meaning "warrior" and wulafa "wolf," while the haþu of Haþuwulfz means "battle." It has been suggested that the assignment of such lycophoric names may have been related to ritualistic practices and religious wolf-symbolism used in the initiation of young warriors. A shortened form of the name Hariwulfa survived into the Viking Age and is attested in the inscription on the Hærulf Runestone.

== See also ==
- Runic magic

== Sources ==
- Gräslund, Anne-Sofie (2006). "Wolves, Serpents and Birds: Their Symbolic Meaning in Old Norse Belief". In Andrén, Anders; Jennbert, Kristina; et al. (eds.). Old Norse Religion in Long-Term Perspectives: Origins, Changes, and Interactions. Lund: Nordic Academic Press. pp. 124–129. ISBN 91-89116-81-X.
- Jacobsen, Lis; Moltke, Erik (1941). Danmarks Runeindskrifter. Vol. 3.
- Looijenga, Tineke (2003). Texts & Contexts of the Oldest Runic Inscriptions. Leiden: Koninklijke Brill NV. ISBN 90-04-12396-2.
- MacLeod, Mindy; Mees, Bernard (2006). Runic Amulets and Magic Objects. Boydell Press. ISBN 1-84383-205-4.
- Sundqvist, Olof; Hultgård, Anders (2004). "The Lycophoric Names of the 6th to 7th Century Blekinge Runestones and the Problem of Their Ideological Background". In van Nahl, Astrid; Elmevik, Lennart et seq. (eds.). Namenwelten: Orts- und Personennamen in Historischer Sicht. Berlin: Walter de Gruyter. pp. 583–602. ISBN 3-11-018108-8.
- Schulte, Michael (2008). "Stylistic variation in runic inscriptions?". Arkiv för nordisk filologi.
- Thorngren, Karl-Gösta: Runstenar i Blekinge. Blekingeboken 1942. pp. 63–96.
- Rundata
