= Björketorp Runestone =

Runestone

Coordinates: 56°12′09″N 15°22′48″E

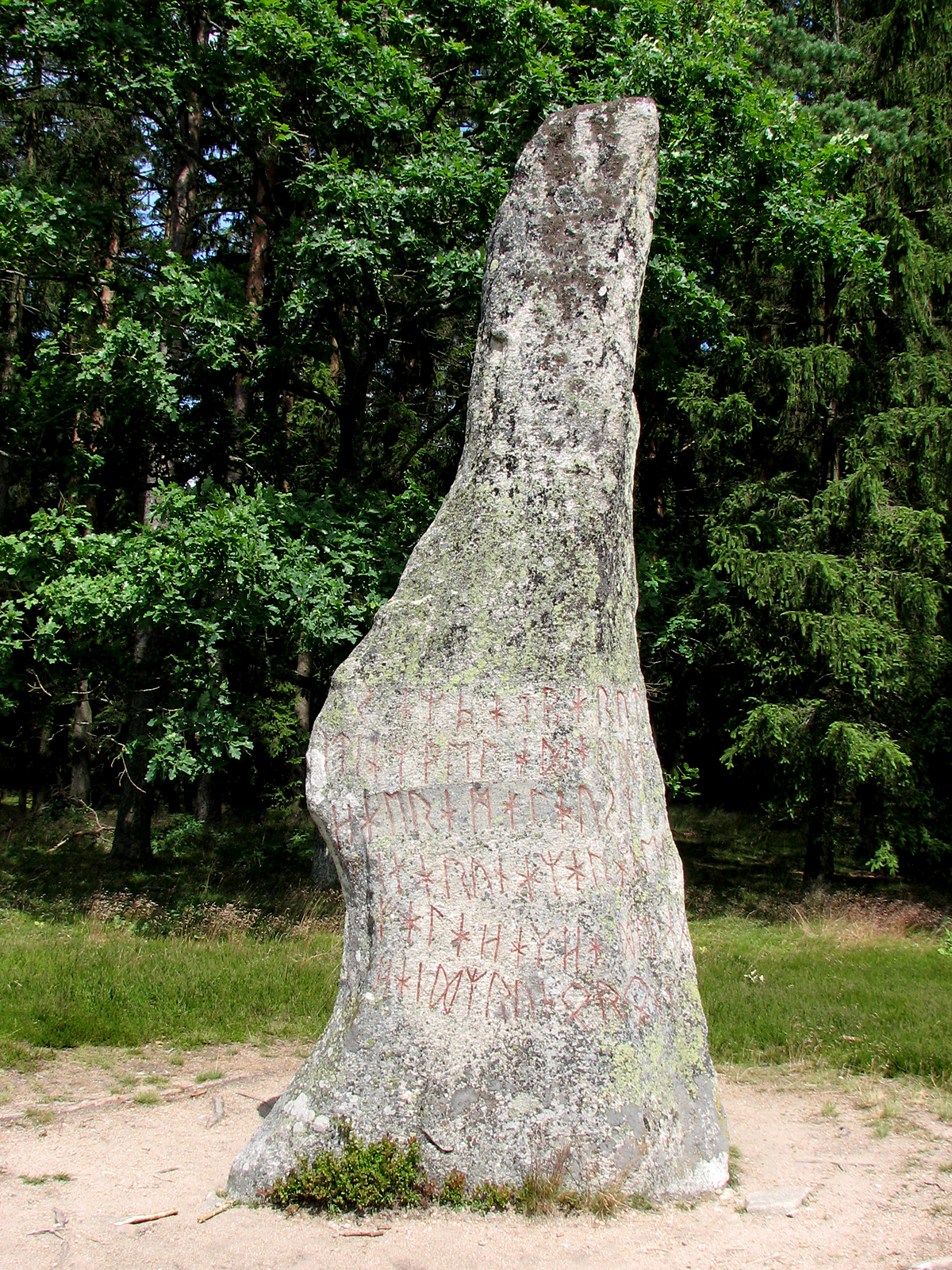
- Created: 500-700AD
- Discovered: Björketorp, Blekinge, Sweden
- Rundata ID: DR 360
- Runemaster: Unknown

Text – Native
- Proto-Norse : Haidz runo runu, falh'k hedra ginnarunaz. Argiu hermalausz, ... weladauþe, saz þat brytz. Uþarba spa.

Translation
- I, master of the runes(?) conceal here runes of power. Incessantly (plagued by) maleficence, (doomed to) insidious death (is) he who breaks this (monument). I prophesy destruction / prophecy of destruction.

The Björketorp Runestone (DR 360 U) in Blekinge, Sweden.

It is one of the world's tallest runestones measuring 4.2 metres in height.

== Inscription ==
The runes were made in the 6th or the 7th century and in Proto-Norse (a similar message is given on the Stentoften Runestone). It is found on two sides. The shorter message appears to say "I foresee perdition" or "prediction of perdition". The message of the other side is also debated.

hAidz runo ronu fAlAhAk hAiderA ginArunAz ArAgeu hAerAmAlAusz utiAz welAdAude sAz þAt bArutz
Haidz runo runu, falh'k hedra ginnarunaz. Argiu hermalausz, ... weladauþe, saz þat brytz.
I, master of the runes(?) conceal here runes of power. Incessantly (plagued by) maleficence, (doomed to) insidious death (is) he who breaks this (monument).

uþArAbA sbA
Uþarba spa.
I prophesy destruction / prophecy of destruction.

Swedish: "Mäktiga runors hemlighet dolde jag här, kraftfulla runor. Den som bryter detta minnesmärke skall ständigt plågas av arghet. Svekfull död ska träffa honom. Jag spår fördärv".

== Menhirs ==
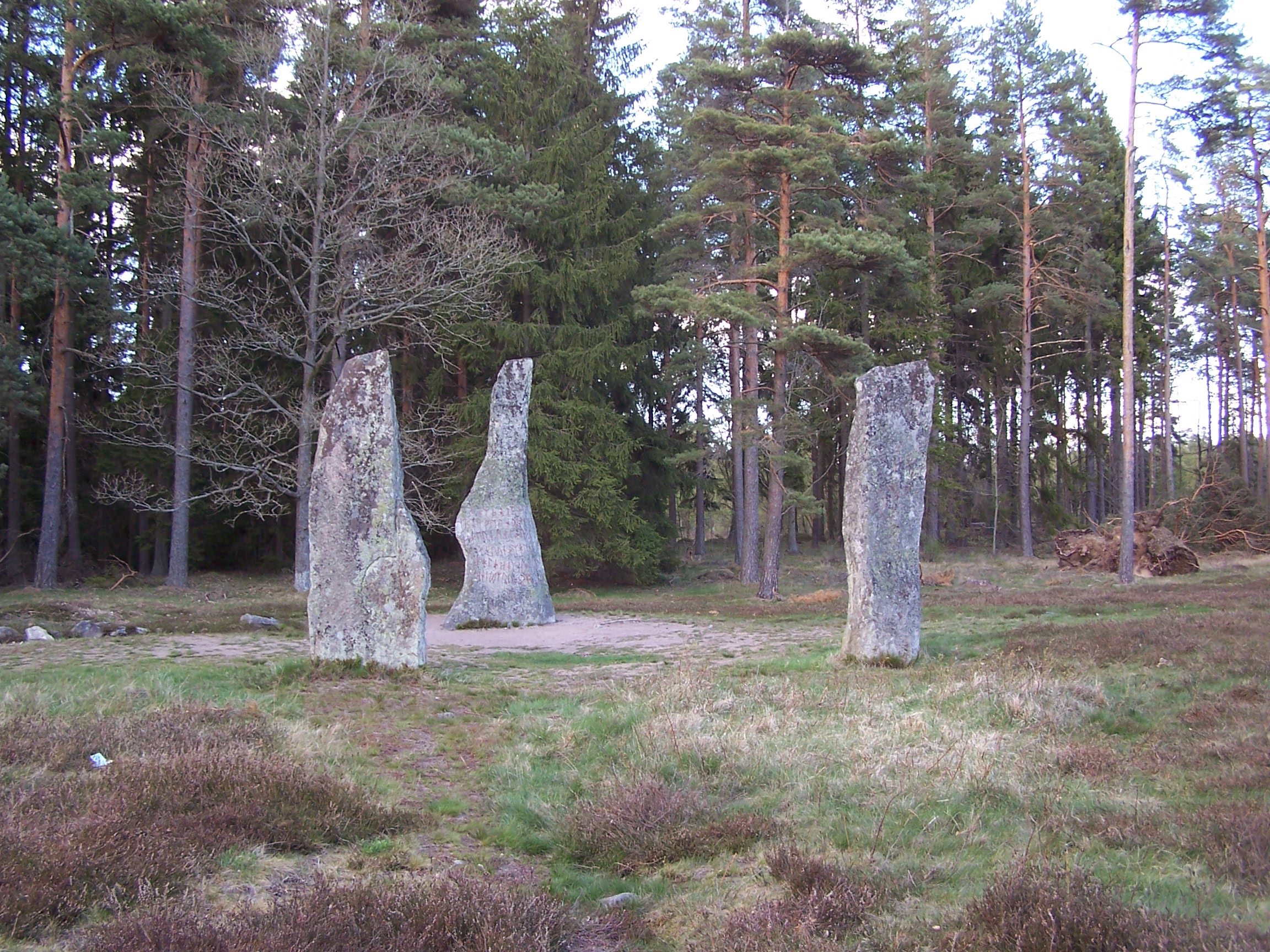
The menhirs

The runestone is paired with two high uninscribed menhirs.

== Analysis ==
Most scholars date the inscription to the 7th century and it is carved with a type of runes that form an intermediate version between the Elder Futhark and the Younger Futhark. A characteristic example of this is the a-rune which has the same form as the h-rune of the younger futhark. This is the rune that is transliterated with A. The k-rune, which looks like a Y is a transition form between and in the two futharks. There are quite a few intermediary inscriptions like this one. Three more are known from Blekinge, i.e. the Stentoften Runestone, the Istaby Runestone and the Gummarp Runestone, which was moved to Copenhagen and lost in the Copenhagen Fire of 1728.

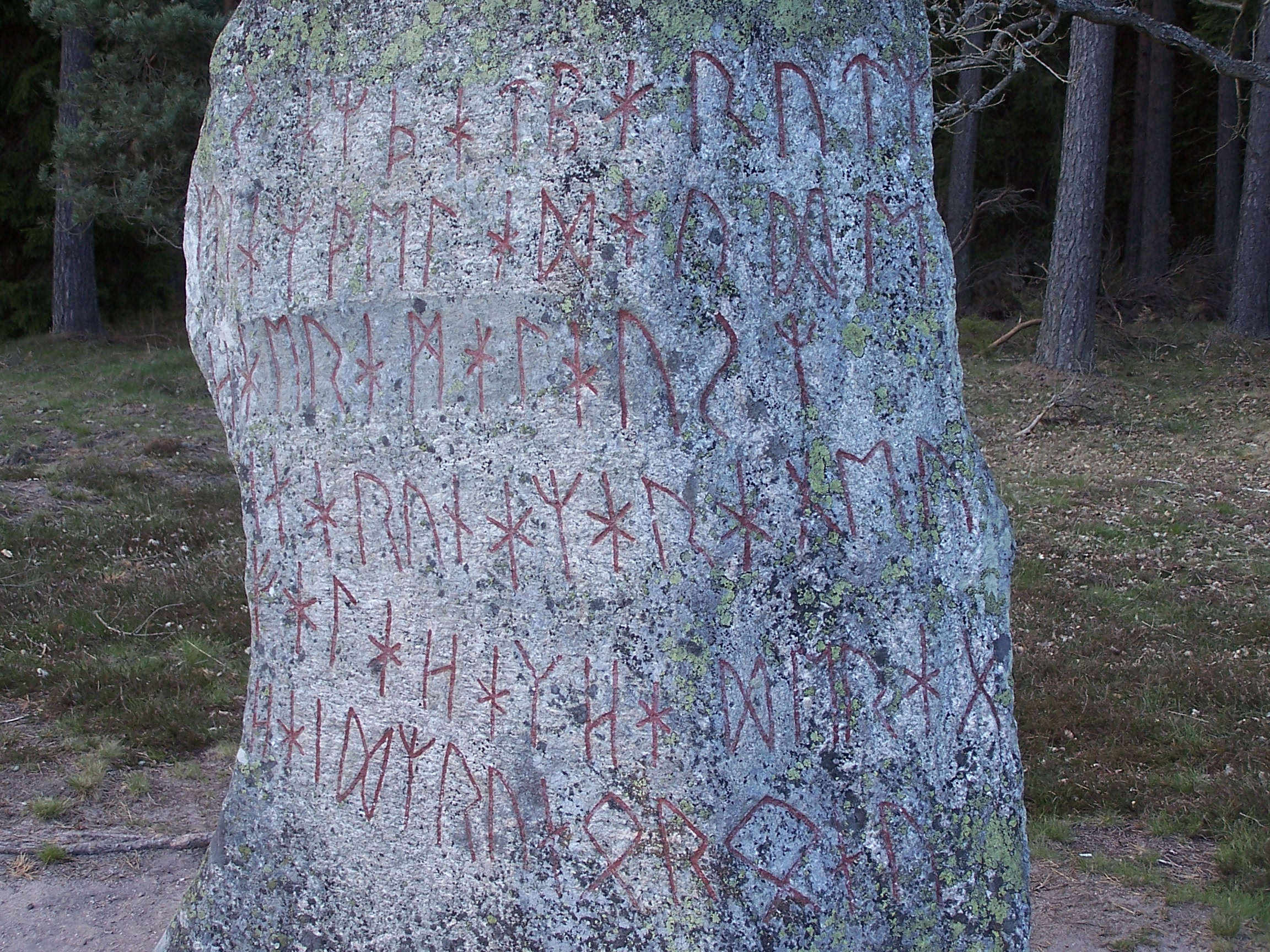
Detail showing the inscription on DR 360.

The Stentoften, Istaby and Gummarp inscriptions can be identified with the same clan through the names that are mentioned on them, and the names are typical for chieftains. The Björketorp Runestone lacks names and is raised some tens of km from the others. However, it is beyond doubt that the Björketorp runestone is connected to them, because in addition to the special runic forms, the same message is given on the Stentoften Runestone.

The runestones were not carved by the same man, and so it appears that the runestone reflects a specific tradition in Blekinge during the 7th century. Compared to the Stentoften inscription, the one on the Björketorp stone has a fuller, more formal and less archaic style.

Scholars are not in agreement on the purpose of the runestone. It has been suggested that the runestone is a grave and that the curse is intended to protect it. However, in 1914, there were archaeological excavations which did not present any finds either by the runestone or in the stone circle. To counter this, it has been suggested that the runestone is a Cenotaph, i.e. a memorial far from the real burial. A second suggestion is that it was a shrine for Odin or for fertility. A third suggestion is that the runestone marks a border between the Swedes and the Danes.

== See also ==
- List of runestones
- Rundata
