= Month =

Unit of time, usually 28 to 31 days

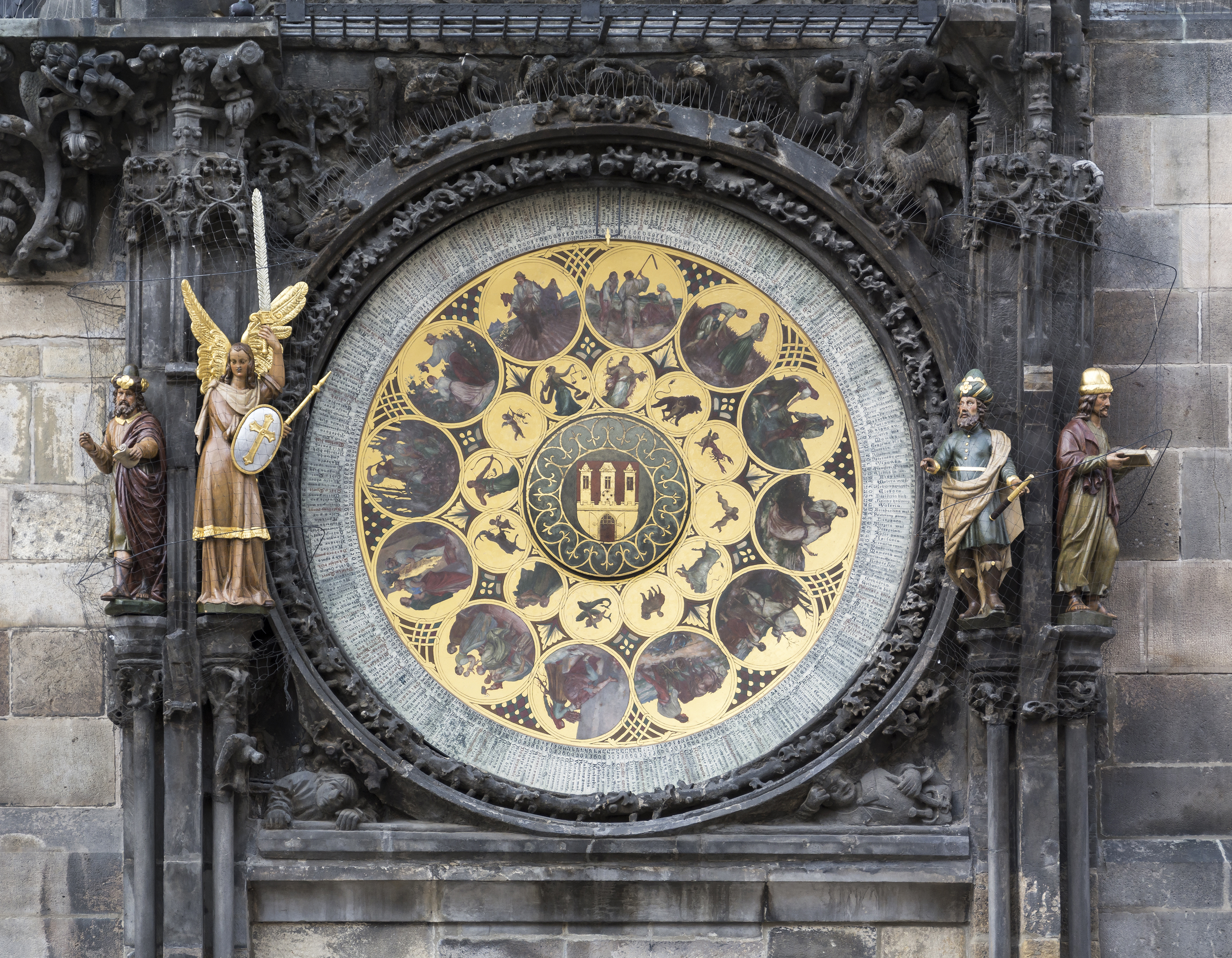
Among its many features, the Prague astronomical clock has medallions to represent the months

A month is a unit of time, used with calendars, that is approximately as long as a natural phase cycle of the Moon; the words month and Moon are cognates. The traditional concept of months arose with the cycle of Moon phases; such lunar months ("lunations") are synodic months and last approximately 29.53 days, making for roughly 12.37 such months in one Earth year. From excavated tally sticks, researchers have deduced that people counted days in relation to the Moon's phases as early as the Paleolithic age. Synodic months, based on the Moon's orbital period with respect to the Earth–Sun line, are still the basis of many calendars today and are used to divide the year.

Calendars that developed from the Roman calendar system, such as the internationally used Gregorian calendar, divide the year into 12 months, each of which lasts between 28 and 31 days. The names of the months were Anglicized from various Latin names and events important to Rome, except for the months 9–12, which are named after the Latin numerals 7–10 (septem, octo, novem, and decem) because they were originally the seventh through tenth months in the Roman calendar. In the modern Gregorian calendar, the only month with a variable number of days is the second month, February, which has 29 days during a leap year and 28 days otherwise.

== Types of months in astronomy ==
The following types of months are mainly of significance in astronomy. Most of them (but not the distinction between sidereal and tropical months) were first recognized in Babylonian lunar astronomy.

1. The sidereal month is defined as the Moon's orbital period in a non-rotating frame of reference (which on average is equal to its rotation period in the same frame). It is about 27.32166 days (27 days, 7 hours, 43 minutes, 11.6 seconds). It is closely equal to the time it takes the Moon to twice pass a "fixed" star (different stars give different results because all have a very small proper motion and are not really fixed in position).
2. A synodic month is the most familiar lunar cycle, defined as the time interval between two consecutive occurrences of a particular phase (such as new moon or full moon) as seen by an observer on Earth. The mean length of the synodic month is 29.53059 days (29 days, 12 hours, 44 minutes, 2.8 seconds). Due to the eccentricity of the lunar orbit around Earth (and to a lesser degree, the Earth's elliptical orbit around the Sun), the length of a synodic month can vary by up to seven hours.
3. The tropical month is the average time for the Moon to pass twice through the same equinox point of the sky. It is 27.32158 days, very slightly shorter than the sidereal month (27.32166) days, because of precession of the equinoxes.
4. An anomalistic month is the average time the Moon takes to go from perigee to perigee—the point in the Moon's orbit when it is closest to Earth. An anomalistic month is about 27.55455 days on average.
5. The draconic month, draconitic month, or nodal month is the period in which the Moon returns to the same node of its orbit; the nodes are the two points where the Moon's orbit crosses the plane of the Earth's orbit. Its duration is about 27.21222 days on average.

A synodic month is longer than a sidereal month because the Earth-Moon system is orbiting the Sun in the same direction as the Moon is orbiting the Earth. The Sun moves eastward with respect to the stars (as does the Moon) and it takes about 2.2 days longer for the Moon to return to the same apparent position with respect to the Sun.

An anomalistic month is longer than a sidereal month because the perigee moves in the same direction as the Moon is orbiting the Earth, one revolution in nine years. Therefore, the Moon takes a little longer to return to perigee than to return to the same star.

A draconic month is shorter than a sidereal month because the nodes move in the opposite direction as the Moon is orbiting the Earth, one revolution in 18.6 years. Therefore, the Moon returns to the same node slightly earlier than it returns to the same star.

== Calendrical consequences ==
A simple lunar calendar may be based on the initial approximation that 2 lunations last 59 solar days: a 30-day full month followed by a 29-day hollow month – but this is only roughly accurate.

Furthermore, because the synodic month does not fit easily into the solar (or 'tropical') year – 12 lunations comprise about 10 or 11 days fewer than does a solar year – accurate, rule-based lunisolar calendars that combine the two cycles are complicated. The most common solution to this problem is either to intercalate (correct) with several epagomenal days each year or to insert a thirteenth leap month every two or three years, if synchronicity with the solar year is desired. The former was used by the Ancient Egyptian calendar and its descendants: the latter is the arrangement used with the Chinese calendar, for example.

Such an approach is formalized in the Metonic cycle, which takes advantage of the fact that 235 lunations are approximately 19 tropical years (which add up to not quite 6,940 days): 12 years have 12 lunar months, and 7 years are 13 lunar months long. However, a Metonic calendar based year will drift against the seasons by about one day every 2 centuries. Metonic calendars include the calendar used in the Antikythera Mechanism about 21 centuries ago, the Hebrew calendar and the Christian Liturgical calendars that are used to determine the date of Easter.

Alternatively in a pure lunar calendar, years are defined as always having 12 lunations, so a year is 354 or 355 days long: the Islamic calendar is the prime example. Consequently, an Islamic year is about 11 days shorter than a solar year and cycles through the seasons in about 33 solar = 34 lunar years: the Islamic New Year has a different Gregorian calendar date in each (solar) year.

Purely solar calendars often have months which no longer relate to the phase of the Moon, but are based only on the motion of the Sun relative to the equinoxes and solstices, or are purely conventional, as in the widely used Gregorian calendar.

== Months in various calendars ==
=== Beginning of the lunar month ===
The Hellenic calendars, the Hebrew Lunisolar calendar and the Islamic Lunar calendar started the month with the first appearance of the thin crescent of the new moon.

However, the motion of the Moon in its orbit is very complicated and its period is not constant. The date and time of this actual observation depends on the exact geographical longitude as well as latitude, atmospheric conditions, the visual acuity of the observers, etc. Therefore, the beginning and lengths of months defined by observation cannot be accurately predicted.

While some like orthodox Islam and the Jewish Karaites still rely on actual moon observations, reliance on astronomical calculations and tabular methods is increasingly common in practice.

=== Ahom calendar ===
The Ahom people live in Assam, eastern India. Their sexagenary calendar known as Lak-ni has 12 months and an additional leap year month. The first month is Duin Shing.

No.	Name	Ahom script	Gregorian month
1	Duin-Shing	𑜓𑜢𑜤𑜃𑜫 𑜋𑜢𑜂𑜫	November-December
2	Duin-Kam	𑜓𑜢𑜤𑜃𑜫 𑜀𑜪	December-January
3	Duin-Tsam	𑜓𑜢𑜤𑜃𑜫 𑜏𑜪	January-February
4	Duin-Shi	𑜓𑜢𑜤𑜃𑜫 𑜏𑜢	February-March
5	Duin-Ha	𑜓𑜢𑜤𑜃𑜫 𑜑𑜡	March-April
6	Duin-Rok	𑜓𑜢𑜤𑜃𑜫 𑜍𑜤𑜀𑜫	April-May
7	Duin-Shit	𑜓𑜢𑜤𑜃𑜫 𑜋𑜢𑜄𑜫	May-June
8	Duin-paet	𑜓𑜢𑜤𑜃𑜫 𑜆𑜢𑜤𑜄𑜫	June-July
9	Duin-kauo	𑜓𑜢𑜤𑜃𑜫 𑜀𑜰𑜫	July-August
10	Duin-sip	𑜓𑜢𑜤𑜃𑜫 𑜏𑜢𑜆𑜫	August-September
11	Duin-tsip-it	𑜓𑜢𑜤𑜃𑜫 𑜏𑜢𑜆𑜫 𑜒𑜪𑜄𑜫	September-October
12	Duin-sip-song	𑜓𑜢𑜤𑜃𑜫 𑜏𑜢𑜆𑜫 𑜁	October-November

=== Roman calendar ===
The Roman calendar was reformed several times, the last three enduring reforms during historical times. The last three reformed Roman calendars are called the Julian, Augustan, and Gregorian; all had the same number of days in their months. Despite other attempts, the names of the months after the Augustan calendar reform have persisted, and the number of days in each month (except February) have remained constant since before the Julian reform. The Gregorian calendar, like the Roman calendars before it, has twelve months, whose Anglicized names are:

Order	Name	Number of days
1	January	31
2	February	28; 29 in leap years
3	March	31
4	April	30
5	May	31
6	June	30
7	July formerly Quinctilis	31
8	August formerly Sextilis	31
9	September	30
10	October	31
11	November	30
12	December	31

On top of the knuckles (yellow): 31 days Between the knuckles (blue): 30 days February (red) has 28 or 29 days.

The white keys of the musical keyboard correspond to months with 31 day months. (F corresponds to January.)

The famous mnemonic Thirty days hath September is a common way of teaching the lengths of the months in the English-speaking world. The knuckles of the four fingers of one's hand and the spaces between them can be used to remember the lengths of the months. By making a fist, each month will be listed as one proceeds across the hand. All months landing on a knuckle are 31 days long and those landing between them are 30 days long, with variable February being the remembered exception. When the knuckle of the index finger is reached (July), go over to the first knuckle on the other fist, held next to the first (or go back to the first knuckle) and continue with August. This physical mnemonic has been taught to primary school students for many decades, if not centuries.

This cyclical pattern of month lengths matches the musical keyboard alternation of wide white keys (31 days) and narrow black keys (30 days). The note F corresponds to January, the note F^{♯} corresponds to February, the exceptional 28–29 day month, and so on.

==== Numerical relations ====
The mean month-length in the Gregorian calendar is 30.436875 days.

Any five consecutive months that do not include February contain 153 days.

==== Calends, nones, and ides ====
Months in the pre-Julian Roman calendar included:

- Intercalaris an intercalary month occasionally embedded into February, to realign the calendar.
- Quintilis, later renamed to Julius in honour of Julius Caesar.
- Sextilis, later renamed to Augustus in honour of Augustus.

The Romans divided their months into three parts, which they called the calends, the nones, and the ides. Their system is somewhat intricate. The ides occur on the thirteenth day in eight of the months, but in March, May, July, and October, they occur on the fifteenth. The nones always occur 8 days (one Roman 'week') before the ides, i.e., on the fifth or the seventh. The calends are always the first day of the month, (Note: More precisely, the calends were when the name of a month first began being used when referring to dates. Instead of counting the number of days elapsed, the Romans used a countdown to number their dates. See the article Roman calendar for a more detailed explanation.) and before Julius Caesar's reform fell sixteen days (two Roman weeks) after the ides (except the ides of February and the intercalary month).

==== Relations between dates, weekdays, and months in the Gregorian calendar ====
Within a month, the following dates fall on the same day of the week:

- 01, 08, 15, 22, and 29 (e.g., in January 2022, all these dates fell on a Saturday)
- 02, 09, 16, 23, and 30 (e.g., in January 2022, all these dates fell on a Sunday)
- 03, 10, 17, 24, and 31 (e.g., in January 2022, all these dates fell on a Monday)
- 04, 11, 18, and 25 (e.g., in January 2022, all these dates fell on a Tuesday)
- 05, 12, 19, and 26 (e.g., in January 2022, all these dates fell on a Wednesday)
- 06, 13, 20, and 27 (e.g., in January 2022, all these dates fell on a Thursday)
- 07, 14, 21, and 28 (e.g., in January 2022, all these dates fell on a Friday)

Some months have the same date/weekday structure.

In a non-leap year:

- January/October (e.g., in 2022, they began on a Saturday)
- February/March/November (e.g., in 2022, they began on a Tuesday)
- April/July (e.g., in 2022, they began on a Friday)
- September/December (e.g., in 2022, they began on a Thursday)
- 1 January and 31 December fall on the same weekday (e.g. in 2022 on a Saturday)

In a leap year:

- February/August (e.g., in 2020, they began on a Saturday)
- March/November (e.g., in 2020, they began on a Sunday)
- January/April/July (e.g., in 2020, they began on a Wednesday)
- September/December (e.g., in 2020, they began on a Tuesday)
- 29 February (the leap day) falls on the same weekday like 1, 8, 15, 22 February and 1 August (see above; e.g. in 2020 on a Saturday)

=== Hebrew calendar ===
Variants of the traditional Hebrew calendar are known from the 1st millennium BCE. Around 350CE it adopted the metonic cycle. Today it is used for religious needs only, while daily life is conducted according to the Gregorian calendar.

In the 1st millennium BCE, the year began in the month of Nissan. From the 2nd century BCE, the year begins in Tishrei. Today the first day of Tishrei is the first day of the new year.

The Hebrew calendar has 12 or 13 months.

1. Nisan, 30 days ניסן
2. Iyar, 30 days אייר
3. Sivan, 30 days סיון
4. Tammuz, 29 days תמוז
5. Av, 30 days אב
6. Elul, 29 days אלול
7. Tishrei, 30 days תשרי
8. Marheshvan (Heshvan), 29/30 days (חשון) מַרְחֶשְׁוָן
9. Kislev, 30/29 days כסלו
10. Tevet, 29 days טבת
11. Shevat, 30 days שבט
12. Adar 1, 30 days, intercalary month אדר א
13. Adar 2, 29 days אדר ב

In leap years, an extra month is added, being Adar 1. It is added 7 times in every 19 years long cycle. In ordinary years, Adar 2 is simply called Adar.

=== Islamic calendars ===
Two principal religious calendars are used in the Islamic world, the lunar Hijri calendar (used by the majority Sunni Islam tradition and thus more commonly known in the West as "the Islamic calendar" although it is not the only one) and the solar Hijri calendar (used by the minority Shia Islam tradition and also known as the Persian calendar).

The 12 months in the lunar Hijri calendar each begin at the first crescent of the new Moon and thus each lasts for fewer than 30 days. They are named as follows:

Sacred months
No.	Name	Arabic	Meaning	Note
1	al-Muḥarram	ٱلْمُحَرَّم	forbidden	A sacred month, so called because battle and all kinds of fighting are forbidden (ḥarām) during this month. Muharram includes Ashura, the tenth day.
2	Ṣafar	صَفَر	void	Supposedly named this because pre-Islamic Arab houses were empty this time of year while their occupants gathered food.
3	Rabīʿ al-ʾAwwal	رَبِيع ٱلْأَوَّل	the first spring	Also means to graze, because cattle were grazed during this month. Also a very holy month of celebration for many Muslims, as it was the month Muhammad was born.
4	Rabīʿ ath-Thānī or Rabīʿ al-ʾĀkhir	رَبِيع ٱلثَّانِي or رَبِيع ٱلْآخِر	the second spring, the last spring	
5	Jumādā l-ʾŪlā	جُمَادَى ٱلْأُولَى	the first of parched land	Often considered the pre-Islamic summer. Jumādā may also be related to a verb meaning "to freeze" and another account relates that water would freeze during this time of year.
6	Jumādā th-Thāniya or Jumādā l-ʾĀkhira	جُمَادَى ٱلثَّانِيَة or جُمَادَى ٱلْآخِرَة	the second of parched land, the last of parched land	
7	Rajab	رَجَب	respect, honour	This is the second sacred month in which fighting is forbidden. Rajab may also be related to a verb meaning "to remove", so called because pre-Islamic Arabs would remove the heads of their spears and refrain from fighting.
8	Shaʿbān	شَعْبَان	scattered	Marked the time of year when Arab tribes dispersed to find water. Sha‘bān may also be related to a verb meaning "to be in between two things". Another account relates that it was called thus because the month lies between Rajab and Ramadan.
9	Ramaḍān	رَمَضَان	burning heat	Burning is related to fasting as with an empty stomach one's worldly desire will burn. Supposedly so called because of high temperatures caused by the excessive heat of the sun. Ramaḍān is the most venerated month of the Hijri calendar. During this time, Muslims must fast and not do anything sinful from pre-dawn until sunset and should give charity to the poor and needy.
10	Shawwāl	شَوَّال	raised	Female camels would normally be in calf at this time of year and raise their tails. At the first day of this month, the Eid al-Fitr, "Festival of Breaking the Fast" begins, marking the end of fasting and the end of Ramadan.
11	Dhū l-Qaʿda	ذُو ٱلْقَعْدَة	the one of truce/sitting	This is a holy month during which war is banned. People are allowed to defend themselves if attacked.
12	Dhū l-Ḥijja	ذُو ٱلْحِجَّة	the one of pilgrimage	During this month Muslim pilgrims from all around the world congregate at Mecca to visit the Kaaba. The Hajj is performed on the eighth, ninth and the tenth of this month. Day of Arafah takes place on the ninth of the month. Eid al-Adha, the "Festival of the Sacrifice", begins on the tenth day and ends on the thirteenth, and this is a fourth holy month during which war is banned.

The solar Hijri calendar, used in Iran as the religious and civil calendar and elsewhere in the region for religious and farming purposes, begins each year at the spring equinox, as observationally determined at Tehran. It too has 12 months.

Order	Days	Persian (Iran)		Dari (Afghanistan)		Tajik		Kurdish (Iran)		Pashto		Azerbaijani		Gregorian range	Zodiac sign
Order	Days	Native script	Romanized	Native script	Romanized	Native script	Romanized	Sorani script	Kurmanji script	Native script	Romanized	Arabic script	Latin script	Gregorian range	Zodiac sign
01	31	فروردین	Farvardin	حمل	Hamal	Фарвардин / Ҳамал	Farvardin / Hamal	خاکەلێوە	Xakelêwe	وری	Wrai	آغلار-گۆلر	Ağlar-gülər	March – April	♈️Aries
02	31	اردیبهشت	Ordibehesht	ثور	Sawr	Урдибиҳишт / Савр	Urdibihisht / Savr	گوڵان	Gulan (Banemer)	غويی	Ǧwayai	گۆلن	Gülən	April – May	♉️ Taurus
03	31	خرداد	Khordad	جوزا	Jawzā	Хурдод / Ҷавзо	Khurdod / Javzo	جۆزەردان	Cozerdan	غبرګولی	Ǧbargolai	قؽزاران	Qızaran	May – June	♊️ Gemini
04	31	تیر	Tir	سرطان	Saratān	Тир / Саратон	Tir / Saraton	پووشپەڕ	Pûşper	چنګاښ	Cungāx̌	قوْرا بیشیرن	Qora bişirən	June – July	♋️ Cancer
05	31	مرداد / امرداد	Mordad / Amordad	اسد	Asad	Мурдод / Асад	Murdod / Asad	گەلاوێژ	Gelawêj	زمری	Zmarai	قۇیرۇق دوْغان	Quyruq doğan	July – August	♌️ Leo
06	31	شهریور	Shahrivar	سنبله	Sunbula	Шаҳривар / Сунбула	Shahrivar / Sunbula	خەرمانان	Xermanan	وږی	Wəǵai	زۇمار	Zumar	August – September	♍️ Virgo
07	30	مهر	Mehr	میزان	Mīzān	Меҳр / Мизон	Mehr / Mizon	ڕەزبەر	Rezber	تله	Təla	خزل	Xəzəl	September – October	♎️ Libra
08	30	آبان	Aban	عقرب	ʿAqrab	Обон / Ақраб	Obon / Aqrab	گەڵاڕێزان	Xezelwer (Gelarêzan)	لړم	Laṛam	قؽروْو	Qırov	October – November	♏️ Scorpio
09	30	آذر	Azar	قوس	Qaws	Озар / Қавс	Ozar / Qavs	سەرماوەز	Sermawez	ليندۍ	Lindəi	آذر	Azər	November – December	♐️ Sagittarius
10	30	دی	Dey	جدی	Jadī	Дай / Ҷадӣ	Day / Jadī	بەفرانبار	Befranbar	مرغومی	Marǧumai	چیلله	Çillə	December – January	♑️ Capricorn
11	30	بهمن	Bahman	دلو	Dalwa	Баҳман / Далв	Bahman / Dalv	ڕێبەندان	Rêbendan	سلواغه	Salwāǧa	دوْندۇران	Donduran	January – February	♒️ Aquarius
12	29/30	اسفند / اسپند	Esfand / Espand	حوت	Hūt	Исфанд / Ҳут	Isfand / Hut	ڕەشەمە	Reşeme	كب	Kab	بایرام	Bayram	February – March	♓️ Pisces

=== Arabic calendar ===
Gregorian month		Arabic month	
January	يناير	كانون الثاني	Kanun Al-Thani
February	فبراير	شباط	Shebat
March	مارس	اذار	Adhar
April	ابريل	نيسان	Nisan
May	مايو	أيّار	Ayyar
June	يونيو	حزيران	Ḩazayran
July	يوليو	تمّوز	Tammuz
August	أغسطس	اَب	ʕAb
September	سبتمبر	أيلول	Aylul
October	أكتوبر	تشرين الأول	Tishrin Al-Awwal
November	نوفمبر	تشرين الثاني	Tishrin Al-Thani
December	ديسمبر	كانون الأول	Kanun Al-Awwal

=== Hindu calendar ===
The Hindu calendar has various systems of naming the months. The months in the lunar calendar are:

No.	Sanskrit name	Tamil name	Telugu name	Nepali name	Assamese name
1	Vaiśākha (वैशाख)	Vaikasi (வைகாசி)	Vaisaakhamu (వైశాఖము)	Baisakh (बैशाख)	Bahāg (বহাগ)
2	Jyeṣṭha (ज्येष्ठ)	Aani (ஆனி)	Jyeshttamu (జ్యేష్ఠము)	Jeth (जेष्ठ/जेठ)	Jeth (জেঠ)
3	Ashadha (आषाढ)	Aadi (ஆடி)	Aashaadhamu (ఆషాఢము)	Asaar (आषाढ/असार)	Āsār/Āhār (আষাঢ়/আহাৰ)
4	Śrāvaṇa (श्रावण)	Aavani (ஆவணி)	Sraavanamu (శ్రావణము)	Saaoon (श्रावण/साउन)	Sāoon (শাওণ)
5	Bhadrapada (भाद्रपद)	Purratasi (புரட்டாசி)	Bhaadhrapadamu (భాద్రపదము)	Bhadau (भाद्र|भदौ)	Bhādo (ভাদ)
6	Āśvina (अश्विन)	Aiypasi (ஐப்பசி)	Aasveeyujamu (ఆశ్వయుజము)	Asoj (आश्विन/असोज)	Āhin (আহিন)
7	Kārtika (कार्तिक/कात्तिक)	Kaarthigai (கார்த்திகை)	Kaarthikamu (కార్తీకము)	Kaattick(कार्तिक/ कात्तिक)	Kāti (কাতি)
8	Mārgaśīrṣa (मार्गशीर्ष)	Maargazhi (மார்கழி)	Maargaseershamu (మార్గశిరము)	Mangsir (मार्ग/मंसिर)	Āghun (আঘোণ)
9	Pauṣa (पौष)	Thai (தை)	Pushyamu (పుష్యము)	Push (पौष/पुष/पूस)	Puh (পুহ)
10	Māgha (माघ)	Maasi (மாசி)	Maaghamu (మాఘము)	Magh (माघ)	Māgh (মাঘ)
11	Phālguna (फाल्गुन)	Panguni (பங்குனி)	Phaalgunamu (ఫాల్గుణము)	Faagoon (फाल्गुन/फागुन)	Fāgoon (ফাগুণ)
12	Chaitra (चैत्र)	Chitirai (சித்திரை)	Chaithramu (చైత్రము)	Chait (चैत्र/चैत)	Chot (চ'ত)

These are also the names used in the Indian national calendar for the newly redefined months. Purushottam Maas or Adhik Maas (translit. adhika = 'extra', māsa = 'month') is an extra month in the Hindu calendar that is inserted to keep the lunar and solar calendars aligned. "Purushottam" is an epithet of Vishnu, to whom the month is dedicated.

The names in the solar calendar are just the names of the zodiac sign in which the sun travels. They are

1. Mesha
2. Vrishabha
3. Mithuna
4. Kataka
5. Simha
6. Kanyaa
7. Tulaa
8. Vrishcika
9. Dhanus
10. Makara
11. Kumbha
12. Miina

=== Baháʼí calendar ===
The Baháʼí calendar is the calendar used by the Baháʼí Faith. It is a solar calendar with regular years of 365 days, and leap years of 366 days. Years are composed of 19 months of 19 days each (361 days), plus an extra period of "Intercalary Days" (4 in regular and 5 in leap years). The months are named after the attributes of God. Days of the year begin and end at sundown.

=== Iranian calendar (Persian calendar) ===
The Iranian / Persian calendar, currently used in Iran, also has 12 months. The Persian names are included in the parentheses. It begins on the northern Spring equinox.

1. Farvardin (31 days, فروردین)
2. Ordibehesht (31 days, اردیبهشت)
3. Khordad (31 days, خرداد)
4. Tir (31 days, تیر)
5. Mordad (31 days, مرداد)
6. Shahrivar (31 days, شهریور)
7. Mehr (30 days, مهر)
8. Aban (30 days, آبان)
9. Azar (30 days, آذر)
10. Dey (30 days, دی)
11. Bahman (30 days, بهمن)
12. Esfand (29 days- 30 days in leap year, اسفند)

=== Reformed Bengali calendar ===
The Bengali calendar, used in Bangladesh, follows solar months and it has six seasons. The months and seasons in the calendar are:

No.	Name (Sadhu bhasha)	Name (Eastern)	Name (Rohingya)	Season	Days	Roman months
1	Boishakh (বৈশাখ)	Boishakh (বৈশাখ)	Boicák (বৈশাখ)	Grishmo (গ্রীষ্ম)	31	14 April – May
2	Joishtho (জ্যৈষ্ঠ)	Zoith (জৈঠ)	Zeth (জেঠ)	Grishmo (গ্রীষ্ম)	31	May – June
3	Asharh (আষাঢ়)	A(sha)ŗ (আ(ষা)ঢ়)	Acár (আষাঢ়)	Borsha (বর্ষা)	31	June – July
4	Shrabon (শ্রাবণ)	(S)haon (শাওণ)	Cón (শণ)	Borsha (বর্ষা)	31	July – August
5	Bhadro (ভাদ্র)	Bhado (ভাদ)	Bádo (ভাদ)	Shorot (শরৎ)	31	August – September
6	Aashin (আশ্বিন)	Ashin (আশিন)	Acín (আশিন)	Shorot (শরৎ)	30	September – October
7	Kartik (কার্তিক)	Kati (কাতি)	Hati (হাতি)	Hemonto(হেমন্ত)	30	October – November
8	Ogrohayon (অগ্রহায়ণ)	Aghon (আঘণ)	Óon (অণ)	Hemonto(হেমন্ত)	30	November – December
9	Poush (পৌষ)	Push (পুষ)	Fuc (পুষ)	Sheet (শীত)	30	December – January
10	Magh (মাঘ)	Magh (মাঘ)	Mak (মাক)	Sheet (শীত)	30	January – February
11	Phalgun (ফাল্গুন)	Fagun (ফাগুন)	Fóon (ফঅন)	Boshonto (বসন্ত)	30 (31 in leap years)	February – March
12	Choitro (চৈত্র)	Soit (চৈত)	Soit (চৈত)	Boshonto (বসন্ত)	30	March – April

=== Nanakshahi calendar ===
The months in the Nanakshahi calendar are:

No.	Name	Punjabi	Days	Julian months
1	Chet	ਚੇਤ	31	14 March – 13 April
2	Vaisakh	ਵੈਸਾਖ	31	14 April – 14 May
3	Jeth	ਜੇਠ	31	15 May – 14 June
4	Harh	ਹਾੜ	31	15 June – 15 July
5	Sawan	ਸਾਵਣ	31	16 July – 15 August
6	Bhadon	ਭਾਦੋਂ	30	16 August – 14 September
7	Assu	ਅੱਸੂ	30	15 September – 14 October
8	Katak	ਕੱਤਕ	30	15 October – 13 November
9	Maghar	ਮੱਘਰ	30	14 November – 13 December
10	Poh	ਪੋਹ	30	14 December – 12 January
11	Magh	ਮਾਘ	30	13 January – 11 February
12	Phagun	ਫੱਗਣ	30/31	12 February – 13 March

=== Khmer calendar ===
Different from the Hindu calendar, the Khmer calendar consists of both a lunar calendar and a solar calendar. The solar is used more commonly than the lunar calendar.

Gregorian month				Meaning	Zodiac sign
English	Khmer	UNGEGN transcription	ALA-LC	Meaning	Zodiac sign
January	មករា	Meăkăra	Makarā	មករ (UNGEGN: meăkâ, ALA-LC: makar); "naga"	Capricorn
February	កុម្ភៈ	Kŏmpheă	Kumbhà	ក្អម (UNGEGN: k'âm, ALA-LC: kʿʹam); "clay pitcher"	Aquarius
March	មីនា	Minéa	Mīnā	ត្រី (UNGEGN: trei, ALA-LC: trī); "fish" or "three/third"	Pisces
April	មេសា	Mésa	Mesā	ចៀម (UNGEGN: chiĕm, ALA-LC: ciam); "sheep"	Aries
May	ឧសភា	Ŭsăphéa	Usabhā	គោឈ្មោល (UNGEGN: koŭ chhmoŭl, ALA-LC: go jhmol); "bull"	Taurus
June	មិថុនា	Mĭthŏna	Mithunā	គូ (UNGEGN: ku, ALA-LC: gū); "couple"	Gemini
July	កក្កដា	Kăkkăda	Kakkaṭā	ក្ដាម (UNGEGN: kdam, ALA-LC: kṭām); "crab"	Cancer
August	សីហា	Seiha	Sīhā	សីហៈ (UNGEGN: seihă, ALA-LC: sīhà); "lion"	Leo
September	កញ្ញា	Kânhnha	Kaññā	ក្រមុំ (UNGEGN: krâmŭm, ALA-LC: kramuṃ); "maiden"	Virgo
October	តុលា	Tŏla	Tulā	ជញ្ជីង (UNGEGN: chónhching, ALA-LC: jañjīng); "scales"	Libra
November	វិច្ឆិកា	Vĭchchhĕka	Vicchikā	ខ្ទួយ (UNGEGN: khtuŏy, ALA-LC: khduay); "scorpion"	Scorpio
December	ធ្នូ	Thnu	Dhnū	ធ្នូ (UNGEGN: thnu, ALA-LC: dhnū); "bow", "arc"	Sagittarius

The Khmer lunar calendar most often contains 12 months; however, the eighth month is repeated (as a "leap month") every two or three years, making 13 months instead of 12. Each lunar month has 29 or 30 days. The year normally has then 354 or 384 days (when an intercalary month is added), but the calendar follows the rules of the Gregorian calendar to determine leap years and add a leap day to one month, so the Khmer lunar year may have a total of 354, 355, 384 or 385 days.

No.	Khmer month		
No.	Khmer	UNGEGN transcription	ALA-LC
1	មិគសិរ	Mĭkeăsé	Migasir
2	បុស្ស	Bŏs	Puss
3	មាឃ	Méak	Māgh
4	ផល្គុន	Phálkŭn	Phalgun
5	ចេត្រ	Chêt	Cetr
6	វិសាខ/ពិសាខ	Vĭsakh/Pĭsakh	Visākh/Bisākh
7	ជេស្ឋ	Chés	Jesṭh
8 (8a, 8b)	ឤសាឍ (បឋមសាឍ, ទុតិយាសាឍ)	Asat (Păthămasat, Tŭtĕyasat)	ʿʹāsāḍh (Paṭhamasāḍh, Dutiyāsāḍh)
9	ស្រាពណ៍	Srap	Srābaṇ ̊
10	ភទ្របទ	Phoătreăbŏt	Bhadrapad
11	អស្សុជ	Âssŏch	ʿʹassuj
12	កត្តិក	Kătdœ̆k	Katṭik

=== Thai calendar ===
English name	Thai name	Abbr.	Transcription	Sanskrit word	Zodiac sign
January	มกราคม	ม.ค.	mokarakhom	makara "sea-monster"	Capricorn
February	กุมภาพันธ์	ก.พ.	kumphaphan	kumbha "pitcher, water-pot"	Aquarius
March	มีนาคม	มี.ค.	minakhom	mīna "(a specific kind of) fish"	Pisces
April	เมษายน	เม.ย.	mesayon	meṣa "ram"	Aries
May	พฤษภาคม	พ.ค.	phruetsaphakhom	vṛṣabha "bull"	Taurus
June	มิถุนายน	มิ.ย.	mithunayon	mithuna "a pair"	Gemini
July	กรกฎาคม	ก.ค.	karakadakhom	karkaṭa "crab"	Cancer
August	สิงหาคม	ส.ค.	singhakhom	siṃha "lion"	Leo
September	กันยายน	ก.ย.	kanyayon	kanyā "girl"	Virgo
October	ตุลาคม	ต.ค.	tulakhom	tulā "balance"	Libra
November	พฤศจิกายน	พ.ย.	phruetsachikayon	vṛścika "scorpion"	Scorpio
December	ธันวาคม	ธ.ค.	thanwakhom	dhanu "bow, arc"	Sagittarius

=== Tongan calendar ===
The Tongan calendar is based on the cycles of the Moon around the Earth in one year. The months are:

1. Liha Mu'a
2. Liha Mui
3. Vai Mu'a
4. Vai Mui
5. Faka'afu Mo'ui
6. Faka'afu Mate
7. Hilinga Kelekele
8. Hilinga Mea'a
9. 'Ao'ao
10. Fu'ufu'unekinanga
11. 'Uluenga
12. Tanumanga
13. 'O'oamofanongo

=== Pingelapese ===
Pingelapese, a language from Micronesia, also uses a lunar calendar. There are 12 months associated with their calendar. The Moon first appears in March, they name this month Kahlek. This system has been used for hundreds of years and throughout many generations. This calendar is cyclical and relies on the position and shape of the Moon.

=== Kollam era (Malayalam) calendar ===
Malayalam name	Transliteration	Concurrent Gregorian months	Sanskrit word and meaning	Zodiac sign
ചിങ്ങം	chi-ngnga-m	August–September	simha "lion"	Leo
കന്നി	ka-nni	September–October	kanyā "girl"	Virgo
തുലാം	thu-lā-m	October–November	tulā "balance"	Libra
വൃശ്ചികം	vRSh-chi-ka-m	November–December	vṛścika "scorpion"	Scorpio
ധനു	dha-nu	December–January	dhanu "bow, arc"	Sagittarius
മകരം	ma-ka-ra-m	January–February	mokara "sea-monster"	Capricorn
കുംഭം	kum-bha-m	February–March	kumbha "pitcher, water-pot"	Aquarius
മീനം	mee-na-m	March–April	mīna "(a specific kind of) fish"	Pisces
മേടം	mE-Da-m	April–May	meṣa "ram"	Aries
ഇടവം	i-Ta-va-m	May – June	vṛṣabha "bull"	Taurus
മിഥുനം	mi-thu-na-m	June–July	mithuna "a pair"	Gemini
കർക്കടകം	kar-kka-Ta-ka-m	July–August	karkaṭa "crab"	Cancer

=== Sinhalese calendar ===
The Sinhalese calendar is the Buddhist calendar in Sri Lanka with Sinhala names. Each full moon Poya day marks the start of a Buddhist lunar month. The first month is Bak.

1. Duruthu (දුරුතු)
2. Navam (නවම්)
3. Mædin (මැදින්)
4. Bak (බක්)
5. Vesak (වෙසක්)
6. Poson (පොසොන්)
7. Æsala (ඇසල)
8. Nikini (නිකිණි)
9. Binara (බිනර)
10. Vap (වප්)
11. Il (iL) (ඉල්)
12. Unduvap (උඳුවප්)

=== Germanic calendar ===
The old Icelandic calendar is not in official use anymore, but some Icelandic holidays and annual feasts are still calculated from it. It has 12 months, broken down into two groups of six often termed "winter months" and "summer months". The calendar is peculiar in that the months always start on the same weekday rather than on the same date. Hence Þorri always starts on a Friday sometime between January 22 and January 28 (Old style: January 9 to January 15), Góa always starts on a Sunday between February 21 and February 27 (Old style: February 8 to February 14).

- Skammdegi ("Short days")
1. Gormánuður (mid-October – mid-November, "slaughter month" or "Gór's month")
2. Ýlir (mid-November – mid-December, "Yule month")
3. Mörsugur (mid-December – mid-January, "fat sucking month")
4. Þorri (mid-January – mid-February, "frozen snow month")
5. Góa (mid-February – mid-March, "Góa's month, see Nór")
6. Einmánuður (mid-March – mid-April, "lone" or "single month")
- Náttleysi ("Nightless days")
1. Harpa (mid-April – mid-May, Harpa is a female name, probably a forgotten goddess, first day of Harpa is celebrated as Sumardagurinn fyrsti – first day of summer)
2. Skerpla (mid-May – mid-June, another forgotten goddess)
3. Sólmánuður (mid-June – mid-July, "sun month")
4. Heyannir (mid-July – mid-August, "hay business month")
5. Tvímánuður (mid-August – mid-September, "two" or "second month")
6. Haustmánuður (mid-September – mid-October, "autumn month")

=== Old Georgian calendar ===
Month	Georgian month name	Transliteration	Georgian other names	Transliteration
January	აპნისი, აპანი	Apnisi, Apani		
February	სურწყუნისი	Surtskunisi	განცხადებისთვე	Gantskhadebistve
March	მირკანი	Mirkani		
April	იგრიკა	Igrika		
May	ვარდობისა	Vardobisa	ვარდობისთვე	Vardobistve
June	მარიალისა	Marialisa	თიბათვე, ივანობისთვე	Tibatve, Ivanobistve
July	თიბისა	Tibisa	მკათათვე, კვირიკობისთვე	Mkatatve, Kvirikobistve
August	ქველთობისა	Kveltobisa	მარიამობისთვე	Mariamobistve
September	ახალწლისა	Akhaltslisa	ენკენისთვე	Enkenistve
October	სთვლისა	Stvlisa	ღვინობისთვე	Gvinobistve
November	ტირისკონი	Tiriskoni	გიორგობისთვე, ჭინკობისთვე	Giorgobistve, Chinkobistve
December	ტირისდენი	Tirisdeni	ქრისტეშობისთვე	Kristeshobistve

*NOTE: New Year in ancient Georgia started from September.

=== Old Swedish calendar ===
1. Torsmånad (January, 'Torre's month' (ancient god))
2. Göjemånad (February, 'Goe's month' (ancient goddess))
3. Vårmånad (March, 'Spring month')
4. Gräsmånad (April, 'Grass month')
5. Blomstermånad (May, 'Bloom month')
6. Sommarmånad (June, 'Summer month')
7. Hömånad (July, 'Hay month')
8. Skördemånad, Rötmånad (August, 'Harvest month' or 'Rot month')
9. Höstmånad (September, 'Autumn month')
10. Slaktmånad (October, 'Slaughter month')
11. Vintermånad (November, 'Winter month')
12. Julmånad (December, 'Christmas month')

=== Old English calendar ===
Like the Old Norse calendar, the Anglo-Saxons had their own calendar before they were Christianized which reflected native traditions and deities. These months were attested by Bede in his works On Chronology and The Reckoning of Time written in the 8th century. His Old English month names are probably written as pronounced in Bede's native Northumbrian dialect. The months were named after the Moon; the new moon marking the end of an old month and start of a new month; the full moon occurring in the middle of the month, after which the whole month took its name.

Old English month names from Bede's The Reckoning of Time
Year order	Northumbrian Old English	Modern English transliteration	Roman equivalent
1	Æfterra-ġēola mōnaþ	"After-Yule month"	January
2	Sol-mōnaþ	"Sol month"	February
3	Hrēð-mōnaþ	"Hreth month"	March
4	Ēostur-mōnaþ	"Ēostur month"	April
5	Ðrimilce-mōnaþ	"Three-milkings month"	May
6	Ærra-Liþa	"Ere-Litha"	June
7	Æftera-Liþa	"After-Litha"	July
8	Weōd-mōnaþ	"Weed month"	August
9	Hāliġ-mōnaþ or Hærfest-mōnaþ	"Holy month" or "Harvest month"	September
10	Winter-fylleþ	"Winter-filleth"	October
11	Blōt-mōnaþ	"Blót month"	November
12	Ærra-ġēola mōnaþ	"Ere-Yule"	December

When an intercalary month was needed, a third Litha month was inserted in mid-summer.

=== Gaulish calendar ===
The Gaulish Coligny calendar is an Iron Age Metonic lunisolar calendar, with 12 lunar months of either 29 or 30 days. The lunar month is calculated to a precision of within 24 hours of the lunar phase, achieved by a particular arrangement of months, and the month of EQUOS having a variable length of 29 or 30 days to adjust for any lunar slippage. This setup means the calendar could stay precisely aligned to its lunar phase indefinitely.

The lunar month is divided into two halves, the first of 15 days and the second of 14 or 15 days. The month is calculated to start at the first quarter moon, with the full moon at the centre of the first half-month and the dark moon at the centre of the second half-month. The calendar does not rely on unreliable visual sightings.

An intercalary lunar month is inserted before every 30 lunar months to keep in sync with the solar year. Every 276 years this adds one day to the solar point, so if for example the calendar was 1,000 years old, it would only have slipped by less than 4 days against the solar year.

	Name	Days	Meaning	Modern months
I-1	Unknown	30		Intercalary One
1	Samonios	30	summer month	May-June
2	Dumannios	29		June-July
3	Rivros	30	fat month	July-August
4	Anagantios	29		August-September
5	Ogronios	30	cold month	September-October
6	Cutios	30	wind month	October-November
I-2	[.]antaran[...]	30		Intercalary Two
7	Giamonios	29	winter month	November-December
8	Simivisonnios	30		December-January
9	Equos	29 or 30		January-February
10	Elembivios	29		February-March
11	Edrinios	30	month of heat	March-April
12	Cantlos	29	month of song	April-May

=== Old Hungarian calendar ===
Nagyszombati kalendárium (in Latin: Calendarium Tyrnaviense) from 1579. Historically Hungary used a 12-month calendar that appears to have been zodiacal in nature but eventually came to correspond to the Gregorian months as shown below:

1. Boldogasszony hava (January, 'month of the happy/blessed lady')
2. Böjtelő hava (February, 'month of early fasting/Lent' or 'month before fasting/Lent')
3. Böjtmás hava (March, 'second month of fasting/Lent')
4. Szent György hava (April, 'Saint George's month')
5. Pünkösd hava (May, 'Pentecost month')
6. Szent Iván hava (June, 'Saint John [the Baptist]'s month')
7. Szent Jakab hava (July, 'Saint James' month')
8. Kisasszony hava (August, 'month of the Virgin')
9. Szent Mihály hava (September, 'Saint Michael's month')
10. Mindszent hava (October, 'all saints' month')
11. Szent András hava (November, 'Saint Andrew's month')
12. Karácsony hava (December, 'month of Yule/Christmas')

=== Czech calendar ===
1. Leden – derives from 'led' (ice)
2. Únor – derives from 'nořit' (to dive, referring to the ice sinking into the water due to melting)
3. Březen – derives from 'bříza' (birch)
4. Duben – derives from 'dub' (oak)
5. Květen – derives from 'květ' (flower)
6. Červen – derives from 'červ' (worm, that is scale insect which was picked to make dyes)
7. Červenec – is the second 'červen' (formerly known as 2nd červen)
8. Srpen – derives from 'srp' (sickle)
9. Září – derives from 'jelení říje', which refers to the estrous cycle of female elk
10. Říjen – derived from the same as Září
11. Listopad – falling leaves
12. Prosinec – derives from old Czech 'prosiněti', which means to shine through (refers to the sun light shining through the clouds)

=== Old Egyptian calendar ===
The ancient civil Egyptian calendar had a year that was 365 days long and was divided into 12 months of 30 days each, plus 5 extra days (epagomenes) at the end of the year. The months were divided into 3 "weeks" of ten days each. Because the ancient Egyptian year was almost a quarter of a day shorter than the solar year and stellar events "wandered" through the calendar, it is referred to as Annus Vagus or "Wandering Year".

1. Thout
2. Paopi
3. Hathor
4. Koiak
5. Tooba
6. Emshir
7. Paremhat
8. Paremoude
9. Pashons
10. Paoni
11. Epip
12. Mesori

=== Nisga'a calendar ===
The Nisga'a calendar coincides with the Gregorian calendar with each month referring to the type of harvesting that is done during the month.

1. K'aliiyee = Going North – referring to the Sun returning to its usual place in the sky
2. Buxwlaks = Needles Blowing About – February is usually a very windy month in the Nass River Valley
3. Xsaak = To Eat Oolichans – Oolichans are harvested during this month
4. Mmaal = Canoes – The river has defrosted, hence canoes are used once more
5. Yansa'alt = Leaves are Blooming – Warm weather has arrived and leaves on the trees begin to bloom
6. Miso'o = Sockeye – majority of Sockeye Salmon runs begin this month
7. Maa'y = Berries – berry picking season
8. Wii Hoon = Great Salmon – referring to the abundance of Salmon that are now running
9. Genuugwwikw = Trail of the Marmot – Marmots, Ermines and animals as such are hunted
10. Xlaaxw = To Eat Trout – trout are mostly eaten this time of year
11. Gwilatkw = To Blanket – The earth is "blanketed" with snow
12. Luut'aa = Sit In – the Sun "sits" in one spot for a period of time

=== French Republican calendar ===
This calendar was proposed during the French Revolution, and used by the French government for about twelve years from late 1793. There were twelve months of 30 days each, grouped into three ten-day weeks called décades. The five or six extra days needed to approximate the tropical year were placed after the months at the end of each year. A period of four years ending on a leap day was to be called a Franciade. It began at the autumn equinox:

- Autumn:
1. Vendémiaire
2. Brumaire
3. Frimaire
- Winter:
1. Nivôse
2. Pluviôse
3. Ventôse
- Spring:
1. Germinal
2. Floréal
3. Prairial
- Summer:
1. Messidor
2. Thermidor
3. Fructidor

=== Eastern Ojibwe calendar ===
Ojibwe month names (Note: Due to Eastern Ojibwe is a vowel syncope dialect, the elided vowels (and the occasionally elided consonants) have been added back in the table below, shown in brackets.) are based on the key feature of the month. Consequently, months between various regions have different names based on the key feature of each month in their particular region. In the Eastern Ojibwe, this can be seen in when the sucker makes its run, which allows the Ojibwe to fish for them. Additionally, Rhodes also informs of not only the variability in the month names, but how in Eastern Ojibwe these names were originally applied to the lunar months the Ojibwe originally used, which was a lunisolar calendar, fixed by the date of Akiinaaniwan (typically December 27) that marks when sunrise is the latest in the Northern Hemisphere.

Roman Month	Month in Eastern Ojibwe	English translation	Original order in the Ojibwa year	Starting at the first full moon after:
January in those places that have a sucker run during that time	n[a]mebin-giizis	sucker moon	1	Akiinaaniwan on 27 December
January in those places that have a sucker run during that time	n[a]meb[i]ni-giizis	sucker moon	1	Akiinaaniwan on 27 December
February	[o]naab[a]ni-giizis	Crust-on-the-snow moon	2	25 January
March	zii[n]z[i]baak[wa]doke-giizis	Sugaring moon	3	26 February
April in those places that have a sucker run during that time	n[a]mebin-giizis	sucker moon	4	25 March
April in those places that have a sucker run during that time	n[a]meb[i]ni-giizis	sucker moon	4	25 March
April in those places that do not have a sucker run during that time	waawaas[a]gone-giizis	Flower moon	4	25 March
May in those places that have an April sucker run	waawaas[a]gone-giizis	Flower moon	4	25 March
May in those places that have a January sucker run	g[i]tige-giizis	Planting moon	5	24 April
June in those places that have an April sucker run	g[i]tige-giizis	Planting moon	5	24 April
June in those places that have a January sucker run	[o]deh[i]min-giizis	Strawberry moon	6	23 May
July	miin-giizis	Blueberry moon	7	22 June
August	[o]dat[a]gaag[o]min-giizis	Blackberry moon	8	20 July
September	m[an]daamin-giizis	Corn moon	9	18 August
October	b[i]naakwe-giizis	Leaves-fall moon	10	17 September
October	b[i]naakwii-giizis	Harvest moon	10	17 September
November	g[a]shkadin-giizis	Freeze-up moon	11	16 October
December	g[i]chi-b[i]boon-giizis	Big-winter moon	12	15 November
January in those places that do not have a sucker run during that time	[o]shki-b[i]boon-gii[zi]soons	Little new-winter moon	13 (leap month)	only used if the new moon after g[i]chi-b[i]boon-giizis occurs before Akiinaaniwan on 27 December.

== See also ==
- Assyrian calendar
- Chinese calendar
- Egyptian calendar
- Ethiopian calendar
- French Republican calendar
- Kurdish calendar
- Lunar month
- Maya calendar
- Month of year

== Sources ==
- Kapoor, Ramesh (2021). "Fixing the chronology in Tai-Ahom chronicles by using astronomical references". Journal of Astronomical History and Heritage. 24 (3): 665–687. doi:10.3724/SP.J.1440-2807.2021.03.07.
- Phukan Baruah, B. N.N. (1964). Ahom lexicon. The government of Assam in the department of historical and antiquarian studies.
- Newton, Dr Sam (2000). "The Old English Calendar". Wuffings.
- Esslemont, J. E. (1980). Bahá'u'lláh and the New Era (5th ed.). Wilmette, Illinois, USA: Baháʼí Publishing Trust. ISBN 0-87743-160-4.
