= Tabarian calendar =

The Tabarian calendar is the indigenous solar calendar of the Mazandaranis and Gilaks.

== Months ==
Tabarian months	Equivalent in Solar hijri	Equivalent in Gregorian
1.Fardine Ma	2 Mordad - 31 Mordad	24 July - 22 August
2.Kerche Ma	1 Shahrivar - 30 Shahrivar	23 August - 21 September
3.Hare Ma	31 Shahrivar - 29 Mehr	22 September - 21 October
4.Tire Ma	30 Mehr - 29 Aban	22 October - 20 November
5.Melare Ma	30 Aban - 29 Azar	21 November - 20 December
6.Shervine Ma	30 Azar - 29 Dey	21 December - 19 January
7.Mire Ma	30 Dey - 29 Bahman	20 January - 18 February
8.Une Ma	30 Bahman - 29 Esfand	19 February - 20 March
Shishek Pitek	30 Esfand - 5 Farvardin	21 March - 25 March
9.Arke Ma	6 Farvardin - 4 Ordibehesht	26 March - 24 April
10.De Ma	5 Ordibehesht - 3 Khordad	25 April - 24 May
11.Vahmane Ma	4 Khordad - 2 Tir	25 May - 23 June
12.Nurze Ma	3 Tir - 1 Mordad	24 June - 23 July

== See also ==
=== Caspian people and culture ===
- Tabarian New Year
- Tabarian culture
- Tabarian people
- Mazanderani
- Gilaki

=== Similar systems ===
- Armenian calendar
