= Pawukon calendar =

210-day calendar from Bali, Indonesia

Today (at UTC+00)
- Thursday, 20 August 2026
- Balinese pawukon: Menga, Kajeng, Menala, Wage, Maulu, Wraspati of Medangkungan, Uma, Dadi, Suka
Other calendars
Armenian	1 Hoṙi 1476
Babylonian	6 Abu, 2337 SE
Bengali	5 Bhadro, BS 1433
Chinese	Yang Fire Tiger・Horn Mansion; 8 Qīyuè, Bǐngwǔnián (Liqiu, 3 days until Chushu)
Common Era	20 August 2026 CE
Coptic	14 Mesori, AM 1742
Egyptian	6 Tybi, NE 2775
Ethiopian	14 Naḥasē, 2018 Amätä Məhrät
French Republican	Décade I, Tridi de Fructidor de l'Année 234 de la République
Gregorian	20 August, AD 2026
Hebrew	7 Elul, AM 5786
Icelandic	Fimmtudagur of week 18 of summer of year 2026
Islamic	6 Rabi' al-awwal, AH 1448 (tabular method)
ISO week date	2026-W34-4
Japanese	8 Fumizuki, Reiwa 8 (Risshū, 3 days until Shosho)
Julian	7 August, AD 2026 (AM 7534)
Julian day	2461273
Maya	13.0.13.15.10; 3 Mol, 2 Oc
Roman	ante diem VII Idus Augustas, AUC 2779
Solar Hijri	29 Mordad, SH 1405

The Pawukon is a 210-day calendar that has its origins in the Hindu religion in Bali, Indonesia. The calendar consists of 10 different concurrent weeks of 1, 2, 3, 4, 5, 6, 7, 8, 9, and 10 days. On the first day of the year it is the first day of all the ten weeks. Because 210 is not divisible by 4, 8, or 9, extra days must be added to the 4, 8, and 9 day weeks.

== The days ==
- The days of the Dasawara (ten-day week) are Sri, Pati, Raja, Manuh, Duka, Manusa, Raksasa, Suka, Dewa, and Pandita.
- The days of the Sangawara (nine-day week) are Dangu, Jangur, Gigis, Nohan, Ogan, Erangan, Urungan, Tulus, Dadi.
- The days of the Astawara (eight-day week) are Sri, Indra, Guru, Yama, Ludra, Brahma, Kala, Uma.
- The days of the Saptawara (seven-day week) are Redite, Soma, Anggara, Buda, Wraspati, Sukra, Saniscara.
- The days of the Sadwara (six-day week) are Tungleh, Aryang, Urukung, Paniron, Was, Maulu.
- The days of the Pancawara (five-day week) are Paing, Pon, Wage, Keliwon, Umanis.
- The days of the Caturwara (four-day week) are Sri, Laba, Jaya, Menala.
- The days of the Triwara (three-day week) are Pasah, Beteng, and Kajeng.
- The days of the Dwiwara (two-day week) are Menga, Pepet.
- The day of the Ekawara (one-day week) is Luang.

== Order of the days ==
The days of the 3, 5, 6, and 7 day weeks are arranged in simple recurring cycles - much like the seven days of the week in the Gregorian calendar. Because 210 is not divisible by 4, 8, or 9, extra days must be added to the 4-, 8-, and 9-day weeks. For both the 4- and 8-day weeks, the penultimate day of the week is repeated twice in the week that would have otherwise ended on the 72nd day. For the 9-day week, the first day of the week is repeated 3 times in the first week of the 210-day Pawukon. The complexity of the calendar is increased by the calculations required to determine the arrangement of the days of the 1-, 2-, and 10-day weeks, which are not ordered in simple recurring 1, 2 and 10-day cycles.

== Calculation ==
Each of the days of the five, seven, and ten day weeks has a urip, or ritual value. For the ten-day week, the urip of the days are - from the first day to the tenth day - 5, 2, 8, 6, 4, 7, 10, 3, 9, 1. For the seven-day week, the urip of the days are - from first day to seventh day - 5, 4, 3, 7, 8, 6, and 9. For the five-day week, the urip of the days are - from the first day to the fifth day - 9, 7, 4, 8, 5.

For any particular day of the Pawukon, add the urip of the day of the 5-day week to the day of the seven-day week and then add one - if the sum is more than ten, then ten must be subtracted from it. This calculated value determines which day of the week it is in the 1-, 2-, and 10-day weeks. If the calculated value is even, then the day is Pepet in the two-day week and Luang in the one-day week. But, if the calculated value is odd then the day is Menga in the two-day week and is not a day of the one-day week. The day in the ten-day week is the one for which the calculated value matches its urip.

For example the first day of the year has a value of 9 in the five-day-week, 5 in the seven-day-week: 9+5+1-10=5, which is equivalent to the urip value of the first day of the ten-day-week, so the day is a Sri in the ten-day week. The sixth day of the year has 9 urip in the five-day-week and 6 in the seven-day-week: 9+6+1-10=6, which is equivalent to the urip value of the fourth day of the ten-day-week, so the day is Manuh.

== Calendar completion ==
Using the rules given above, the table of the days of Pawukon was constructed below. Since the days of the Pawukon, as given in the table below, do not change from one Pawukon to the next, a durable representation of the Pawukon can be used over and over again. With a few more details, the Pawukon is complete.

The saptawara (seven-day week) is special in that each of its thirty weeks is named. When certain days of the pancawara and saptawara coincide, it is a special day. These days of conjunction are Buda-Keliwon, Saniscara-Keliwon, Buda-Wage, Anggara-Keliwon, and Redite-Keliwon.

== Correspondence with the Gregorian Calendar ==
Pawukon cycles are unnumbered, so the calendar has no epoch, and the choice of date on which to base a correspondence is arbitrary. Dershowitz and Reingold chose the first Pawukon that began on a positive Julian Day Number, which was specifically JDN 146 (May 26, 4713 BCE in the proleptic Julian calendar; April 18 of that year in the proleptic Gregorian). The most recent Pawukon as of this writing began on Gregorian date July 5, 2020, making the date of this edit (Tuesday, January 5, 2021) the 185th day of the current cycle. Consulting the table below, we find that it is Menga, Beteng, Jaya, Umanis, Was, Anggara, Kala, Jangur, Dewa. The Saptawara maps to the Gregorian weekday cycle one-to-one, with Redite as Sunday, which provides a simple double-check mechanism: since we have Anggara on Tuesday, we have not made an obvious error in the counting.

Day #	Ekawara	Dwiwara	Triwara	Caturwara	Pancawara	Sadwara	Saptawara	Asatawara	Sangawara	Dasawara	Saptawara Week Name
1		Menga	Pasah	Sri	Paing	Tungleh	Redite	Sri	Dangu	Sri	Sinta
2	Luang	Pepet	Beteng	Laba	Pon	Aryang	Soma	Indra	Dangu	Pati	Sinta
3	Luang	Pepet	Kajeng	Jaya	Wage	Urukung	Anggara	Guru	Dangu	Raja	Sinta
4	Luang	Pepet	Pasah	Menala	Keliwon	Paniron	Buda	Yama	Dangu	Manuh	Sinta
5	Luang	Pepet	Beteng	Sri	Umanis	Was	Wraspati	Ludra	Jangur	Duka	Sinta
6	Luang	Pepet	Kajeng	Laba	Paing	Maulu	Sukra	Brahma	Gigis	Manuh	Sinta
7		Menga	Pasah	Jaya	Pon	Tungleh	Saniscara	Kala	Nohan	Manusa	Sinta
8	Luang	Pepet	Beteng	Menala	Wage	Aryang	Redite	Uma	Ogan	Raksasa	Landep
9		Menga	Kajeng	Sri	Keliwon	Urukung	Soma	Sri	Erangan	Suka	Landep
10		Menga	Pasah	Laba	Umanis	Paniron	Anggara	Indra	Urungan	Dewa	Landep
11		Menga	Beteng	Jaya	Paing	Was	Buda	Guru	Tulus	Manusa	Landep
12	Luang	Pepet	Kajeng	Menala	Pon	Maulu	Wraspati	Yama	Dadi	Manuh	Landep
13		Menga	Pasah	Sri	Wage	Tungleh	Sukra	Ludra	Dangu	Pandita	Landep
14	Luang	Pepet	Beteng	Laba	Keliwon	Aryang	Saniscara	Brahma	Jangur	Raja	Landep
15		Menga	Kajeng	Jaya	Umanis	Urukung	Redite	Kala	Gigis	Pandita	Ukir
16	Luang	Pepet	Pasah	Menala	Paing	Paniron	Soma	Uma	Nohan	Duka	Ukir
17		Menga	Beteng	Sri	Pon	Was	Anggara	Sri	Ogan	Pandita	Ukir
18	Luang	Pepet	Kajeng	Laba	Wage	Maulu	Buda	Indra	Erangan	Pati	Ukir
19		Menga	Pasah	Jaya	Keliwon	Tungleh	Wraspati	Guru	Urungan	Manusa	Ukir
20	Luang	Pepet	Beteng	Menala	Umanis	Aryang	Sukra	Yama	Tulus	Pati	Ukir
21		Menga	Kajeng	Sri	Paing	Urukung	Saniscara	Ludra	Dadi	Dewa	Ukir
22		Menga	Pasah	Laba	Pon	Paniron	Redite	Brahma	Dangu	Suka	Kulantir
23		Menga	Beteng	Jaya	Wage	Was	Soma	Kala	Jangur	Dewa	Kulantir
24	Luang	Pepet	Kajeng	Menala	Keliwon	Maulu	Anggara	Uma	Gigis	Pati	Kulantir
25		Menga	Pasah	Sri	Umanis	Tungleh	Buda	Sri	Nohan	Suka	Kulantir
26	Luang	Pepet	Beteng	Laba	Paing	Aryang	Wraspati	Indra	Ogan	Raja	Kulantir
27	Luang	Pepet	Kajeng	Jaya	Pon	Urukung	Sukra	Guru	Erangan	Duka	Kulantir
28	Luang	Pepet	Pasah	Menala	Wage	Paniron	Saniscara	Yama	Urungan	Duka	Kulantir
29	Luang	Pepet	Beteng	Sri	Keliwon	Was	Redite	Ludra	Tulus	Duka	Taulu
30	Luang	Pepet	Kajeng	Laba	Umanis	Maulu	Soma	Brahma	Dadi	Raksasa	Taulu
31		Menga	Pasah	Jaya	Paing	Tungleh	Anggara	Kala	Dangu	Suka	Taulu
32		Menga	Beteng	Menala	Pon	Aryang	Buda	Uma	Jangur	Sri	Taulu
33		Menga	Kajeng	Sri	Wage	Urukung	Wraspati	Sri	Gigis	Suka	Taulu
34		Menga	Pasah	Laba	Keliwon	Paniron	Sukra	Indra	Nohan	Sri	Taulu
35		Menga	Beteng	Jaya	Umanis	Was	Saniscara	Guru	Ogan	Sri	Taulu
36		Menga	Kajeng	Menala	Paing	Maulu	Redite	Yama	Erangan	Sri	Gumbreg
37	Luang	Pepet	Pasah	Sri	Pon	Tungleh	Soma	Ludra	Urungan	Pati	Gumbreg
38	Luang	Pepet	Beteng	Laba	Wage	Aryang	Anggara	Brahma	Tulus	Raja	Gumbreg
39	Luang	Pepet	Kajeng	Jaya	Keliwon	Urukung	Buda	Kala	Dadi	Manuh	Gumbreg
40	Luang	Pepet	Pasah	Menala	Umanis	Paniron	Wraspati	Uma	Dangu	Duka	Gumbreg
41	Luang	Pepet	Beteng	Sri	Paing	Was	Sukra	Sri	Jangur	Manuh	Gumbreg
42		Menga	Kajeng	Laba	Pon	Maulu	Saniscara	Indra	Gigis	Manusa	Gumbreg
43	Luang	Pepet	Pasah	Jaya	Wage	Tungleh	Redite	Guru	Nohan	Raksasa	Wariga
44		Menga	Beteng	Menala	Keliwon	Aryang	Soma	Yama	Ogan	Suka	Wariga
45		Menga	Kajeng	Sri	Umanis	Urukung	Anggara	Ludra	Erangan	Dewa	Wariga
46		Menga	Pasah	Laba	Paing	Paniron	Buda	Brahma	Urungan	Manusa	Wariga
47	Luang	Pepet	Beteng	Jaya	Pon	Was	Wraspati	Kala	Tulus	Manuh	Wariga
48		Menga	Kajeng	Menala	Wage	Maulu	Sukra	Uma	Dadi	Pandita	Wariga
49	Luang	Pepet	Pasah	Sri	Keliwon	Tungleh	Saniscara	Sri	Dangu	Raja	Wariga
50		Menga	Beteng	Laba	Umanis	Aryang	Redite	Indra	Jangur	Pandita	Warigadian
51	Luang	Pepet	Kajeng	Jaya	Paing	Urukung	Soma	Guru	Gigis	Duka	Warigadian
52		Menga	Pasah	Menala	Pon	Paniron	Anggara	Yama	Nohan	Pandita	Warigadian
53	Luang	Pepet	Beteng	Sri	Wage	Was	Buda	Ludra	Ogan	Pati	Warigadian
54		Menga	Kajeng	Laba	Keliwon	Maulu	Wraspati	Brahma	Erangan	Manusa	Warigadian
55	Luang	Pepet	Pasah	Jaya	Umanis	Tungleh	Sukra	Kala	Urungan	Pati	Warigadian
56		Menga	Beteng	Menala	Paing	Aryang	Saniscara	Uma	Tulus	Dewa	Warigadian
57		Menga	Kajeng	Sri	Pon	Urukung	Redite	Sri	Dadi	Suka	Julungwangi
58		Menga	Pasah	Laba	Wage	Paniron	Soma	Indra	Dangu	Dewa	Julungwangi
59	Luang	Pepet	Beteng	Jaya	Keliwon	Was	Anggara	Guru	Jangur	Pati	Julungwangi
60		Menga	Kajeng	Menala	Umanis	Maulu	Buda	Yama	Gigis	Suka	Julungwangi
61	Luang	Pepet	Pasah	Sri	Paing	Tungleh	Wraspati	Ludra	Nohan	Raja	Julungwangi
62	Luang	Pepet	Beteng	Laba	Pon	Aryang	Sukra	Brahma	Ogan	Duka	Julungwangi
63	Luang	Pepet	Kajeng	Jaya	Wage	Urukung	Saniscara	Kala	Erangan	Duka	Julungwangi
64	Luang	Pepet	Pasah	Menala	Keliwon	Paniron	Redite	Uma	Urungan	Duka	Sungsang
65	Luang	Pepet	Beteng	Sri	Umanis	Was	Soma	Sri	Tulus	Raksasa	Sungsang
66		Menga	Kajeng	Laba	Paing	Maulu	Anggara	Indra	Dadi	Suka	Sungsang
67		Menga	Pasah	Jaya	Pon	Tungleh	Buda	Guru	Dangu	Sri	Sungsang
68		Menga	Beteng	Menala	Wage	Aryang	Wraspati	Yama	Jangur	Suka	Sungsang
69		Menga	Kajeng	Sri	Keliwon	Urukung	Sukra	Ludra	Gigis	Sri	Sungsang
70		Menga	Pasah	Laba	Umanis	Paniron	Saniscara	Brahma	Nohan	Sri	Sungsang
71		Menga	Beteng	Jaya	Paing	Was	Redite	Kala	Ogan	Sri	Dunggulan
72	Luang	Pepet	Kajeng	Jaya	Pon	Maulu	Soma	Kala	Erangan	Pati	Dunggulan
73	Luang	Pepet	Pasah	Jaya	Wage	Tungleh	Anggara	Kala	Urungan	Raja	Dunggulan
74	Luang	Pepet	Beteng	Menala	Keliwon	Aryang	Buda	Uma	Tulus	Manuh	Dunggulan
75	Luang	Pepet	Kajeng	Sri	Umanis	Urukung	Wraspati	Sri	Dadi	Duka	Dunggulan
76	Luang	Pepet	Pasah	Laba	Paing	Paniron	Sukra	Indra	Dangu	Manuh	Dunggulan
77		Menga	Beteng	Jaya	Pon	Was	Saniscara	Guru	Jangur	Manusa	Dunggulan
78	Luang	Pepet	Kajeng	Menala	Wage	Maulu	Redite	Yama	Gigis	Raksasa	Kuningan
79		Menga	Pasah	Sri	Keliwon	Tungleh	Soma	Ludra	Nohan	Suka	Kuningan
80		Menga	Beteng	Laba	Umanis	Aryang	Anggara	Brahma	Ogan	Dewa	Kuningan
81		Menga	Kajeng	Jaya	Paing	Urukung	Buda	Kala	Erangan	Manusa	Kuningan
82	Luang	Pepet	Pasah	Menala	Pon	Paniron	Wraspati	Uma	Urungan	Manuh	Kuningan
83		Menga	Beteng	Sri	Wage	Was	Sukra	Sri	Tulus	Pandita	Kuningan
84	Luang	Pepet	Kajeng	Laba	Keliwon	Maulu	Saniscara	Indra	Dadi	Raja	Kuningan
85		Menga	Pasah	Jaya	Umanis	Tungleh	Redite	Guru	Dangu	Pandita	Langkir
86	Luang	Pepet	Beteng	Menala	Paing	Aryang	Soma	Yama	Jangur	Duka	Langkir
87		Menga	Kajeng	Sri	Pon	Urukung	Anggara	Ludra	Gigis	Pandita	Langkir
88	Luang	Pepet	Pasah	Laba	Wage	Paniron	Buda	Brahma	Nohan	Pati	Langkir
89		Menga	Beteng	Jaya	Keliwon	Was	Wraspati	Kala	Ogan	Manusa	Langkir
90	Luang	Pepet	Kajeng	Menala	Umanis	Maulu	Sukra	Uma	Erangan	Pati	Langkir
91		Menga	Pasah	Sri	Paing	Tungleh	Saniscara	Sri	Urungan	Dewa	Langkir
92		Menga	Beteng	Laba	Pon	Aryang	Redite	Indra	Tulus	Suka	Medangsia
93		Menga	Kajeng	Jaya	Wage	Urukung	Soma	Guru	Dadi	Dewa	Medangsia
94	Luang	Pepet	Pasah	Menala	Keliwon	Paniron	Anggara	Yama	Dangu	Pati	Medangsia
95		Menga	Beteng	Sri	Umanis	Was	Buda	Ludra	Jangur	Suka	Medangsia
96	Luang	Pepet	Kajeng	Laba	Paing	Maulu	Wraspati	Brahma	Gigis	Raja	Medangsia
97	Luang	Pepet	Pasah	Jaya	Pon	Tungleh	Sukra	Kala	Nohan	Duka	Medangsia
98	Luang	Pepet	Beteng	Menala	Wage	Aryang	Saniscara	Uma	Ogan	Duka	Medangsia
99	Luang	Pepet	Kajeng	Sri	Keliwon	Urukung	Redite	Sri	Erangan	Duka	Pujut
100	Luang	Pepet	Pasah	Laba	Umanis	Paniron	Soma	Indra	Urungan	Raksasa	Pujut
101		Menga	Beteng	Jaya	Paing	Was	Anggara	Guru	Tulus	Suka	Pujut
102		Menga	Kajeng	Menala	Pon	Maulu	Buda	Yama	Dadi	Sri	Pujut
103		Menga	Pasah	Sri	Wage	Tungleh	Wraspati	Ludra	Dangu	Suka	Pujut
104		Menga	Beteng	Laba	Keliwon	Aryang	Sukra	Brahma	Jangur	Sri	Pujut
105		Menga	Kajeng	Jaya	Umanis	Urukung	Saniscara	Kala	Gigis	Sri	Pujut
106		Menga	Pasah	Menala	Paing	Paniron	Redite	Uma	Nohan	Sri	Pahang
107	Luang	Pepet	Beteng	Sri	Pon	Was	Soma	Sri	Ogan	Pati	Pahang
108	Luang	Pepet	Kajeng	Laba	Wage	Maulu	Anggara	Indra	Erangan	Raja	Pahang
109	Luang	Pepet	Pasah	Jaya	Keliwon	Tungleh	Buda	Guru	Urungan	Manuh	Pahang
110	Luang	Pepet	Beteng	Menala	Umanis	Aryang	Wraspati	Yama	Tulus	Duka	Pahang
111	Luang	Pepet	Kajeng	Sri	Paing	Urukung	Sukra	Ludra	Dadi	Manuh	Pahang
112		Menga	Pasah	Laba	Pon	Paniron	Saniscara	Brahma	Dangu	Manusa	Pahang
113	Luang	Pepet	Beteng	Jaya	Wage	Was	Redite	Kala	Jangur	Raksasa	Krulut
114		Menga	Kajeng	Menala	Keliwon	Maulu	Soma	Uma	Gigis	Suka	Krulut
115		Menga	Pasah	Sri	Umanis	Tungleh	Anggara	Sri	Nohan	Dewa	Krulut
116		Menga	Beteng	Laba	Paing	Aryang	Buda	Indra	Ogan	Manusa	Krulut
117	Luang	Pepet	Kajeng	Jaya	Pon	Urukung	Wraspati	Guru	Erangan	Manuh	Krulut
118		Menga	Pasah	Menala	Wage	Paniron	Sukra	Yama	Urungan	Pandita	Krulut
119	Luang	Pepet	Beteng	Sri	Keliwon	Was	Saniscara	Ludra	Tulus	Raja	Krulut
120		Menga	Kajeng	Laba	Umanis	Maulu	Redite	Brahma	Dadi	Pandita	Merakih
121	Luang	Pepet	Pasah	Jaya	Paing	Tungleh	Soma	Kala	Dangu	Duka	Merakih
122		Menga	Beteng	Menala	Pon	Aryang	Anggara	Uma	Jangur	Pandita	Merakih
123	Luang	Pepet	Kajeng	Sri	Wage	Urukung	Buda	Sri	Gigis	Pati	Merakih
124		Menga	Pasah	Laba	Keliwon	Paniron	Wraspati	Indra	Nohan	Manusa	Merakih
125	Luang	Pepet	Beteng	Jaya	Umanis	Was	Sukra	Guru	Ogan	Pati	Merakih
126		Menga	Kajeng	Menala	Paing	Maulu	Saniscara	Yama	Erangan	Dewa	Merakih
127		Menga	Pasah	Sri	Pon	Tungleh	Redite	Ludra	Urungan	Suka	Tambir
128		Menga	Beteng	Laba	Wage	Aryang	Soma	Brahma	Tulus	Dewa	Tambir
129	Luang	Pepet	Kajeng	Jaya	Keliwon	Urukung	Anggara	Kala	Dadi	Pati	Tambir
130		Menga	Pasah	Menala	Umanis	Paniron	Buda	Uma	Dangu	Suka	Tambir
131	Luang	Pepet	Beteng	Sri	Paing	Was	Wraspati	Sri	Jangur	Raja	Tambir
132	Luang	Pepet	Kajeng	Laba	Pon	Maulu	Sukra	Indra	Gigis	Duka	Tambir
133	Luang	Pepet	Pasah	Jaya	Wage	Tungleh	Saniscara	Guru	Nohan	Duka	Tambir
134	Luang	Pepet	Beteng	Menala	Keliwon	Aryang	Redite	Yama	Ogan	Duka	Medangkungan
135	Luang	Pepet	Kajeng	Sri	Umanis	Urukung	Soma	Ludra	Erangan	Raksasa	Medangkungan
136		Menga	Pasah	Laba	Paing	Paniron	Anggara	Brahma	Urungan	Suka	Medangkungan
137		Menga	Beteng	Jaya	Pon	Was	Buda	Kala	Tulus	Sri	Medangkungan
138		Menga	Kajeng	Menala	Wage	Maulu	Wraspati	Uma	Dadi	Suka	Medangkungan
139		Menga	Pasah	Sri	Keliwon	Tungleh	Sukra	Sri	Dangu	Sri	Medangkungan
140		Menga	Beteng	Laba	Umanis	Aryang	Saniscara	Indra	Jangur	Sri	Medangkungan
141		Menga	Kajeng	Jaya	Paing	Urukung	Redite	Guru	Gigis	Sri	Matal
142	Luang	Pepet	Pasah	Menala	Pon	Paniron	Soma	Yama	Nohan	Pati	Matal
143	Luang	Pepet	Beteng	Sri	Wage	Was	Anggara	Ludra	Ogan	Raja	Matal
144	Luang	Pepet	Kajeng	Laba	Keliwon	Maulu	Buda	Brahma	Erangan	Manuh	Matal
145	Luang	Pepet	Pasah	Jaya	Umanis	Tungleh	Wraspati	Kala	Urungan	Duka	Matal
146	Luang	Pepet	Beteng	Menala	Paing	Aryang	Sukra	Uma	Tulus	Manuh	Matal
147		Menga	Kajeng	Sri	Pon	Urukung	Saniscara	Sri	Dadi	Manusa	Matal
148	Luang	Pepet	Pasah	Laba	Wage	Paniron	Redite	Indra	Dangu	Raksasa	Uye
149		Menga	Beteng	Jaya	Keliwon	Was	Soma	Guru	Jangur	Suka	Uye
150		Menga	Kajeng	Menala	Umanis	Maulu	Anggara	Yama	Gigis	Dewa	Uye
151		Menga	Pasah	Sri	Paing	Tungleh	Buda	Ludra	Nohan	Manusa	Uye
152	Luang	Pepet	Beteng	Laba	Pon	Aryang	Wraspati	Brahma	Ogan	Manuh	Uye
153		Menga	Kajeng	Jaya	Wage	Urukung	Sukra	Kala	Erangan	Pandita	Uye
154	Luang	Pepet	Pasah	Menala	Keliwon	Paniron	Saniscara	Uma	Urungan	Raja	Uye
155		Menga	Beteng	Sri	Umanis	Was	Redite	Sri	Tulus	Pandita	Menail
156	Luang	Pepet	Kajeng	Laba	Paing	Maulu	Soma	Indra	Dadi	Duka	Menail
157		Menga	Pasah	Jaya	Pon	Tungleh	Anggara	Guru	Dangu	Pandita	Menail
158	Luang	Pepet	Beteng	Menala	Wage	Aryang	Buda	Yama	Jangur	Pati	Menail
159		Menga	Kajeng	Sri	Keliwon	Urukung	Wraspati	Ludra	Gigis	Manusa	Menail
160	Luang	Pepet	Pasah	Laba	Umanis	Paniron	Sukra	Brahma	Nohan	Pati	Menail
161		Menga	Beteng	Jaya	Paing	Was	Saniscara	Kala	Ogan	Dewa	Menail
162		Menga	Kajeng	Menala	Pon	Maulu	Redite	Uma	Erangan	Suka	Parangbakat
163		Menga	Pasah	Sri	Wage	Tungleh	Soma	Sri	Urungan	Dewa	Parangbakat
164	Luang	Pepet	Beteng	Laba	Keliwon	Aryang	Anggara	Indra	Tulus	Pati	Parangbakat
165		Menga	Kajeng	Jaya	Umanis	Urukung	Buda	Guru	Dadi	Suka	Parangbakat
166	Luang	Pepet	Pasah	Menala	Paing	Paniron	Wraspati	Yama	Dangu	Raja	Parangbakat
167	Luang	Pepet	Beteng	Sri	Pon	Was	Sukra	Ludra	Jangur	Duka	Parangbakat
168	Luang	Pepet	Kajeng	Laba	Wage	Maulu	Saniscara	Brahma	Gigis	Duka	Parangbakat
169	Luang	Pepet	Pasah	Jaya	Keliwon	Tungleh	Redite	Kala	Nohan	Duka	Bala
170	Luang	Pepet	Beteng	Menala	Umanis	Aryang	Soma	Uma	Ogan	Raksasa	Bala
171		Menga	Kajeng	Sri	Paing	Urukung	Anggara	Sri	Erangan	Suka	Bala
172		Menga	Pasah	Laba	Pon	Paniron	Buda	Indra	Urungan	Sri	Bala
173		Menga	Beteng	Jaya	Wage	Was	Wraspati	Guru	Tulus	Suka	Bala
174		Menga	Kajeng	Menala	Keliwon	Maulu	Sukra	Yama	Dadi	Sri	Bala
175		Menga	Pasah	Sri	Umanis	Tungleh	Saniscara	Ludra	Dangu	Sri	Bala
176		Menga	Beteng	Laba	Paing	Aryang	Redite	Brahma	Jangur	Sri	Ugu
177	Luang	Pepet	Kajeng	Jaya	Pon	Urukung	Soma	Kala	Gigis	Pati	Ugu
178	Luang	Pepet	Pasah	Menala	Wage	Paniron	Anggara	Uma	Nohan	Raja	Ugu
179	Luang	Pepet	Beteng	Sri	Keliwon	Was	Buda	Sri	Ogan	Manuh	Ugu
180	Luang	Pepet	Kajeng	Laba	Umanis	Maulu	Wraspati	Indra	Erangan	Duka	Ugu
181	Luang	Pepet	Pasah	Jaya	Paing	Tungleh	Sukra	Guru	Urungan	Manuh	Ugu
182		Menga	Beteng	Menala	Pon	Aryang	Saniscara	Yama	Tulus	Manusa	Ugu
183	Luang	Pepet	Kajeng	Sri	Wage	Urukung	Redite	Ludra	Dadi	Raksasa	Wayang
184		Menga	Pasah	Laba	Keliwon	Paniron	Soma	Brahma	Dangu	Suka	Wayang
185		Menga	Beteng	Jaya	Umanis	Was	Anggara	Kala	Jangur	Dewa	Wayang
186		Menga	Kajeng	Menala	Paing	Maulu	Buda	Uma	Gigis	Manusa	Wayang
187	Luang	Pepet	Pasah	Sri	Pon	Tungleh	Wraspati	Sri	Nohan	Manuh	Wayang
188		Menga	Beteng	Laba	Wage	Aryang	Sukra	Indra	Ogan	Pandita	Wayang
189	Luang	Pepet	Kajeng	Jaya	Keliwon	Urukung	Saniscara	Guru	Erangan	Raja	Wayang
190		Menga	Pasah	Menala	Umanis	Paniron	Redite	Yama	Urungan	Pandita	Kelawu
191	Luang	Pepet	Beteng	Sri	Paing	Was	Soma	Ludra	Tulus	Duka	Kelawu
192		Menga	Kajeng	Laba	Pon	Maulu	Anggara	Brahma	Dadi	Pandita	Kelawu
193	Luang	Pepet	Pasah	Jaya	Wage	Tungleh	Buda	Kala	Dangu	Pati	Kelawu
194		Menga	Beteng	Menala	Keliwon	Aryang	Wraspati	Uma	Jangur	Manusa	Kelawu
195	Luang	Pepet	Kajeng	Sri	Umanis	Urukung	Sukra	Sri	Gigis	Pati	Kelawu
196		Menga	Pasah	Laba	Paing	Paniron	Saniscara	Indra	Nohan	Dewa	Kelawu
197		Menga	Beteng	Jaya	Pon	Was	Redite	Guru	Ogan	Suka	Dukut
198		Menga	Kajeng	Menala	Wage	Maulu	Soma	Yama	Erangan	Dewa	Dukut
199	Luang	Pepet	Pasah	Sri	Keliwon	Tungleh	Anggara	Ludra	Urungan	Pati	Dukut
200		Menga	Beteng	Laba	Umanis	Aryang	Buda	Brahma	Tulus	Suka	Dukut
201	Luang	Pepet	Kajeng	Jaya	Paing	Urukung	Wraspati	Kala	Dadi	Raja	Dukut
202	Luang	Pepet	Pasah	Menala	Pon	Paniron	Sukra	Uma	Dangu	Duka	Dukut
203	Luang	Pepet	Beteng	Sri	Wage	Was	Saniscara	Sri	Jangur	Duka	Dukut
204	Luang	Pepet	Kajeng	Laba	Keliwon	Maulu	Redite	Indra	Gigis	Duka	Watugunung
205	Luang	Pepet	Pasah	Jaya	Umanis	Tungleh	Soma	Guru	Nohan	Raksasa	Watugunung
206		Menga	Beteng	Menala	Paing	Aryang	Anggara	Yama	Ogan	Suka	Watugunung
207		Menga	Kajeng	Sri	Pon	Urukung	Buda	Ludra	Erangan	Sri	Watugunung
208		Menga	Pasah	Laba	Wage	Paniron	Wraspati	Brahma	Urungan	Suka	Watugunung
209		Menga	Beteng	Jaya	Keliwon	Was	Sukra	Kala	Tulus	Sri	Watugunung
210		Menga	Kajeng	Menala	Umanis	Maulu	Saniscara	Uma	Dadi	Sri	Watugunung

== See also ==
- Balinese saka calendar
- Javanese calendar
- Balinese Hinduism
