= Farvardin =

First month of the Solar Hijri calendar

- Native name: فروردین (Persian); حمل (Dari); Xakelêwe (Kurdish); فَردین (Mazanderani); Фарвардин / Ҳамал (Tajik)
- Calendar: Solar Hijri calendar
- Month number: 1
- Number of days: 31
- Season: Spring
- Gregorian equivalent: March-April

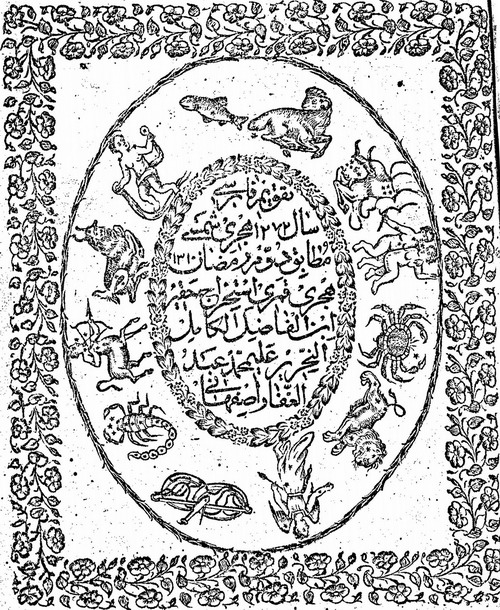
Cover of Najm al-Dawlah Isfahani's Persian Almanac showing the Solar Hijri calendar

Farvardin (Persian: فروردین, Persian pronunciation: [fæɾvæɾˈdiːn]), dedicated to the Faravahar, is the Iranian name for the first month of the Solar Hijri calendar, the official calendar of Iran, and corresponds with Aries on the Zodiac. Farvardin has 31 days. It is the first month of the spring season (Bahâr), and is followed by Ordibehesht. The Afghan Pashto name for it is Wray.

In three out of every four years, Farvardin begins on March 21 and ends on April 20 of the Gregorian calendar. In most Gregorian leap years, it begins 20 March following the leap day of 29 February. Otherwise, very rarely, Farvardin begins on March 19 or 22, and ends on April 18 or 21.

Its associated astrological sign in the tropical zodiac is Aries.

== Events ==
- 25 - 1244 - Assassination of Abraham Lincoln
- 18 - 1275 - The first Summer Olympic Games of the modern era begins in Athens, Greece, coinciding with the 75th anniversary of the Greek War of Independence.
- 24 - 1291 - The British passenger liner RMS Titanic hits an iceberg in the North Atlantic at 23:40 (sinks morning of Farvardin 25th).
- 25 - 1326 - Jackie Robinson becomes the first ever African American player in Major League Baseball, breaking a long time color barrier in the history of professional baseball in North America.
- 6 - 1350 - Proclamation of Bangladeshi Independence: A telegram by Sheikh Mujibur Rahman makes public the formal separation of Bangladesh from Pakistan, the text is read on radio that day.
- 30 - 1374 - Oklahoma City bombing
- 18 - 1375 - The 1996 season of Major League Soccer officially commences.
- 31 - 1378 - Columbine High School shooting
- 26 - 1392 - Two bombs explode near the finish line at the Boston Marathon in Boston, Massachusetts, killing three people and injuring 264 others
- 11 - 1401 - Siege of Chernihiv and Battle of Bucha both end in Ukrainian victories

== Observances ==
- Nowruz
- Easter Triduum - the three days before the first Sunday on or after the first full moon of Farvardin (Christian observance)
  - Maundy Thursday - Thursday on or after the full moon of Farvardin (Christian observance)
  - Good Friday - Friday on or after the full moon of Farvardin (Christian observance)
  - Holy Saturday - Saturday on or full moon of Farvardin (Christian observance)
- Easter - the first Sunday on or after the first full moon of Farvardin (Christian observance)
- Baháʼí Naw-Rúz - 1 Farvardin (Baháʼí holiday)
- Opening Day - Thursday or Friday of the first or second week of Farvardin (movable, date set by Major League Baseball, falls on the Nowruz period)
- Pakistan Day -2-3 Farvardin
- Feast of the Annunciation, Independence Day (Bangladesh) and Greek Independence Day - 5-6 Farvardin
- Khordad Sal - 6 Farvardin
- April Fools' Day - 12 or 13 Farvardin
- Islamic Republic Day - 12 Farvardin
- Sizdah Be-dar - 13 Farvardin
- Qingming Festival - 15-17 Farvardin
- International Day of Sport for Development and Peace - 17 or 18 Farvardin
- Farvardinegan - 19 Farvardin
- Jackie Robinson Day and One Boston Day - 26 or 27 Farvardin

== Births ==
- 27 - 1268 - Charlie Chaplin
- 31 - 1268 - Adolf Hitler
- 21 - 1321 - Hayedeh

== Deaths ==
- 25 - 1244 - Abraham Lincoln, 16th President of the United States
- 23 - 1324 - Franklin D. Roosevelt, 32nd President of the United States
- 8 - 1348 - Dwight D. Eisenhower, 34th President of the United States
- 20 - 1400 - Prince Philip, Duke of Edinburgh
