= Hindu chronology =

Hindu chronology may refer to:

- Indian astronomy
- Hindu calendar
- Hindu units of time
- Yuga, in philosophy, the name of an "epoch" or "era" within a cycle of four ages
- Vedic-Puranic chronology, an overview of Hindu mythology based on the Puranas
  - Archaeoastronomy and Vedic chronology
- Timeline of Hindu texts

== See also ==
- Indian calendar (disambiguation)
