= Tabarian culture =

Mazanderani culture includes existing social characteristics and norms as well as beliefs, arts, laws, customs, and traditions that are common among the Mazanderani people.

== See also ==
- Tabaristan
- Mazandarani language
- Tabarian calendar
