= Ġēolamonaþ =

Anglo-Saxon month

Ġēolamōnaþ or Ȝēolamōnaþ (modern English: Yule month) was the Anglo-Saxon name for the months of both December and January. The Anglo-Saxon scholar Bede explains in his treatise De temporum ratione (The Reckoning of Time) that the entire winter solstice period was known as Ġēola. Later on, December became known as Ǣrra-ġēolamōnaþ and January became known as Æfterra-ġēolamōnaþ, as this later Old English passage points out:

Se mōnaþ is nemned on Leden Decembris, and on ūre geþeōde se ǣrra geōla, forðan ða mōnþas twegen syndon nemde ānum naman, ōðer se ǣrra geōla, óðer se æftera.

Which translates:

The month is called in Latin December, and in our language geōla for two months enjoy the same name; the first one Se Ǣrra Geola [The Preceding Yule] and the other Se Æftera [The Following].

== See also ==
- Germanic calendar
- Anglo-Saxon
- Old English
