= Hāliġmōnaþ =

Anglo-Saxon name for the month of September

Hāliġmōnaþ or Hāliȝmōnaþ (Old English: [ˈhɑːlijmoːnɑθ]; modern English: 'holy month') was the Anglo-Saxon name for the month of September.

The name was recorded by the Anglo-Saxon scholar Bede in his treatise De temporum ratione (The Reckoning of Time), saying only "Halegh-monath is a month of sacredness."

An entry in the Menologium seu Calendarium Poeticum, an Anglo-Saxon poem about the months, explains that "in the ninth month in the year there are thirty days. The month is called in Latin September, and in our language holy month, because it is assumed that Christianity was first preached in that month."

== See also ==
- Germanic calendar
- Anglo-Saxon
- Old English
