= Ǣrra-Līða =

Anglo-Saxon name for the month of June

Ǣrra Līða (Old English pronunciation: [ˈæːrˠːɑ ˈliːðɑ]; "first 'liða'") was the Anglo-Saxon name for the month of June.

== Līða ==
There are many theories as to what “liða” refers to. Neopagans use the word to refer to Midsummer; however, the Anglo-Saxon scholar Bede mentions in his treatise De temporum ratione that “liða means 'calm', or 'navigable' in both the month and the serenity of the breezes, and the waters are usually navigable.” The fact that the Old English word for “to sail” is līðan seems to support Bede's statement.

Bede also mentioned the sailing aspect of liða in a second text, writing:

“[…] se mōnaþ is nemned on lǣden Iunius, and on ūre geþeōde se Ǣrra Līða, for ðon seō lyft biþ ðonne smylte and ða windas. Ond monnum biþ ðonne gewunelīc ðæt hī līðaþ ðonne on sǣs bryme.”

[…] the month is called Iunius in Latin and in our language, Ǣrra Liða, for the sky is quiet and so too the winds. And it is usual to sail upon the sea.

== Æftera Līða ==
The next month in the Anglo-Saxon calendar was Æftera Līða', (modern English: second 'liða), which corresponds to the modern July.

== See also ==
- Germanic calendar
- Anglo-Saxon
- Old English
- The Shire#Calendar
