= Solmōnaþ =

Month in the Anglo-Saxon calendar

In the Anglo-Saxon calendar, Solmōnaþ (modern English: month of the hearthcakes) was the month roughly corresponding to February.

The name was recorded by the Anglo-Saxon scholar Bede in his treatise De temporum ratione (The Reckoning of Time), saying that "Sol-Monath can be said to be the month of cakes, which were offered to their gods"; It was formerly argued that there is no other reference to sol meaning ‘cake’ in Old English, and that as sol is used to mean ‘mud’ or ‘dirt’ in most texts, a far more likely meaning is that the sol month was the muddy month, especially given the English climate at that time of year. However, it has since been discovered that sol is equivalent to 'hearthcake' in several texts, and thus Bede is likely to have been correct in his definition.

== See also ==
- Germanic calendar
- Anglo-Saxon
- Old English
- Shrovetide
