= Wēodmōnaþ =

Anglo-Saxon term for August

Wēodmōnaþ or Ƿēodmōnaþ (modern English: Weed (or Grass) Month) was the Anglo-Saxon name for the month of August.

The name was recorded by the Anglo-Saxon scholar Bede in his treatise De temporum ratione (The Reckoning of Time), saying that "Vueod-Monath is the month of weeds, as this is the time when they grow most abundantly"

Ƿēodmōnaþ is also explained in Menologium of the Anglo-Saxon Chronicles:

"Agustus mōnaþ on ūre geþēode wē nemnaþ Wēodmōnaþ, for ðon ðe hī on ðam mōnþe mǣst geweaxaþ."

"The month of Agustus we call the weed month in our language, for these grow most in this month.”

== See also ==
- Germanic calendar
- Anglo-Saxon
- Old English
