= Hreðmōnaþ =

Anglo-Saxon name for the month of March

Hrēðmōnaþ (modern English: Rheda’s month) was the Anglo-Saxon name for the month of March.

The first definition of the name explains that:

“On ðæm þriddan mōnþe on geāre biþ ān and þrittig daga and se mōnþ is nemned on lǣden martius and on ūre geþeōde hrēdmōnaþ.”

“In the third month in the year are one-and-thirty days, and the month is called in Latin martius, and in our language, hrédmónaþ.”

The Anglo-Saxon scholar Bede explains the name in his treatise De temporum ratione (The Reckoning of Time), saying "Rhed-monath is named for the goddess, to whom they sacrificed in this month.”

== See also ==
- Germanic calendar
- Anglo-Saxon
- Old English
