= Salwāǧa =

Eleventh month of the Solar Hijri calendar

Salwāǧá (Pashto: سلواغه) is the name of the eleventh month of the Afghan calendar. It occurs in the winter season, from January 20/21 to February 18/19. It has 30 days.

Salwāǧá corresponds with the tropical Zodiac sign Aquarius. Salwāǧá literally means "pail of water" in Pashto.

== Observances ==
- Chinese New Year - Movable (either on the first to third week of Salwāǧá)
- Super Bowl Sunday - Third or Fourth Sunday of Salwāǧá
- Washington's Birthday and President's Day - Last Monday of Salwāǧá
- Republic Day (India) and Australia Day - 6-7 Salwāǧá
- National Day of Sri Lanka - 16 Salwāǧá
- Valentine's Day - 25-26 Salwāǧá
