= Mordad =

- Native name: مُرداد (Persian); اسد (Dari); Gelawêj (Kurdish); Мурдод / Асад (Tajik)
- Calendar: Solar Hijri calendar
- Month number: 5
- Number of days: 31
- Season: Summer
- Gregorian equivalent: July-August

Mordad (Persian: مرداد, romanized: Mordād, Persian pronunciation: [moɾˈdɒːd]) is the fifth month of the Solar Hijri calendar, the official calendar of Iran and Afghanistan. Mordad has thirty-one days, spanning from 23 July to 22 August of the Gregorian calendar. It is the second month of summer after Tir, and is followed by Shahrivar. The Afghan Persian name is Asad; in Pashto it is Zmaray. The name is derived from Ameretat, the Zoroastrian divinity/divine concept of immortality.

== Events ==
- 13 - 1170 - The United States Revenue Cutter Service, predecessor of current United States Coast Guard, is founded as the US Revenue Marine by then Secretary of the Treasury Alexander Hamilton.
- 24 - 1324 - the Hirohito surrender broadcast, pre-recorded days before, is aired on NHK radio, formally declaring the end of all combat actions of the army and navy of the Empire of Japan and the acceptance of the terms of unconditional surrender of the country, people and armed forces to the Allies in accordance with the provisions of the Potsdam Declaration.
- 26 - 1324 - Proclamation of Indonesian Independence
- 23 - 1326 - Partition of India - Independence of India and Pakistan from Great Britain is achieved.
- 28 - 1332 - Iranian Prime Minister Mohammad Mosaddegh is overthrown in a coup d'état with the backing of the United States Central Intelligence Agency, beginning the nearly 25-year reign of the pro-US Mohammad Reza Shah Pahlavi. In the West, the August 19th 1953 coup is commonly known as by its CIA cryptonym, Operation Ajax, whereas in Iran it is commonly referred to as the 28th Mordad Coup.
- 18 - 1344 - Proclamation of Singapore: Then prime minister Lee Kwan Yew, tearful on national television, informs the Singaporean people of independence from Malaysia.
- 16 - 1403 - August 2024 Kursk Oblast incursion begins

== Deaths ==
- 19 - 1390 - Babak Masoumi, Iranian futsal player and coach.
- 10 - 1302 - Warren G. Harding, 29th President of the United States.

== Observances ==
- Birthday of Simón Bolívar and Colombian and Venezuelan Navy Day - 2 Mordad
- Amordadegan festival - 7 Mordad (Zoroastrian holiday)
- Paratroopers' Day - 11 Mordad
- United States Coast Guard Day - 13 Mordad
- National Day (Singapore) - 18 Mordad
- Independence Day (Pakistan) - 23 Mordad
- Assumption and Dormition of the Blessed Virgin Mary and Independence Day (India) - 23 or 24 Mordad
- Independence Day (Indonesia) - 26 Mordad
- National Aviation Day (United States) - 28 Mordad
