= Indian calendar =

Indian calendar may refer to any of the calendars, used for civil and religious purposes in India and other parts of Southeast Asia:

- The Indian national calendar (a variant of the Shalivahana calendar), the calendar officially used by the Government of India.
- Hindu calendars
- Vikram calendar
- Jain calendar
- Tamil calendar
- Bengali calendar
- Malayalam calendar
- Assamese calendar
- Maithili calendar
- Meitei calendar
- Odia calendar
- Punjabi calendar
- Nanakshahi calendar
- Tripuri calendar
- Tulu calendar

== See also ==
- Hindu chronology (disambiguation)
