= Solar Hijri calendar =

Official calendar of Iran

Today (at UTC+00)
- Monday, 2 November 2026
- Solar Hijri: 11 Aban, SH 1405
Other calendars
Akan	Nwonadwo
Armenian	15 Trē 1476
Aztec	Atlcahualo 11, 11 Cuetzpalin
Babylonian	20 Tashritu, 2337 SE
Balinese pawukon	Luang, Pepet, Beteng, Laba, Pon, Aryang, Coma of Sinta, Indra, Dangu, Pati
Bengali	17 Kartik, BS 1433
Chinese	Yang Metal Dragon・Net Mansion; Fire Horse Year, Month 9, Day 24 (Shuangjiang, 5 days until Lidong)
Common Era	2 November 2026 CE
Coptic	23 Paopi, AM 1743
Egyptian	20 Phamenoth, 2775 NE
Ethiopian	23 Ṭeqemt, 2019 Amätä Məhrät
French Republican	Décade II, Primidi de Brumaire de l'Année 235 de la République
Gregorian	2 November, AD 2026
Hebrew	22 Cheshvan, AM 5787
Hindu	Puṣya・Śubha; Solar: 16 Kārtika, 1948 SE; Lunisolar: Aṣṭamī, Kṛishna pakṣa of Āśvina, 2083 VE; Rāudra・5127 KY・1,872,881
Icelandic	Mánudagur, 10 Gormánuður 2026
Islamic	21 Jumada al-awwal, AH 1448 (using tabular method)
ISO week date	2026-W45-1
Japanese	23 Nagatsuki, Reiwa 8 (Sōkō, 5 days until Rittō)
Julian	20 October, AD 2026 (AM 7535)
Julian day	2461347
Korean	23 Gaedal, 4359 DE
Maya	13.0.14.1.4; 17 Zac, 11 Kan
Roman	ante diem XIII Kalendas Novembres, MMDCCLXXIX AUC
Tibetan	23 tha skar, me pho rta 2153 or 1772 or 1000

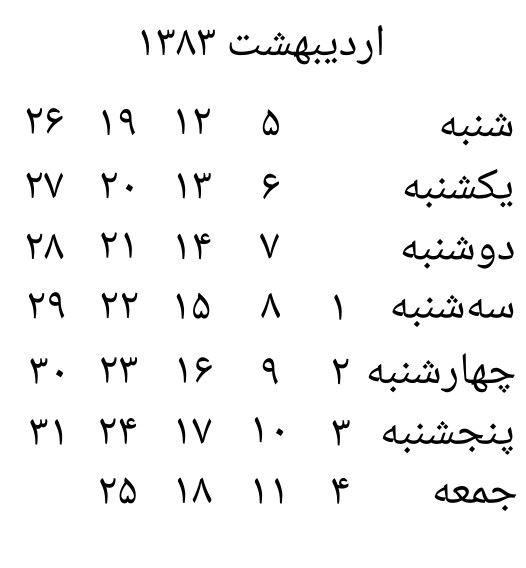
A Solar Hijri calendar of year 1383 SH showing the second month of Ordibehesht (thus April–May 2004; see conversion table below). The month's name comes from the Avestan word for Asha.

The Solar Hijri calendar (Note: Persian: گاه‌شماری هجری شمسی, romanized: Gâhšomâri-ye Hejri-ye Šamsi Pashto: لمريز لېږدیز کلیز, romanized: lmaríz legdíz kalíz Kurdish: ڕۆژژمێری کۆچیی ھەتاوی, romanized: Salnameya Koçberiyê) is the official calendar of Iran and the most widely used calendar in Afghanistan. It is a solar calendar, based on the Earth's orbit around the Sun. Each year begins on the day (Note: If the exact moment of astronomical March equinox occurs before noon (Tehran time), that day is considered the first day of Farvardin. If the equinox occurs after noon, the following day is designated as the first day of Farvardin.) of the March equinox and has years of 365 or 366 days. It is sometimes also called the Shamsi calendar, Khorshidi calendar, Persian calendar, or Iranian Solar calendar and the most recent of the Iranian calendars. It is abbreviated as SH, HS, AP, or, sometimes as AHSh, while the lunar Hijri calendar (commonly known in the West as the 'Islamic calendar') is usually abbreviated as AH.

The epoch (very first day of the first year) of the Solar Hijri calendar was the day of the spring equinox, March 19, 622 CE. The calendar is a "Hijri calendar" because that was the year that Muhammad is believed to have left from Mecca to Medina; this event is referred to as the Hijrah.

The calendar is widely used by many Central Asian and West Asian ethnic groups, such as the Kurds, Pashtuns, Tajiks, Hazaras, Persians, Azerbaijanis, Yazidis, Lurs, Gilaks, Mazanderanis, Qashqais, Khorasani Turks, Nuristanis, Pashayis, Aimaqs, and Talysh people. Smaller groups of Turkmens, Balochs, Uzbeks, and Arabs also use this calendar.

Since the calendar uses astronomical observations and calculations for determining the vernal equinox, it theoretically has no intrinsic error in matching the vernal equinox year. According to Iranian studies, it is older than the lunar Hijri calendar used by the majority of Muslims (known in the West as the Islamic calendar); though they both count from the year of the Hijrah. The solar Hijri calendar uses solar years and is calculated based on the "year of the Hijrah," and the lunar Hijri calendar is based on lunar months, and dates from the presumed actual "day of the Hijrah".

Each of the twelve months of the solar Hijri calendar corresponds with a zodiac sign. In Iran before 1925 and in Afghanistan before 2023, the names of the zodiacal signs were used for the months; elsewhere the month names are the same as in the Zoroastrian calendar. The first six months have 31 days, the next five have 30 days, and the last month has 29 days in common years, 30 in leap years.

The ancient Iranian New Year's Day, which is called Nowruz, always falls on the March equinox. Nowruz is celebrated by communities in a wide range of countries from the Balkans to Central Asia.

== Structure ==
=== Epochal date ===
The calendar's epoch (first year) corresponds to the Hijrah in 622 CE, which is the same as the epoch of the Lunar Hijri calendar. Because it counts solar years rather than (shorter) lunar years, the two calendars' year numbers do not coincide with each other and are slowly drifting apart, being about 43 years apart as of 2023.

=== Days per month ===
The first six months (Farvardin–Shahrivar) have 31 days, the next five (Mehr–Bahman) have 30 days, and the last month (Esfand) has 29 days in common years or 30 days in leap years. This is a simplification of the Jalali calendar, in which the commencement of the month is tied to the sun's passage from one zodiacal sign to the next. The sun is travelling fastest through the signs in early January (Dey) and slowest in early July (Tir). The current time between the March and September equinoxes is about 186 days and 10 hours, the opposite duration about 178 days, 20 hours, due to the eccentricity of Earth's orbit. (These times will change slowly due to precession of the Earth's apsides, becoming inverted after around 11,500 years.)

=== New Year's Day ===
New Year's Day in this calendar is called Nowruz and is dated 1 Farvardin. The calendar year begins at the spring Equinox in the Northern Hemisphere, on or about 21 March in the Gregorian calendar. If the exact moment of astronomical equinox occurs before noon (Tehran time), that day is deemed to be 1 Farvardin ("Nowruz"). If the equinox occurs after noon, this day is 30 Esfand and the following day is designated as Nowruz. In other words, the first mid-day is on the last day of one calendar year, and the second mid-day is the first of the following year.

=== Leap years ===
Leap shifting of the Jalali calendar

This calendar is not determined by a mathematical formula and thus does not add formal leap days in the manner of the Julian or the Gregorian calendars. The number of days in a year (365 or 366) and thus the number of days in Esfand (29 or 30) are as many as are needed to ensure that Nowruz begins according to the New Year's Day rule above. Consequently, this calendar remains closely aligned to the solar year.

=== Months ===
Order	Days	Persian (Iran)		Dari (Afghanistan)		Tajik		Kurdish (Iran)		Pashto		Azerbaijani		Gregorian range	Zodiac sign
Order	Days	Native script	Romanized	Native script	Romanized	Native script	Romanized	Sorani script	Kurmanji script	Native script	Romanized	Arabic script	Latin script	Gregorian range	Zodiac sign
01	31	فروردین	Farvardin	حمل	Hamal	Фарвардин / Ҳамал	Farvardin / Hamal	خاکەلێوە	Xakelêwe	وری	Wrai	آغلار-گۆلر	Ağlar-gülər	March – April	♈️Aries
02	31	اردیبهشت	Ordibehesht	ثور	Sawr	Урдибиҳишт / Савр	Urdibihisht / Savr	گوڵان	Gulan (Banemer)	غويی	Ǧwayai	گۆلن	Gülən	April – May	♉️ Taurus
03	31	خرداد	Khordad	جوزا	Jawzā	Хурдод / Ҷавзо	Khurdod / Javzo	جۆزەردان	Cozerdan	غبرګولی	Ǧbargolai	قؽزاران	Qızaran	May – June	♊️ Gemini
04	31	تیر	Tir	سرطان	Saratān	Тир / Саратон	Tir / Saraton	پووشپەڕ	Pûşper	چنګاښ	Cungāx̌	قوْرا بیشیرن	Qora bişirən	June – July	♋️ Cancer
05	31	مرداد / امرداد	Mordad / Amordad	اسد	Asad	Мурдод / Асад	Murdod / Asad	گەلاوێژ	Gelawêj	زمری	Zmarai	قۇیرۇق دوْغان	Quyruq doğan	July – August	♌️ Leo
06	31	شهریور	Shahrivar	سنبله	Sunbula	Шаҳривар / Сунбула	Shahrivar / Sunbula	خەرمانان	Xermanan	وږی	Wəǵai	زۇمار	Zumar	August – September	♍️ Virgo
07	30	مهر	Mehr	میزان	Mīzān	Меҳр / Мизон	Mehr / Mizon	ڕەزبەر	Rezber	تله	Təla	خزل	Xəzəl	September – October	♎️ Libra
08	30	آبان	Aban	عقرب	ʿAqrab	Обон / Ақраб	Obon / Aqrab	گەڵاڕێزان	Xezelwer (Gelarêzan)	لړم	Laṛam	قؽروْو	Qırov	October – November	♏️ Scorpio
09	30	آذر	Azar	قوس	Qaws	Озар / Қавс	Ozar / Qavs	سەرماوەز	Sermawez	ليندۍ	Lindəi	آذر	Azər	November – December	♐️ Sagittarius
10	30	دی	Dey	جدی	Jadī	Дай / Ҷадӣ	Day / Jadī	بەفرانبار	Befranbar	مرغومی	Marǧumai	چیلله	Çillə	December – January	♑️ Capricorn
11	30	بهمن	Bahman	دلو	Dalwa	Баҳман / Далв	Bahman / Dalv	ڕێبەندان	Rêbendan	سلواغه	Salwāǧa	دوْندۇران	Donduran	January – February	♒️ Aquarius
12	29/30	اسفند / اسپند	Esfand / Espand	حوت	Hūt	Исфанд / Ҳут	Isfand / Hut	ڕەشەمە	Reşeme	كب	Kab	بایرام	Bayram	February – March	♓️ Pisces

The first day of the calendar year, Nowruz ("New Day"), is the greatest festival of the year in Iran, Afghanistan, and some surrounding historically Persian-influenced regions. The celebration is filled with many festivities and runs a course of 13 days, the last day of which is called siz-dah bedar (سیزده‌بدر; "outdoor 13th"), or formally Nature Day (روز طبیعت).

The Dari (Afghan Persian) month names are the signs of Zodiac. They were used in Iran in the early 20th century when the solar calendar was being used.

=== Days of the week ===
In the Iranian calendar, every week begins on Saturday and ends on Friday. The names of the days of the week are as follows: shanbeh, yekshanbeh, doshanbeh, seshanbeh, chahārshanbeh, panjshanbeh and jom'eh. Yek, do, se, chahār, and panj are the Persian words for the numbers one to five. The name for Friday, jom'eh, comes from Arabic (جمعة). Jom'eh is sometimes referred to by the native Persian name, ādineh [ɒːdiːne] (آدینه). In some Islamic countries, including Iran and Afghanistan, Friday is the weekly holiday.

== Current usage ==
As of 2024 CE, the only official user of the calendar is Iran.

=== Iran ===
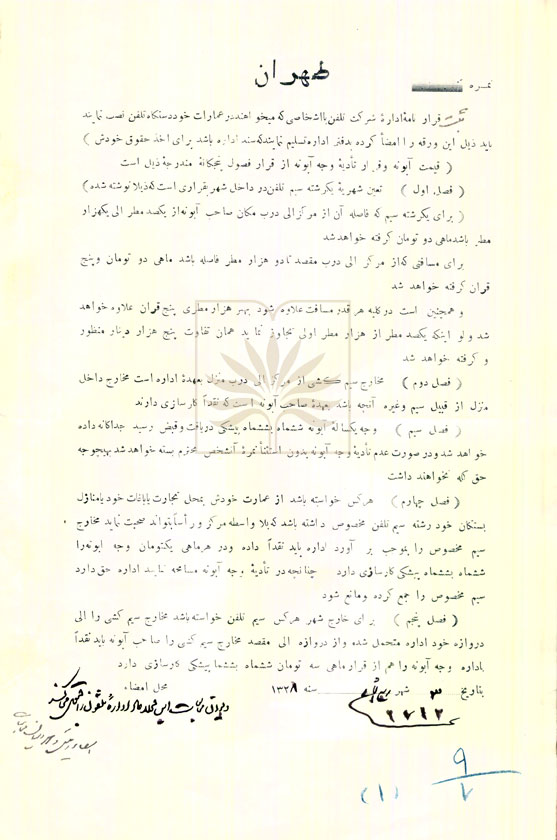
A Persian-language contract published in Tehran on 14 April 1910, which used Lunar Hijri calendar

On 21 February 1911, the second Iranian parliament adopted as the official calendar of Iran a sidereal calendar with months bearing the names of the twelve constellations of the zodiac and month lengths varying based on the astronomical events; it remained in use until March 1925. The present Iranian calendar was legally adopted on 31 March 1925, the last year of the Qajar era. The law stated that the first day of the year should be the first day of spring in "the true solar year", "as it has been" ever so. It also fixed the number of days in each month, which previously varied by year with the sidereal zodiac. It revived the ancient Persian names, which are still used. It also officially set the epoch to the Hijrah, although that epoch was already in use since the 1911 law. It also deprecated the 12-year cycles of the Chinese-Uighur calendar, which were not officially sanctioned but were commonly used.

=== Afghanistan ===
Afghanistan legally adopted the official Jalali calendar in 1922 but with different month names. Afghanistan uses Arabic names of the zodiacal signs; for example, the Saur Revolution in 1978 took place in the second month of the Solar Hijri calendar (Persian Ordibehesht; Saur is named after Taurus).

Under the Taliban's first rule from 1996 to 2001, the lunar Hijri calendar was imposed, thus changing the year overnight from 1375 to 1417.

=== Tajikistan ===
Tajikistan does not use the Solar Hijri calendar and has never done so, despite being part of the Persian-speaking world. The country does, however, celebrate Nowruz, although the official New Year's Day in Tajikistan is 1 January in the Gregorian calendar, which is also the case in other non-Persian speaking Iranian or Turkic communities ranging from Eastern Europe to Western China. The name of Tajikistan's capital, Dushanbe, is taken from the Solar Hijri calendar and translates to "Monday" in Persian.

== Comparison with Gregorian calendar ==
The Solar Hijri year begins about 21 March of each Gregorian year and ends about 20 March of the next year. (Note: The equinox can begin as early as 20 March or as late as 22 March.) To convert the Solar Hijri year into the equivalent Gregorian year add 621 or 622 years to the Solar Hijri year depending on whether the Solar Hijri year has or has not begun.

Correspondence of Solar Hijri and Gregorian calendars (Solar Hijri leap years are marked*)
33-year cycle	Solar Hijri year	Gregorian year	Solar Hijri year	Gregorian year
1	1354*	21 March 1975 – 20 March 1976	1387*	20 March 2008 – 20 March 2009
2	1355	21 March 1976 – 20 March 1977	1388	21 March 2009 – 20 March 2010
3	1356	21 March 1977 – 20 March 1978	1389	21 March 2010 – 20 March 2011
4	1357	21 March 1978 – 20 March 1979	1390	21 March 2011 – 19 March 2012
5	1358*	21 March 1979 – 20 March 1980	1391*	20 March 2012 – 20 March 2013
6	1359	21 March 1980 – 20 March 1981	1392	21 March 2013 – 20 March 2014
7	1360	21 March 1981 – 20 March 1982	1393	21 March 2014 – 20 March 2015
8	1361	21 March 1982 – 20 March 1983	1394	21 March 2015 – 19 March 2016
9	1362*	21 March 1983 – 20 March 1984	1395*	20 March 2016 – 20 March 2017
10	1363	21 March 1984 – 20 March 1985	1396	21 March 2017 – 20 March 2018
11	1364	21 March 1985 – 20 March 1986	1397	21 March 2018 – 20 March 2019
12	1365	21 March 1986 – 20 March 1987	1398	21 March 2019 – 19 March 2020
13	1366*	21 March 1987 – 20 March 1988	1399*	20 March 2020 – 20 March 2021
14	1367	21 March 1988 – 20 March 1989	1400	21 March 2021 – 20 March 2022
15	1368	21 March 1989 – 20 March 1990	1401	21 March 2022 – 20 March 2023
16	1369	21 March 1990 – 20 March 1991	1402	21 March 2023 – 19 March 2024
17	1370*	21 March 1991 – 20 March 1992	1403*	20 March 2024 – 20 March 2025
18	1371	21 March 1992 – 20 March 1993	1404	21 March 2025 – 20 March 2026
19	1372	21 March 1993 – 20 March 1994	1405	21 March 2026 – 20 March 2027
20	1373	21 March 1994 – 20 March 1995	1406	21 March 2027 – 19 March 2028
21	1374	21 March 1995 – 19 March 1996	1407	20 March 2028 – 19 March 2029
22	1375*	20 March 1996 – 20 March 1997	1408*	20 March 2029 – 20 March 2030
23	1376	21 March 1997 – 20 March 1998	1409	21 March 2030 – 20 March 2031
24	1377	21 March 1998 – 20 March 1999	1410	21 March 2031 – 19 March 2032
25	1378	21 March 1999 – 19 March 2000	1411	20 March 2032 – 19 March 2033
26	1379*	20 March 2000 – 20 March 2001	1412*	20 March 2033 – 20 March 2034
27	1380	21 March 2001 – 20 March 2002	1413	21 March 2034 – 20 March 2035
28	1381	21 March 2002 – 20 March 2003	1414	21 March 2035 – 19 March 2036
29	1382	21 March 2003 – 19 March 2004	1415	20 March 2036 – 19 March 2037
30	1383*	20 March 2004 – 20 March 2005	1416*	20 March 2037 – 20 March 2038
31	1384	21 March 2005 – 20 March 2006	1417	21 March 2038 – 20 March 2039
32	1385	21 March 2006 – 20 March 2007	1418	21 March 2039 – 19 March 2040
33	1386	21 March 2007 – 19 March 2008	1419	20 March 2040 – 19 March 2041

== Accuracy ==
Its determination of the start of each year is astronomically determined year-to-year as opposed to the more fixed Gregorian or Common Era calendar which, averaged out, has the same year length, achieving the same accuracy (a differently patterned calendar of 365 days for three consecutive years plus an extra day in the next year, save for three exceptions to the latter in a 400-year cycle). The start of the year and its number of days remain fixed to one of the two equinoxes, the astronomically important days when day and night each have the same duration. It results in less variability of all celestial bodies when comparing a specific calendar date from one year to others.

=== Birashk leap year proposal ===
Iranian mathematician Ahmad Birashk (1907–2002) proposed an alternative means of determining leap years. Birashk's book came out in 1993, and his algorithm was based on the same apparently erroneous presumptions as used by Zabih Behruz in his book from 1952. Birashk's technique avoids the need to determine the moment of the astronomical equinox, replacing it with a very complex leap year structure. Years are grouped into cycles which begin with four normal years, after which every fourth subsequent year in the cycle is a leap year. Cycles are grouped into grand cycles of either 128 years (composed of cycles of 29, 33, 33, and 33 years) or 132 years, containing cycles of 29, 33, 33, and 37 years. A great grand cycle is composed of 21 consecutive 128-year grand cycles and a final 132 grand cycle, for a total of 2820 years. The pattern of normal and leap years which began in 1925, will not repeat until the year 4745.

The accuracy of the system proposed by Birashk and other recent authors, such as Zabih Behruz, has been thoroughly refuted and shown to be less precise than the traditional 33-year cycle.

Each 2820-year great grand cycle proposed by Birashk contains 2137 normal years of 365 days and 683 leap years of 366 days, with the average year length over the great grand cycle of 365.24219852. This average is just 0.00000026 (2.6×10^{−7}) of a day shorter than Newcomb's value for the mean tropical year of 365.24219878 days, but differs considerably more from the mean vernal equinox year of 365.242362 days, which means that the new year, intended to fall on the vernal equinox, would drift by half a day over the course of a cycle.

== Temporary change of epoch and calendar name in Iran ==
On 14 March 1975 CE, during the Pahlavi era, the Majlis and Senate of Iran, in a joint session, changed the epoch of the calendar to be the supposed first year of the reign of Cyrus the Great (rather than the Hijrah of Muhammad), a change that thus established the "Shahanshahi Calendar". (Note: Persian: گاه‌شماری شاهنشاهی, romanized: Gâhšomâri-ye Šâhanšâhi (also known as the King of Kings calendar); not to be confused with the Zoroastrian Shahanshahi calendar.) This was done not as a new law, but a joint declaration (قطعنامه). The epoch was carefully chosen so that the ascension of Mohammad Reza Pahlavi to the throne would have happened in the "round" year 2500. Overnight, the year number changed from 1354 to 2534, a difference of 1180 years.

The change lasted until 27 August 1978 CE, (Note: a few months before the Iranian revolution in 1979) at which time the epoch was reverted to the Hijrah and the original year numbering was reinstated. The reversion was announced on the first day of the government of Prime Minister Jafar Sharif-Emami, and declared that the 1925 law (that introduced the Solar Hijri calendar) was still in effect.

== See also ==
- Arabic names of Gregorian months
- Assyrian calendar – Solar calendar used by modern Assyrian people
- Babylonian calendar – Lunisolar calendar
- Hebrew calendar – Lunisolar calendar used for Jewish religious observances
- Indian calendar (disambiguation) (many)
- Islamic calendar – Lunar calendar used by most Muslims
- Jalali calendar – Iranian calendar
- List of observances set by the Solar Hijri calendar
- Pre-Islamic Arabian calendar
- Rumi calendar – Specific calendar based on the Julian calendar (1839–1926)
- Zoroastrian calendar – Religious date system
