= Marǧūmay =

Tenth month in the Solar Hijri calendar

Marǧúmay (Pashto: مرغومی) is the name of the tenth month of the Afghan calendar. It occurs in the winter season, from December 21/22 to January 19/20. It has 30 days.

Marǧúmay corresponds with the tropical Zodiac sign Capricorn. Marǧúmay literally means markhor or a wild goat in Pashto.

== Observances ==
- Christmas Eve - 3 or 4 Marǧūmay
- Christmas - 4 or 5 Marǧūmay, celebrated by Christians of Afghan descent or within Afghanistan who use the Gregorian Calendar (Georgian date: December 25)
- Boxing Day - 5 or 6 Marǧūmay
- Traditional Epiphany and Armenian Christmas - 16 or 17 Dey
- Ethiopian Christmas - 17 or 18 Marǧūmay
- Feast of the Baptism of the Lord - 23 Marǧūmay (Traditional), fourth Sunday of Marǧūmay (modern)
- Traditional Epiphany (Julian Calendar) - 29 or 30 Marǧūmay

For those countries that observe Epiphany on the first Sunday of January following the New Year, the Solar Hijri date falls as the third Sunday of Marǧūmay.
