= Ordibehesht =

- Native name: اردیبهشت (Persian); ثَور (Dari); Gulan / Banemer (Kurdish); Урдибиҳишт / Савр (Tajik)
- Calendars: Solar Hijri calendar Zoroastrian calendar
- Month number: 2
- Number of days: 31
- Season: Spring
- Gregorian equivalent: April–May

Ordibehesht‌ or Ardibehesht (Persian: اردیبهشت, Persian pronunciation: [oɾdiːbeˈheʃt / æɾdiːbeˈheʃt]) is the second month of the Solar Hijri calendar, which is used officially in Iran and Afghanistan and of the Zoroastrian calendar. It has 31 days. It begins on 21 April and ends on 21 May in the Gregorian calendar. The Dari name for the month is Saur or Sowr and the Afghan Pashto name for it is Ǧwayai.

Its associated astrological sign in the tropical zodiac is Taurus.

Ordibehesht is the second month of the spring season (Bahar), and is followed by the month of Khordad.

== Events ==
- 13, S.H. 1265 – Haymarket affair (first police confrontation against workers' groups in Chicago)
- 4, S.H. 1294 – Landing at Anzac Cove (part of the Gallipoli campaign of World War I)
- 19. S.H. 1299 - Kiev Victory Parade (1920)
- 5, S.H. 1324 – National Liberation Committee declares war against the Nazi-backed Italian Social Republic
- 18, S.H. 1324 – End of World War II in Europe
- 1, S.H. 1346 – Coup d'état in the Kingdom of Greece
- 3, S.H. 1353 – Carnation Revolution (in the Portuguese Empire)
- 10, S.H. 1354 – Fall of Saigon (part of the Vietnam War)
- 7, S.H. 1357 – Saur Revolution
- 6, S.H. 1365 – Chernobyl disaster (in the Ukrainian SSR of the Soviet Union)
- 22, S.H. 1377 – Fall of Suharto (1998 riots in Indonesia following the Trisakti shootings; Suharto resigns as Indonesian president on 31 Ordibehesht)
- 26, S.H. 1382 – 2003 Casablanca bombings (series of suicide bombings by Muslim militants in Morocco)

== Holidays ==
- 1, 9 and 12 Ordibehesht – Ridván
- 4/5 Ordibehesht – Freedom Day (Portugal)
- 5/6 Ordibehesht – Anzac Day and Liberation Day (Italy)
- 10 Ordibehesht – Persian Gulf National Day
- 11 or 12 Ordibehesht – International Workers' Day and U.S. Loyalty Day
- 15 or 16 Ordibehesht - Star Wars Day
- 18 or 19 Ordibehesht – Victory in Europe Day
- 19 or 20 Ordibehesht– Victory Day (9 May), Europe Day
- Final Saturday – U.S. Armed Forces Day

== Deaths ==
- Day 2, S.H. 1373 – Richard Nixon, 37th president of the United States
- Day 17, S.H. 1391 – Iraj Ghaderi, Iranian film director and actor
- Day 24, S.H. 1392 – Mohammad Ezodin Hosseini Zanjani, Iranian Twelver Shia cleric
- Day 30, S.H. 1403 – Ebrahim Raisi, 8th president of the Islamic Republic of Iran
