= Čungāx̌ =

Fourth month of the Solar Hijri calendar

Čungā́x̌ (Pashto: چنګاښ), is the name of the fourth month of the Afghan calendar. It occurs in the summer season (from June 21/22 to July 21/22) and it has 31 days.

Čungāx̌ corresponds with the tropical Zodiac sign Cancer. Čungāx́̌ literally means "crab" in Pashto.

== Events ==
- 2 Čungāx̌ 1358 - Chindawol uprising begins
- 26 Čungāx̌ 1358 - 1973 Afghan coup d'état
