= Ǧbargolay =

Third month of the Solar Hijri calendar

Ǧbargoláy (Pashto: غبرګولی) is the third month of the Afghan calendar. It occurs from May 21/22 to June 20/21, and it has 31 days.

Ǧbargoláy associates with the tropical Zodiac sign Gemini. Ǧbargoláy literally means "twin" in Pashto.

== Observances ==
- Victoria Day - First Monday of Ǧbargolay
- Memorial Day - First or Second Monday of Ǧbargolay nearest to or on May 31 in the Gregorian
- Canadian Armed Forces Day - Third Sunday of Ǧbargolay
- Queen's Official Birthday - Fourth Saturday of Ǧbargolay
- Festa della Repubblica - 12 or 13 Ǧbargolay
- Constitution Day (Denmark) - 15 Ǧbargolay (14 in leap years)
- National Day of Sweden - 16 Ǧbargolay
- Russia Day and Independence Day (Philippines) - 22 Ǧbargolay
- Flag Day (United States) - 24 or 25 Ǧbargolay
