= Laṛam =

Eighth month of the Solar Hijri calendar

Laṛám (Pashto: لړم) is the name of the eighth month of the Afghan calendar. It has 30 days. The Dari word for the month is 'Aqrab.

Laṛám occurs in the autumn season (from October 22/23 to November 20/21). It corresponds with the tropical Zodiac sign Scorpio. Laṛám means "scorpion" in Pashto.

== Observances ==
- United States Navy Day - 5 or 6 Laram
- Republic Day in Turkey - 6 or 7 Laram
- Birthday of the Royal Marines and Czech Independence Day and anniversary of the foundation of Czechoslovakia - 6 or 7 Laram
- Halloween and Reformation Day - 9 Laram
- October Revolution Day (former), Day of Military Honour on the anniversary of the 1941 October Revolution Parades (current) - 16 Laram
- Victory Day (Azerbaijan) - 17 Laram
- United States Marine Corps birthday - 19 or 20 Laram
- Remembrance Day (Commonwealth)/Veterans Day - 20 or 21 Laram
- Remembrance Sunday (Great Britain) - Third Sunday of Laram
- Volkstrauertag - Last Sunday of Laram
