= Līndəi =

Ninth month of the Solar Hijri calendar

Lindә́i (Pashto: لیندۍ) is the name of the ninth month of the Afghan calendar. It occurs in the late autumn season (from November 21/22 to December 20/21). It has 30 days.

Lindә́i corresponds with the tropical Zodiac sign Sagittarius. Lindә́i literally means "bow" in Pashto.

== Observances ==
- Thanksgiving Day (United States) - 1st Thursday of Leendai
- Black Friday in the United States (shopping holiday, also marked in most other countries) - 1st Friday of Leendai
- Small Business Saturday in the United States - 1st Saturday of Leendai
- Cyber Monday - 2nd Monday of Leendai
- Giving Tuesday - 2nd Tuesday of Leendai
- Small Business Saturday (UK) - 2nd Saturday of Leendai
- Anniversary of the formation of the National Hockey League - 5 or 6 Leendai
- Afghan Armed Forces Day - 10 Leendai
- Pearl Harbor Day - 17 or 18 Leendai
- Black Friday in the United Kingdom - Last Friday of Leendai, may be occasionally celebrated on the first Friday of Marǧūmay before Western Christmas to match the date in the Gregorian calendar (held every last Friday before Christmas in the Gregorian calendar)
- Yaldā Night - 31 Leendai
