= Shahrivar =

- Native name: شهریور (Persian); سُنبُله (Dari); Xermanan (Kurdish); Шаҳривар / Сунбула (Tajik)
- Calendar: Solar Hijri calendar
- Month number: 6
- Number of days: 31
- Season: Summer
- Gregorian equivalent: August–September

Shahrivar (Persian: شهریور, Persian pronunciation: [ʃæhɾiːˈvæɾ]) is the sixth month of the Solar Hijri calendar, the official calendar of Iran and Afghanistan. Shahrivar has 31 days. It begins on 23 August and ends on 22 September in the Gregorian calendar. The Afghan Persian name is Sonbola; in Pashto it is Waǵay.

Shahrivar is the third and final month of summer. It is followed by Mehr.

The name of the month comes from the Zoroastrian deity Kshatra Vairya.

== Events ==
- 26 - 1299 - The American Professional Football Association, later the National Football League, officially begins operations with 14 teams. The league began with Ralph Hay assuming the league's leadership before handing over to Native American athlete Jim Thorpe who became the league's first Commissioner (then President).
- 9 - 1302 - Great Kantō earthquake in Japan
- 9 - 1318 - Invasion of Poland, beginning of Second World War in Central and Western Europe
- 25 -1318 - Soviet invasion of Poland begins
- 1 - 1324 - King Michael's Coup
- 18 - 1324 - 1944 Bulgarian coup d'état
- 11 - 1324 - Surrender of Japan
- 9 - 1336 - Independence of the Federation of Malaya proclaimed.
- 25 - 1342 - Proclamation of Malaysia
- 26 - 1383 - 1984 South Asian Games opens
- 1 - 1368 - Baltic Way demonstrations in the Soviet Union.
- 20 - 1380 - September 11 attacks
- 11 - 1383 - Beslan school siege in North Ossetian Autonomous Republic, Russia
- 23 - 1387 - Delhi bombings, India
- 5 (- 10) - 1391 - 16th Summit of the Non-Aligned Movement, in Tehran, Iran.
- 30 - 1392 - Westgate shopping mall attack in Kenya
- 22 - 1397 - Merrimack Valley gas explosions, Massachusetts, United States

== Births ==
- 01 - 359 - Ibn sina
- 05 - 243 - Abu Bakr al-Razi
- 30 - 1328 - Ahdieh, Iranian singer
- 18 - 1362 - Edwin Jackson, American baseball player, Olympic silver medalist

== Deaths ==
- 20 - 1392 - Abdolmohammad Ayati, Iranian scholar, translator, and writer.
- 17 - 1401 - Elizabeth II
- 25 - 1401 - Mahsa Amini

== Observances ==
- Day of the National Flag (Ukraine), Black Ribbon Day and Liberation from Fascist Occupation Day (Romania and Moldova) - 1-2 Shahrivar
- Independence Day of Ukraine - 2-3 Shahrivar
- Day of Combat Against British Colonialism - 3 Shahrivar
- Cincture of the Theotokos, Independence Day (Malaysia) - 8/9 Shahrivar
- Beginning of the Indiction-Ecclesiastical Year of the Eastern Orthodox Churches - 10 Shahrivar
- Victory over Japan Day - 11-12 Shahrivar
- Nativity of the Theotokos - 16 or 17 Shahrivar
- Enkutatash - 20-21 Shahrivar
- Feast of the Cross - 23-24 Shahrivar
- Mexican Independence Day and Malaysia Day - 25 Shahrivar
- United States Air Force Day and Chilean Independence Day - 27-28 Shahrivar
- Chilean Army Day - 28-29 Shahrivar
