= Bhadro =

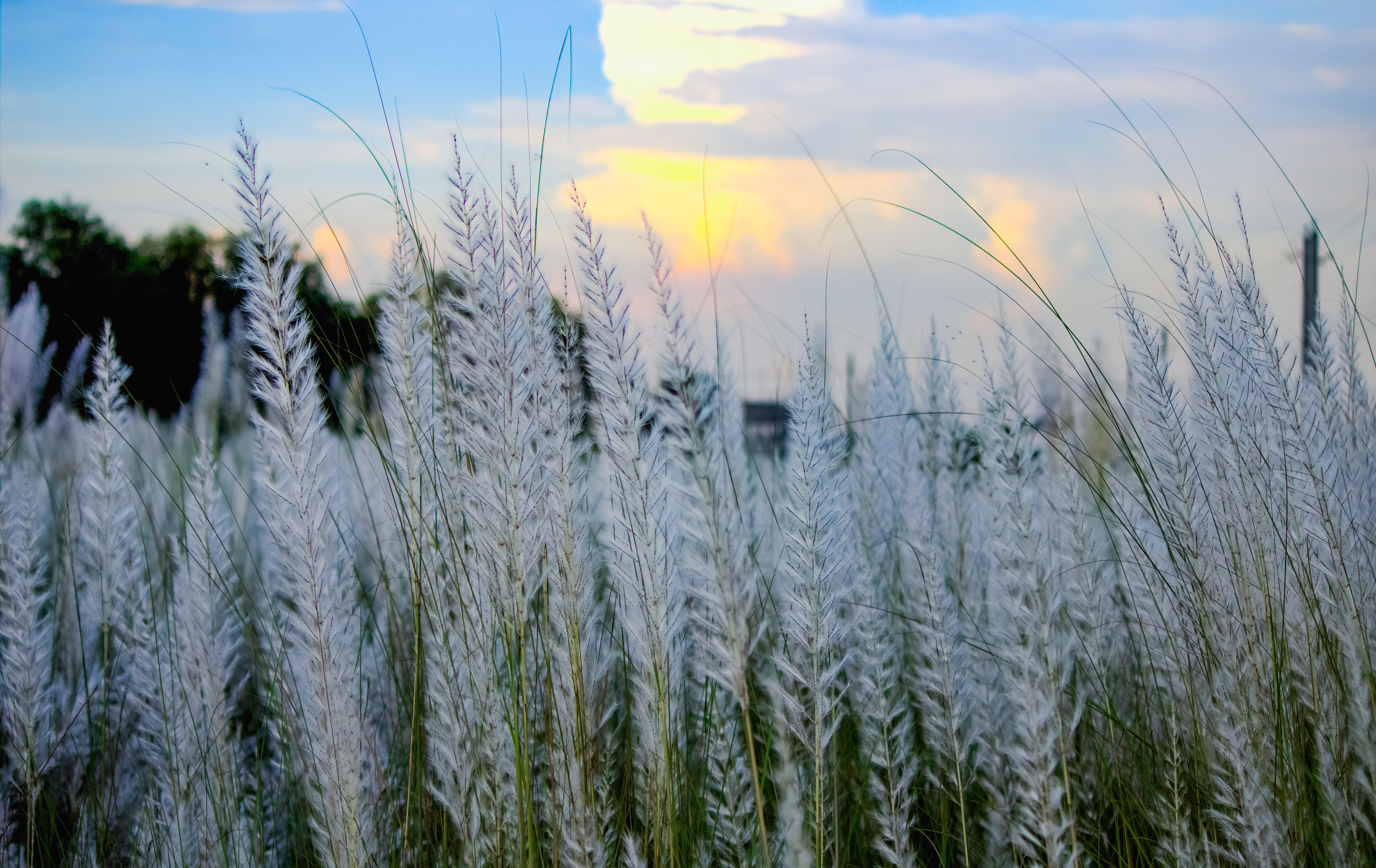
- Kans Grass, locally known as Kashful, in the backdrop of clear blue sky signals the arrival of Bhadro in Bangladesh
- Native name: ভাদ্র (Bengali)
- Calendar: Bengali calendar
- Month number: 5
- Number of days: 31 (Bangladesh); 30/31/32 (India)
- Season: Shorot (Autumn)
- Gregorian equivalent: August-September

Bhadro (Bengali: ভাদ্র, romanized: Bhadrô) is the fifth month in the Bengali calendar. Bhadro marks the beginning of autumn. According to the modified calendar developed by the Bangla Academy, the month of Bhadro has 31 days from 16 August to 16 September in Bangladesh.

== Etymology ==
Bhadro is named after the star Purbobhadropod (Bengali: পূর্বভাদ্রপদ, romanized: Purbôbhadrôpôd).

== Events ==
- 2 Bhadro – 2 people were killed and over 115 people were injured during the 2005 Bangladesh bombings in 1412 Bangabda.
- 12 Bhadro – The national poet of Bangladesh, Kazi Nazrul Islam, died in 1383 Bangabda.

== See also ==
- Bengali calendar
- Culture of Bangladesh
