= Zmaray =

Fifth month of the Solar Hijri calendar

Zmaráy (Pashto: زمری) is the name of the fifth month of the Afghan calendar. It occurs within the summer season (from July 22/23 to August 21/22) and contains 31 days.

Zmaray corresponds with the tropical Zodiac sign Leo. Zmaráy literally means "lion" in Pashto. It is also used as a given name.

== Events ==
- 16 - 1298 - The Anglo-Afghan Treaty of 1919 is signed by the governments of Great Britain and Afghanistan, putting an end to the brief Third Anglo-Afghan War.
- 27 - 1298 - Afghanistan regains its independence from being a British protectorate.

== Observances ==
- Birthday of Simón Bolívar and Colombian and Venezuelan Navy Day - 2 Zmaray
- United States Coast Guard Day - 13 Zmaray
- National Day (Singapore) - 18 Zmaray
- Independence Day (Pakistan) - 22 or 23 Zmaray
- Assumption and Dormition of the Blessed Virgin Mary and Independence Day (India) - 23 or 24 Zmaray
- Independence Day (Indonesia) - 26 Zmaray
- National Aviation Day (United States) and Afghan Independence Day- 28 Zmaray
