= Ǧwayai =

Second month of the Solar Hijri calendar

Ǧwayáy (Pashto: غویی) or Ghwayai is the second month of the Afghan calendar. It has 31 days and falls within the spring season (from April 20/21 to May 20/21).

Ǧwayáy corresponds with the tropical Zodiac sign Taurus. Ǧwayáy literally means "bull" in Pashto.

== Events ==
- 18 - 1324 - End of World War II in Europe
- 10 – 1354 – Fall of Saigon
- 7 - 1357 - The Saur Revolution led by the pro-Soviet People's Democratic Party of Afghanistan ousts President of Afghanistan Mohammed Daoud Khan, leading to his death and that of his family.
- 6 – 1365 – Chernobyl disaster
- 25 - 1367 - Soviet withdrawal from Afghanistan begins

== Holidays ==
- 8 - Mujahideen Victory Day
- 11 - International Workers' Day
- 18 or 19 -Victory in Europe Day
- 19 or 20 - Victory Day (9 May)
- Last Saturday of Ǧwayay - United States Armed Forces Day
