= Wrai (month) =

First month of the Afghan calendar

Wray (Pashto: وری) or Worai is the first month of the Afghan calendar. It has 31 days and starts with the beginning of the spring season (Gregorian March 21, but sometimes March 20).

Wray corresponds with the tropical Zodiac sign Aries. Wray literally means "lamb" in Pashto.

== Observances ==
- Nauruz
- Easter Triduum - the three days before the first Sunday on or after the first full moon of Wray (Christian observance)
  - Maundy Thursday - Thursday on or after the full moon of Wray (Christian observance)
  - Good Friday - Friday on or after the full moon of Wray(Christian observance)
  - Holy Saturday - Saturday on or full moon of Wray (Christian observance)
- Easter - the first Sunday on or after the first full moon of Wray (Christian observance)
- Baháʼí Naw-Rúz - 1 Wray (Baháʼí holiday)
- Opening Day - Thursday or Friday of the first or second week of Wray (movable, date set by Major League Baseball, falls on the Nauruz period)
- Pakistan Day - 3 Wray
- Feast of the Annunciation, Independence Day (Bangladesh) and Greek Independence Day - 5-6 Wray
- Qingming Festival - 15-17 Wray
- International Day of Sport for Development and Peace - 17 or 18 Wray
- Jackie Robinson Day and One Boston Day- 26 or 27 Wray
