= Khordad =

- Native name: خُرداد (Persian); جَوزا (Dari); Cozerdan (Kurdish); Хурдод / Ҷавзо (Tajik)
- Calendar: Solar Hijri calendar
- Month number: 3
- Number of days: 31
- Season: Spring
- Gregorian equivalent: May–June

Khordad (Persian: خرداد, Persian pronunciation: [xoɾˈdɒːd]) is the third month of the Solar Hijri calendar. Khordad has thirty-one days. It begins in May 22 and ends in June 21 by the Gregorian calendar. Khordad is the third month of the spring season. It is followed by Tir. The Afghan Persian name is Jawzā (جَوزا). The name is derived from the deity name Haurvatat.

The Shast-Sheshi festival held annually near Isfahan is a remnant of the pre-Islamic Zoroastrian feast of Khordadgan, dedicated to the divinity Khordad, the female guardian of water.

== Events ==
- 2-3 – 1244 – Grand Review of the Armies
- 16 – 1323 – the Normandy landings of 1944 take place in the beaches of northern Normandy in France.
- 12 – 1325 – 1946 Italian institutional referendum
- 16 – 1325 – The National Basketball Association is officially founded with Maurice Podoloff, concurrent president of the American Hockey League, as its founding president.
- 6 – 1371 – 22 English football teams, which had left the ranks of the English Football League in 1370–71, form an independent Premier League in the UK, becoming the top tier pro football league of English football. The new league's first games are slated for 24 Mordad.
- 11 – 1380 – Nepalese royal massacre
- 24 - 1404 - Twelve-Day War begins

== Deaths ==
- 2 – 1390 – Nasser Hejazi, an Iranian football player and coach.
- 12 – 1392 – Jalal Al-Din Taheri, Iranian scholar, theologian and Islamic philosopher.
- 16 – 1383 – Ronald Reagan, 40th president of the United States
- 25 – 1391 – Hassan Kassai, Iranian iconic master of Persian classical music.
- 27 – 1392 – Jalil Shahnaz, Iranian maestros.
- 31 – 1392 – Abdol-Aziz Mirza Farmanfarmaian, Iranian architect.

== Observances ==
- Victoria Day – First Monday of Khordad
- Memorial Day – First or Second Monday of Khordad
- Canadian Armed Forces Day – Third Sunday of Khordad
- King's Official Birthday – Fourth Saturday of Khordad
- Khordadegan – 6 Khordad
- Festa della Repubblica – 12 or 13 Khordad
- Constitution Day (Denmark) – 15 Khordad (14 in leap years)
- National Day of Sweden – 16/17 Khordad
- Russia Day and Independence Day (Philippines) – 22/23 Khordad
- Flag Day (United States) – 24 or 25 Khordad
