= Waǵay =

Sixth month of the Solar Hijri calendar

Wáǵay (Pashto: وږی) is the name of the sixth month of the Afghan calendar. It occurs in the late summer season (from August 22/23 to September 21/22) and contains 31 days.

Wáǵay corresponds to the tropical Zodiac sign Virgo. Wáǵay literally means "virgin" in Pashto.

== Observances ==
- Independence Day of Ukraine - 2 Waǵay
- Independence Day (Malaysia) - 9 Waǵay
- Victory over Japan Day - 11 Waǵay
- Martyrs' Day (Afghanistan) - 18 Wagay
- Mexican Independence Day and Malaysia Day - 25 Waǵay
- United States Air Force Day and Chilean Independence Day - 27-28 Waǵay
- Chilean Army Day - 28-29 Waǵay
