= Tir (month) =

- Native name: تیر (Persian); سرطان (Dari); Pûşper (Kurdish); Тир / Саратон (Tajik)
- Calendar: Solar Hijri calendar
- Month number: 4
- Number of days: 31
- Season: Summer
- Gregorian equivalent: June-July

Tir (Persian: تیر, Persian pronunciation: [tiːɾ]) is the fourth month of the Solar Hijri calendar, which is the official calendar of Iran and Afghanistan. Tir has thirty-one days, spanning from 22 June to 22 July in the Gregorian calendar. In Afghan Persian it is called Saraṭān (Cancer).

Tir is the first month of summer, and is followed by Mordad. Named after, Tishtrya, a Zoroastrian benevolent divinity associated with life-bringing rainfall and fertility.

== Events ==
- 14 - 1155 - The Second Continental Congress adopts the Declaration of Independence of the United States.
- 24 - 1168 - Storming of the Bastille
- 11 - 1246 - The British North America Act takes effect, marking the unification of the British Province of Canada, Nova Scotia, and New Brunswick into one Dominion of Canada.
- 2 - 1273 - International Olympic Committee established
- 1 - 1320 - World War II - Operation Barbarossa begins (Defense of Brest Fortress)
- 3 - 1324 - Moscow Victory Parade of 1945
- 7 - 1360 - Hafte Tir bombing in Tehran
- 4 - 1370 - Independence of Slovenia and Croatia from Yugoslav Federation; triggering the start of the Yugoslav War.
- 8 - 1374 - Sampoong Department Store collapse in South Korea
- 25 - 1395 - Attempted coup d'etat in Turkey

== Deaths ==
- 4 - 1392 - Taghi Rouhani, Iranian radio news anchor.
- 7 - 1360 - Mohammad Beheshti, one of the architects of the Islamic Republic of Iran
- 22 - 1391 - Hamid Samandarian, Iranian film and theater director and translator.
- 26 - 1390 - Rouhollah Dadashi, Iranian Powerlifter, Bodybuilder and Strongman.
- 29 - 1391 - Mohammad Hassan Ganji, an Iranian meteorologist and academic.

== Observances ==
- Olympic Day - 2 or 3 Tir
- Canada Day - 10 or 11 Tir
- Tirgan - 13 Tir
- Independence Day (United States) - 14 or 15 Tir
- Independence Day (Venezuela) - 15 or 16 Tir
- Mongolian State Flag Day - 18 or 19 Tir
- Naadam - 19/20 to 22/23 Tir
- Bastille Day - 24 or 25 Tir
