= The Reckoning of Time =

Computation of Easter by Bede

The Reckoning of Time (Latin: De temporum ratione, CPL 2320) is a Medieval Latin treatise written by the Northumbrian monk Bede in 725.

== Background ==
In mid-7th-century Anglo-Saxon England, there was a desire to see the Easter season less closely tied to the Jewish Passover calendar, as well as a desire to have Easter observed on a Sunday.

Continuing a tradition of Christian scholarship exploring the correct date of Easter, a generation later, Bede sought to explain the ecclesiastical reasoning behind the Synod of Whitby's decision in 664 to favour Roman custom over Irish custom.

Bede's resulting treatise provides justification for a precise calculation for Easter. It also explains why time, and the various units of time, are sacred.

== Structure ==
The treatise includes an introduction to the traditional ancient and medieval view of the cosmos, including an explanation of how the Earth influenced the changing length of daylight, of how the seasonal motion of the Sun and Moon influenced the changing appearance of the new moon at evening twilight, and a quantitative relation between the changes of the tides at a given place and the daily motion of the Moon.

The Reckoning of Time describes the principal ancient calendars, including those of the Hebrews, the Egyptians, the Romans, the Greeks, and the Anglo-Saxons. The focus of De temporum ratione was calculation of the date of Easter, for which Bede described the method developed by Dionysius Exiguus. De temporum ratione also gave instructions for calculating the date of the Easter full moon, for calculating the motion of the Sun and Moon through the zodiac, and for many other calculations related to the calendar.

Bede based his reasoning for the dates on the Hebrew Bible. The functions of the universe and its purpose are generally referred to a scriptural foundation. According to the introduction by Faith Wallis in the 1999 English translated edition of The Reckoning of Time, Bede aimed to write a Christian work that integrated the astronomical understanding of computing with a theological context of history. The book is also regarded by Bede to be a sequel to his works De natura rerum ("The Nature of Things") and De temporibus ("On Time").

== Sections ==
The work is divided into six sections:

=== Technical preparation (Chapters 1–4) ===
This section familiarises the reader with terminology regarding measurements.

In chapter 3 Bede defines a day as being 12 hours long. An hour consists of increments of puncti, partes and momenta. Each of which are small increments of time within the hour. The smallest increment of time is the atom.

=== The Julian calendar (Chapters 5–41) ===
Here, Bede gives an exhaustive overview of the date of the Earth's creation, the months, the weeks and the Moon.

He argues that the first day did not, as it was generally believed, take place at the time of an equinox. According to the religious accounts of God's creation of the universe, light was created on the first day. It was not until the fourth day, however, that God created the stars and therefore there was no measurement of hours.

Much of this section is devoted to the Moon. Bede goes into extensive detail about measuring the moon's cycles, the Moon's relationship to the Earth and Sun. Bede discusses the Moon's relationship to the tide and calculating kalends.

=== Anomalies of lunar reckoning (Chapters 42–43) ===
These two chapters pick up where the previous section left off on examining the irregularities of the Moon creating a leap year as well as why, according to Bede, the Moon appears older than it actually is.

=== The Paschal table (Chapters 44–65) ===
This section explores different year cycles that include varying numbers of months and days, determining the year cycle of Christ's incarnation, Easter, and other moon cycles.

=== The Major Chronicle (Chapter 66) ===
Bede gives an exhaustive description of the Six Ages of the World. The "Major Chronicle" is the starting point for several later chronicles, such as the Chronicon universale usque ad annum 741 and the Chronicon Moissiacense.

Bede details the First Age, from Adam to Noah, as being 1,656 years long according to the Hebrew Bible or 2,242 years according to the Septuagint.

The Second Age, from Noah to Abraham, is 292 years or 272 years long based on Bede's evaluation of the Hebrew Bible and Septuagint respectively.

The Third Age is said to be 942 years long according to both the Hebrew Bible and Septuagint spanning from Abraham to David.

The Fourth age is from David until the Babylonian exile. This is 473 years according to the Hebrew Bible or 485 according to the Septuagint.

The Fifth age is from the Babylonian exile to the advent of Christ.

The Sixth age is the current age lasting from the advent of Christ until the end of days.

=== Prophecy (Chapters 67–71) ===
Finally, Bede goes on to discuss the end of the Sixth Age, the Second Coming of Christ, the Antichrist, and Judgement Day, and the Seventh and Eighth ages of the world to come.

== See also ==
- Computus
- Easter controversy
- Ēostre
- Early Germanic calendars
