= Heathen holidays =

Holidays observed within the modern pagan movement of Heathenry

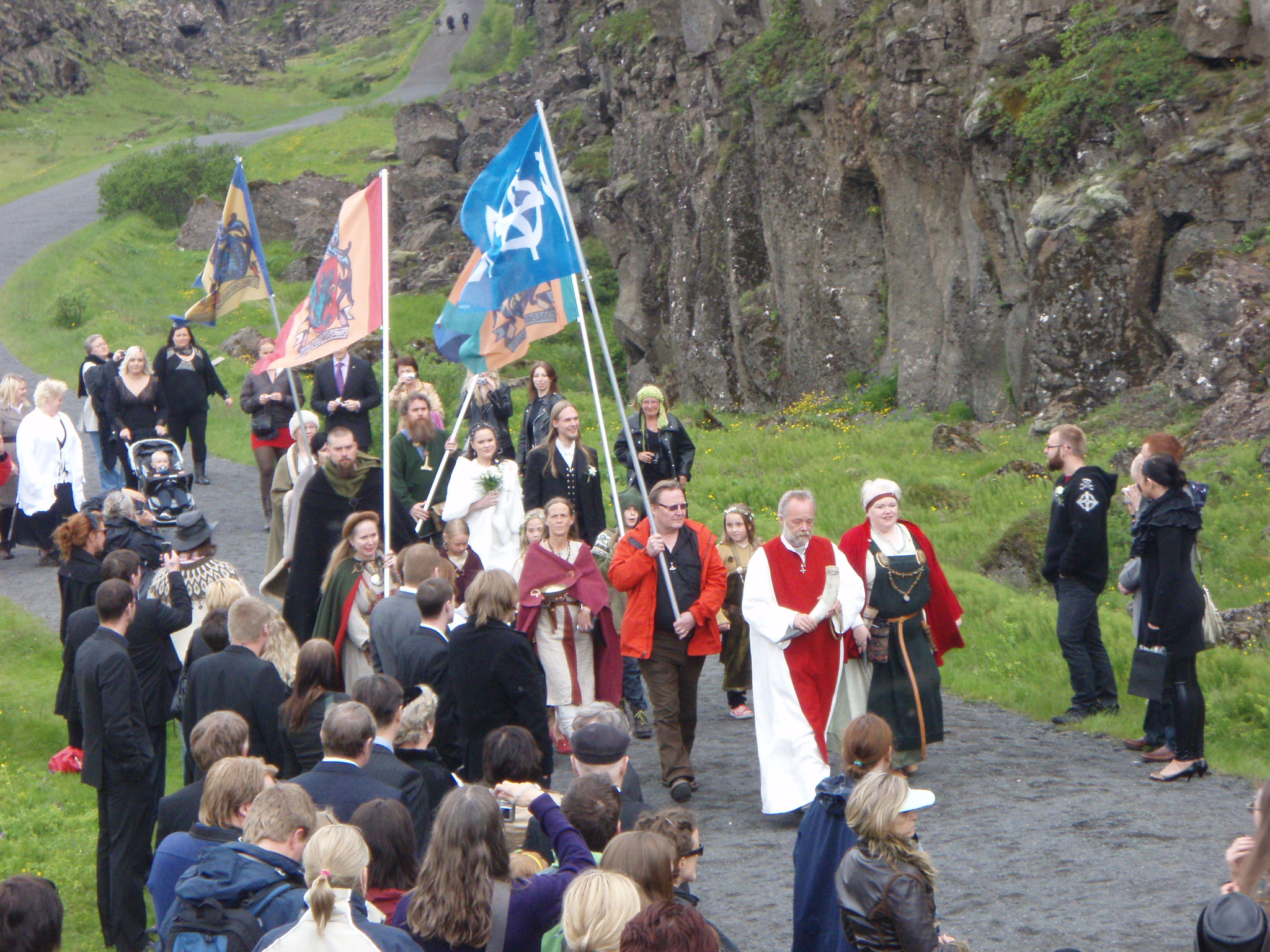
Members of the Ásatrúarfélagið preparing for a Þingblót at Þingvellir, Iceland

In the modern pagan movement of Heathenry there are a number of holidays celebrated by different groups and individuals. The most widely observed are based on ancient Germanic practices described in historical accounts or folk practices; however, some adherents also incorporate innovations from the 20th and 21st centuries.

== Pre-Christian Germanic holidays and their modern observance ==
Prior to Christianisation and the introduction of the Julian calendar, the Germanic peoples used a lunisolar calendar that was used to coordinate heathen seasonal festivals and holy periods. These included the Álfablót, Dísablót, Veturnáttablót and Blōtmōnaþ at the beginning of winter, Yule and Mōdraniht around Midwinter, and Hrēþmōnaþ and Sigrblót in the summer half of the year.

Beyond these, Adam of Bremen's account of the Temple at Uppsala describes a great festival that was held every nine years, however it has been argued that this would have been using inclusive counting and would thus have occurred every eight years by modern counting conventions.

Modern Heathens can celebrate a number of these festivals, with Winter Nights, Yule and Sigrblót being among the most widely observed, however the date is typically adjusted so that it falls on a weekend.

== Modern development ==
The modern Icelandic festival of Þorrablót is sometimes considered a "pagan holiday" due to folk etymology with the name of the god Thor. The name, while historically attested, is derived from Þorri which is not explicitly linked to Thor, instead being the name of a month in the historic Icelandic calendar and a legendary Finnish king. Despite this, toasts to Thor are commonly included in the modern celebration.

Beyond the information about historical practice given in Early Medieval sources, some Heathens use modern festival calendars that incorporate material from other new religious movements such as the "Wheel of the Year" popular in Wicca. This practice may be criticised by other Heathens, however, due to its origin in the 20th century and its lack of connection to historical celebrations.

In addition to this, several groups in the USA have designated holidays through ad hoc innovation, such as the various "Days of Remembrance" introduced by The Troth or "Vali's Day", derived from Valentine's Day by a folk etymology connection with the deity Váli.

Suggestions for rituals suited for these various holidays were published by Edred Thorsson, A Book of Troth (1989) and by Kveldulf Gundarsson, Teutonic Religion (1993). James Chisholm (1989) published a suggestion for Ostara. Chisholm argued for the reconstruction of the "sacred dramas" which he saw reflected in some Eddaic poems, although shorn of their sexual content by the Christian redactors. The revived ritual was again to be modified to suit "contemporary American sensibilities".

== Specific modern calendars ==
=== Samfundet Forn Sed Sverige (Sweden) ===
Samfundet Forn Sed Sverige has a list of annual holidays held during specific periods of the year.

| Date | Holiday | Notes |
|---|---|---|
| Late December (winter solstice) | Julblot Yule blót | Devoted to Odin and Freyr. |
| February | Disablot (Dísablót) | Devoted to the dísir. |
| Spring equinox | Vårblot (Spring blót) | Devoted principally to beings such as Freyja, Freyr, Sól and light elves, but also to Gerðr. |
| Late April - early May | Majblot (May blót) | Devoted principally to Freyr but also to beings such as Gerðr, Thor, Sif and Jörð. |
| Summer solstice | (Midsommarblot) (Midsummer) | Devoted principally to Freyr, Freyja but also to Sól and light elves. |
| Early August | Sensommarblot (Late-Summer blót) | Devoted principally to Thor and Sif. |
| Autumn equinox | Höstblot (Autumn blót) | Devoted to a range of beings including Skaði, Ullr, Freyr and Frigg. |
| October - November | Alvablot (Álfablót) | Devoted to ancestors and beings such as Freyr, Odin and the elves. |

=== The Troth (USA) ===
The handbook Our Troth: Heathen Life published by American-based inclusive Heathen organization The Troth in 2020, lists three holidays that most Heathens agree on, Yule (Winter Solstice or the first full moon after Winter Solstice), Winter Nights/Alfarblot/Disablot (begins on the second full moon after Autumnal Equinox and ends at new moon) and Summer Nights/Sigrblot (begins on the first full moon after Spring Equinox and ends at new moon).

Other holidays listed by the Troth include Disting (Second Full Moon of the New year), Lenzen (Full Moon Cycle around Vernal Equinox), Ostara (First Full Moon After Vernal Equinox), May Day (May 1), Midsummer/Litha (Summer Solstice), Lammas (Full moon after autumnal equinox) and Sunwait (starts 6 weeks before Winter Solstice).

=== Ingwine Heathenship (USA, UK and Belgium) ===
The movement Ingwina Hæðenscipe, which seeks to reconstruct West Germanic Heathen beliefs, also has a list of annual holidays held during specific periods of the year. The group provides both reconstructed, and entirely modern dates for these festivals for the benefit of modern practitioners.

| Date | Holiday | Notes |
|---|---|---|
| Late December (winter solstice) | Geóhol-blót Yule blót | Devoted to Woden, Ingui (with whom they identify Freyr), Wulð (with whom they identify Ullr), and other "Yule Beings". |
| Late December | Mōdraniht Mother's Night | Devoted to the Mother goddesses, or Idese. |
| Early January | Twelftadæg (Twelfth Day) | Devoted to Frig, and to nature spirits, see wassailing. |
| February | Sige-tiber (Victory blót) | Devoted to Woden, for victory in the forthcoming "Summer" months. |
| March | Lencten-tid (Spring Feast) | Devoted to the goddesses Hréðe, and Hludana. |
| April | Eáster-freólsdæg (Eostre's Feast) | Devoted to Eostre. |
| Summer solstice | Midsumordæg (Midsummer) | Devoted principally to Thunor, but also to Helith, with whom they associate good luck and healing. |
| Early August | Bendfeorm (Corn Reaping Feast) | Devoted principally to Beowa. This is a celebration of the corn harvest and subsequent "tying". The group eschews the term "Lammas" as it is mostly Christian in origin. |
| Late September | Hærfestlíc Freólsung (Harvest Festival) | Devoted to a range of beings including Ing, Thunor, Frig, and Woden. This is a celebration of the late harvest, and symbolic offering of the Last Sheaf. |
| October | Winter-fylleþ (Winter Full-Moon) | Devoted to ancestors and beings such as Ingui, Woden and the Elves. This is considered the beginning of Winter. |
| Mid November | Andetnes-blót (Thanksgiving blót) | Devoted to many beings. This is when historically, livestock that could not survive the winter would be slaughtered. |

== See also ==
- Thing (assembly)
- Slavic Native Faith's calendars and holidays
