= Goddess =

Feminine or female deity

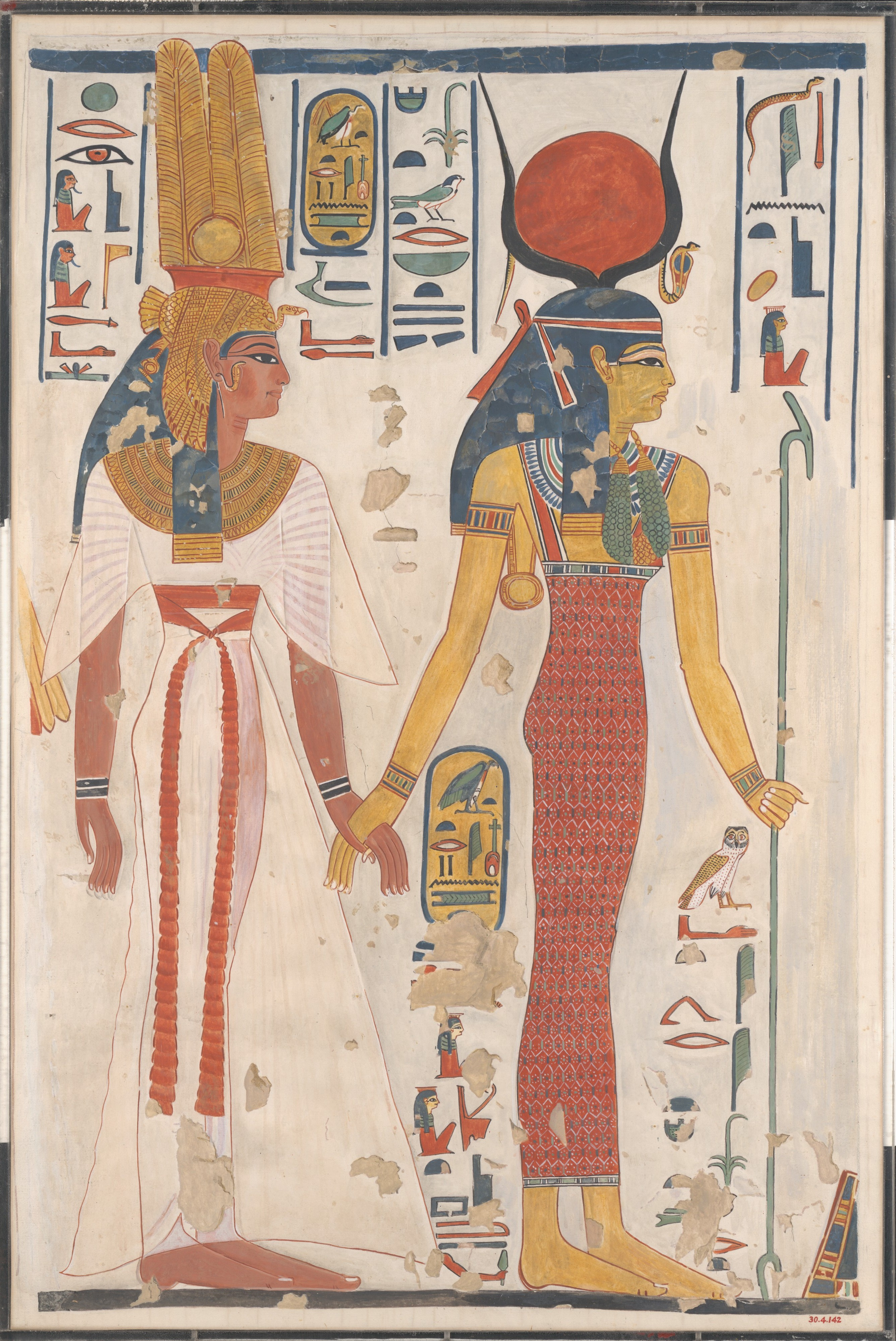
Queen Nefertari being led by Isis, the ancient Egyptian mother goddess of magic

A goddess is a female deity. In some faiths, a sacred female figure holds a central place in religious prayer and worship. For example, Shaktism (one of the three major Hindu sects), holds that the ultimate deity, the source of all reality, is Supreme Goddess (Mahamaya) and in some forms of Tantric Shaivism, the pair of Shiva and Shakti are the ultimate principle (with the goddess representing the active, creative power of God). Meanwhile, in Vajrayana Buddhism, ultimate reality is often seen as being composed of two principles depicted as two deities in union (yab yum, "father-mother") symbolising the non-duality of the two principles of perfect wisdom (female) and skillful compassion (male). A single figure in a monotheistic faith that is female may be identified simply as god because of no need to differentiate by gender or with a diminutive. An experiment to determine the effect of psychedelics on subjects composed of leaders from diverse religious groups revealed a general experience that the divine which the subjects encountered was feminine.

Polytheist religions, including Polytheistic reconstructionists, honour multiple goddesses and gods, and usually view them as discrete, separate beings. These deities may be part of a pantheon, or different regions may have tutelary deities. In many known cultures, goddesses are often linked with literal or metaphorical pregnancy or imagined feminine roles associated with how women and girls are perceived or expected to behave. This includes themes of spinning, weaving, beauty, love, sexuality, motherhood, domesticity, creativity, and fertility (exemplified by the ancient mother goddess cult). Many major goddesses are also associated with magic, war, strategy, hunting, farming, wisdom, fate, earth, sky, power, laws, justice, and more. Some themes, such as discord or disease, which are considered negative within their cultural contexts also are found associated with some goddesses. There are as many differently described and understood goddesses as there are male, shapeshifting, devilish, or neuter gods.

== Etymology ==
The noun goddess is a secondary formation, combining the Germanic god with the Latinate -ess suffix. It first appeared in Middle English, from about 1350. The English word follows the linguistic precedent of a number of languages—including Egyptian, Classical Greek, and several Semitic languages—that add a feminine ending to the language's word for god. Occasionally, one finds the root term being applied without the secondary ending.

== Historical polytheism ==
=== Ancient Near East ===
==== Mesopotamia ====
Inanna was the most worshipped goddess in ancient Sumer. She was later syncretised with the East Semitic goddess Ishtar. Other Mesopotamian goddesses include Ninhursag, Ninlil, Antu and Gaga.

==== Ancient Africa (Egypt) ====
- Goddesses of the Ennead of Heliopolis: Tefnut, Nut, Nephthys, Isis
- Goddesses of the Ogdoad of Hermopolis: Naunet, Amaunet, Kauket, Hauhet; originally a cult of Hathor
- Satis and Anuket of the triad of Elephantine

==== Canaan ====
Goddesses of the Canaanite religion: Ba`alat Gebal, Astarte, Anat.

==== Anatolia ====
- Arinniti: Hittite goddess of the sun. She became patron of the Hittite Empire and monarchy.
- Cybele: Her Hittite name was Kubaba, but her name changed to Cybele in Phrygian and Roman culture. Her influence can also be seen in Artemis as the Lady of Ephesus.
- Hebat: Mother goddess of the Hittite pantheon and wife of the leader sky god, Teshub. She was the origin of the Hurrian cult.
- Leto: A mother goddess figure in Lykia. She was also the main goddess of the capital city of the Lykia League (Letoon)

==== Pre-Islamic Arabia ====
In pre-Islamic Mecca, the goddesses Uzza, Manāt and al-Lāt were known as "the daughters of god". Uzzā was worshipped by the Nabataeans, who equated her with the Graeco-Roman goddesses Aphrodite, Urania, Venus and Caelestis. Each of the three goddesses had a separate shrine near Mecca. Uzzā was called upon for protection by the pre-Islamic Quraysh. In 624 AD, during the Battle of Uhud, the war cry of the Qurayshites was, "O people of Uzzā, people of Hubal!" (Tawil 1993).

According to Ibn Ishaq's controversial account of the Satanic Verses (q.v.), these verses had previously endorsed them as intercessors for Muslims, but were abrogated. Most Muslim scholars have regarded the story as historically implausible, while opinion is divided among Western scholars such as Leone Caetani and John Burton, who argue against it, and William Muir and William Montgomery Watt, who argue for its plausibility.

The Quran (Q53:19-31) warns of the vanity of trusting to the intercession of female deities, in particular "the daughters of god".

=== Indo-European traditions ===
Pre-Christian and pre-Islamic goddesses in cultures that spoke Indo-European languages.

==== Indian ====
- Agneya: or Aagneya is the Hindu Goddess of Fire.
- Prithivi: the Earth, also appears as a goddess. Rivers are also deified as goddesses.
- Ushas: is the main goddess of the Rigveda and is the goddess of the dawn.
- Varuni: is the Hindu Goddess of Water. Bhumi, Janani, Buvana, and Prithvi are names of the Hindu Goddess of Earth.

==== Iranian ====
- Anahita: or Nahid, or Arədvī Sūrā Anāhitā, or Aban: the divinity of "the Waters" and hence associated with fertility, healing, beauty and wisdom.
- Ashi: a divinity of fertility and fortune in the Zoroastrian hierarchy of yazatas.
- Daena: a divinity, counted among the yazatas, representing insight and revelation, hence "conscience" or "religion".
- Spenta Armaiti: or Sandaramet, one of the Amesha Spentas, a female divinity associated with earth and Mother Nature. She is also associated with the female virtue of devotion (to family, husband, and child). In the Iranian calendar, her name is on the twelfth month and also the fifth day of the month.

==== Greco-Roman ====
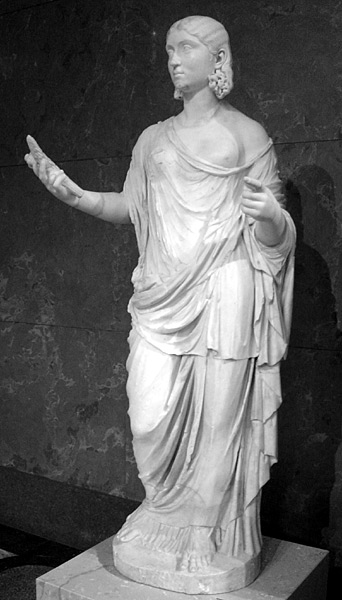
Statue of an unknown woman as Ceres, Roman goddess of agriculture and motherly relationships

- Eleusinian Mysteries: Baubo (goddess of mirth), Demeter (goddess of the harvest) and Persephone (goddess of spring, queen of the Underworld as the wife of Hades).
- Greek muses: Calliope (goddess of epic poetry), Clio (history), Erato (love poetry), Euterpe (music, song, and lyric poetry), Melpomene (tragedy), Polyhymnia (sacred poetry), Terpsichore (dance), Thalia (comedy and pastoral poetry), and Urania (astronomy).
- Aphrodite: Goddess of love and beauty.
- Artemis: Virgin goddess of the wilderness and the hunt.
- Athena: Virgin goddess of strategy, warfare, and crafts.
- Eris: Goddess of chaos.
- Gaia: Primordial goddess of the Earth. Most gods descend from her.
- Hecate: Goddess of sorcery and crossroads. Often considered a chthonic or lunar goddess. She is either portrayed as a single goddess or a triple goddess (maiden, mother, crone).
- Hera: Goddess of womanhood, marriage and childbirth, queen of Olympus as the wife of Zeus.
- Hestia: Virgin goddess of the hearth, domesticity and family.
- Iris: Goddess of rainbows.
- Leto: Titan goddess of childhood.
- Nike: Goddess of victory. She is predominantly pictured with Zeus or Athena and sometimes Ares.
- Selene: Titan goddess of the Moon.
- Rhea: Titan goddess of motherhood.

==== Celtic ====
Goddesses and otherworldly women in Celtic polytheism include:

- Celtic antiquity: Brigantia
- Gallo-Roman goddesses: Epona, Dea Matrona
- Irish mythology: Áine, Boann, Brigid, The Cailleach, Danu, Ériu, Fand and The Morrígan (Nemain, Macha, and Badb) among others.

The Celts honoured goddesses of nature and natural forces, as well as those connected with skills and professions such as healing, warfare and poetry. Celtic goddesses have diverse qualities such as abundance, creation, and beauty, as well as harshness, slaughter, and vengeance. They have been depicted as beautiful or hideous, old hags or young women, and at times may transform their appearance from one state to another, or into their associated creatures such as crows, cows, wolves or eels, to name but a few. In Irish mythology in particular, tutelary goddesses are often associated with sovereignty and various features of the land, notably mountains, rivers, forests and holy wells.

==== Germanic ====
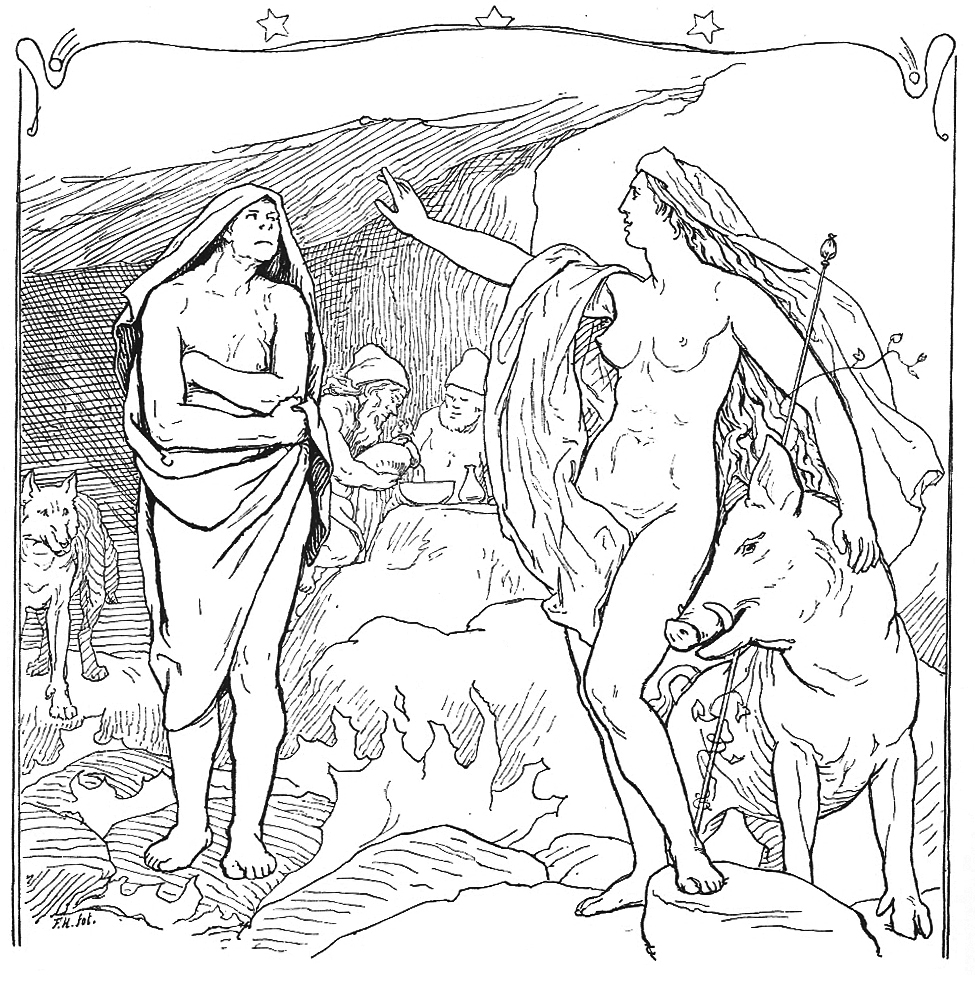
The goddess Freyja is nuzzled by the boar Hildisvíni while gesturing to Hyndla (1895) by Lorenz Frølich.

Surviving accounts of Germanic mythology and Norse mythology contain numerous tales of female goddesses, giantesses, and divine female figures in their scriptures. The Germanic peoples had altars erected to the "Mothers and Matrons" and held celebrations specific to these goddesses (such as the Anglo-Saxon "Mothers-night"). Various other female deities are attested among the Germanic peoples, such as Nerthus attested in an early account of the Germanic peoples, Ēostre attested among the pagan Anglo-Saxons, and Sinthgunt attested among the pagan continental Germanic peoples. Examples of goddesses attested in Norse mythology include Frigg (wife of Odin, and the Anglo-Saxon version of whom is namesake of the modern English weekday Friday), Skaði (one time wife of Njörðr), Njerda (Scandinavian name of Nerthus), that also was married to Njörðr during Bronze Age, Freyja (wife of Óðr), Sif (wife of Thor), Gerðr (wife of Freyr), and personifications such as Jörð (earth), Sól (the sun), and Nótt (night). Female deities also play heavily into the Norse concept of death, where half of those slain in battle enter Freyja's field Fólkvangr, Hel's realm of the same name, and Rán who receives those who die at sea. Other female deities such as the valkyries, the norns, and the dísir are associated with a Germanic concept of fate (Old Norse Ørlög, Old English Wyrd), and celebrations were held in their honour, such as the Dísablót and Disting.

=== Pre-Columbian America ===
==== Aztec ====
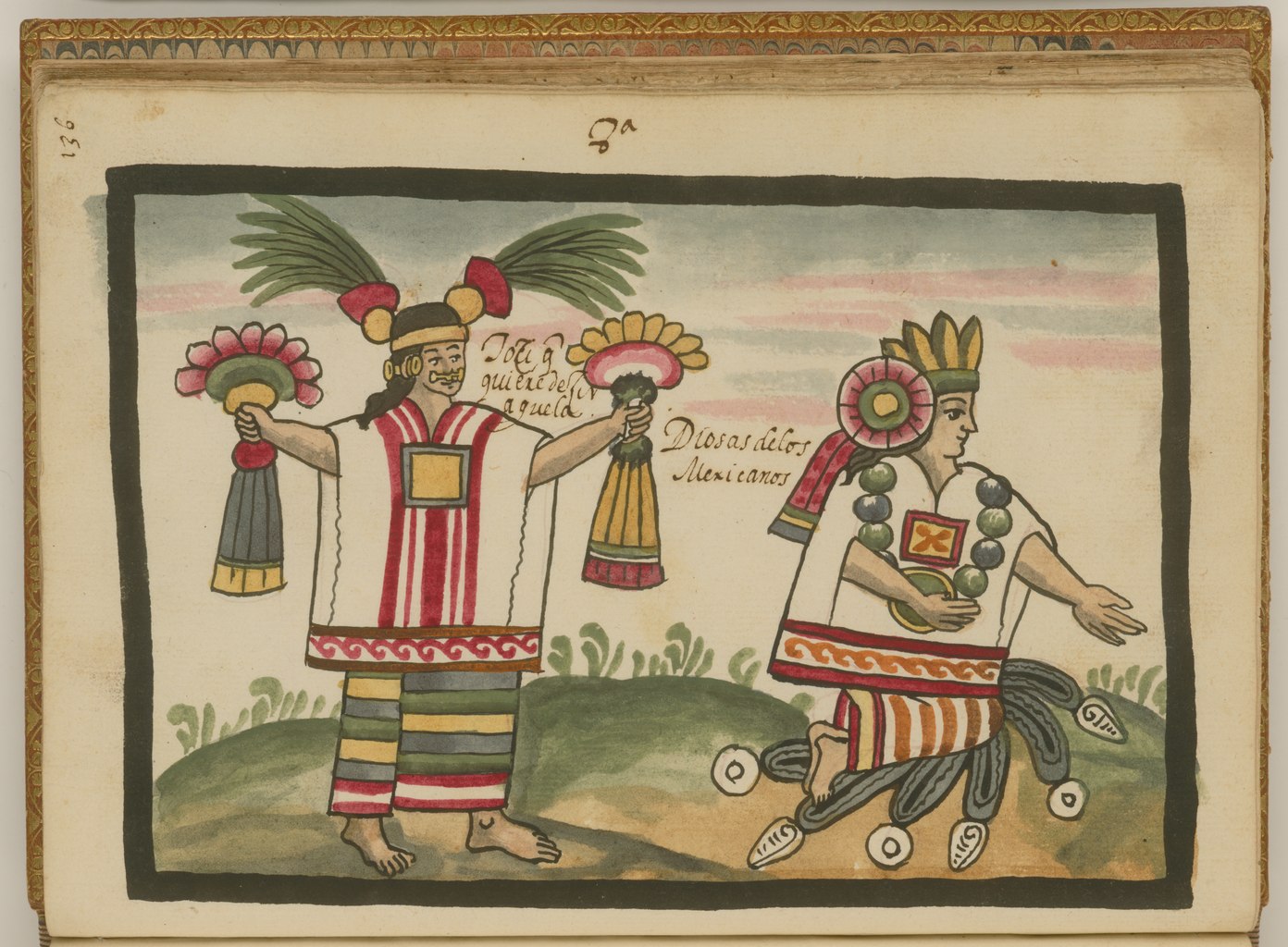
Xochiquetzal (left) and Chalchiuhtlicue (right) as depicted in the Tovar Codex.

- Chalchiuhtlicue: goddess of water (rivers, seas, storms, etc.) Jade symbolizes both the femininity of the goddess and water, since jade metaphorically denotes water due to the similarity of color and brilliance between water and jade.
- Chantico: goddess of the hearth, flames
- Coyolxauhqui: warrior goddess associated with the moon
- Duality Earth Goddesses: Cihuacoatl (childbirth and maternal death), Coatlicue (earth as the womb and grave), Tlazolteotl (filth and purification)
- Itzpapalotl: monstrous ruler of Tamoanchan (a paradise realm)
- Mictecacihuatl: queen of Mictlan (the underworld)
- Xochiquetzal: goddess of fertility, beauty, and female sexuality

In Aztec art, the concept of women is shown through skirts. Not only skirts but also necklaces with jade and pectorals can imply femininity.

==== Maya ====
- Ixchel: mother goddess
- Maya moon goddess
- Goddess I: eroticism, human procreation, and marriage

==== Inca ====
- Pachamama: the supreme Mother Earth
- Mama Killa: moon goddess
- Mama Ocllo: fertility goddess
- Mama Cocha: goddess of the sea and lakes

==== Native North America ====
Goddesses of various Native North American peoples include:

- Spider Grandmother: Creator goddess of the Southwestern United States
- Atahensic: Iroquois sky goddess
- Atira: Pawnee earth and corn goddess
- Tia: Haida goddess of peaceful death
- Sedna: Inuit goddess of the sea and underworld
- Atabey: Taino mother goddess

== Folk religion and animism ==
=== African religions ===
In African and African diasporic religions, goddesses are often syncretised with Marian devotion, as in Ezili Dantor (Black Madonna of Częstochowa) and Erzulie Freda (Mater Dolorosa). There is also Buk, a Sudanese and Ethiopian goddess still worshipped in the southern regions. She represents the fertile aspect of women. She is related to the deity of a similar name, Abuk. Another Ethiopian goddess is Atete, the goddess of spring and fertility. Farmers traditionally leave some of their products at the end of each harvesting season as an offering while women sing traditional songs.

A rare example of henotheism focused on a single Goddess is found among the Southern Nuba of Sudan. The Nuba conceive of the creator Goddess as the "Great Mother" who gave birth to earth and to humanity.

=== Chinese folk religion ===
- Mazu is the goddess of the sea who protects fishermen and sailors, widely worshipped in the south-eastern coastal areas of China and neighbouring areas in Southeast Asia.
- The Goddess Weaver Zhinü, daughter of the Celestial Mother, wove the stars and their light, known as "the Silver River" (what Westerners call "The Milky Way"), for heaven and earth. She was identified with the star Westerners know as Vega.

=== Shinto ===
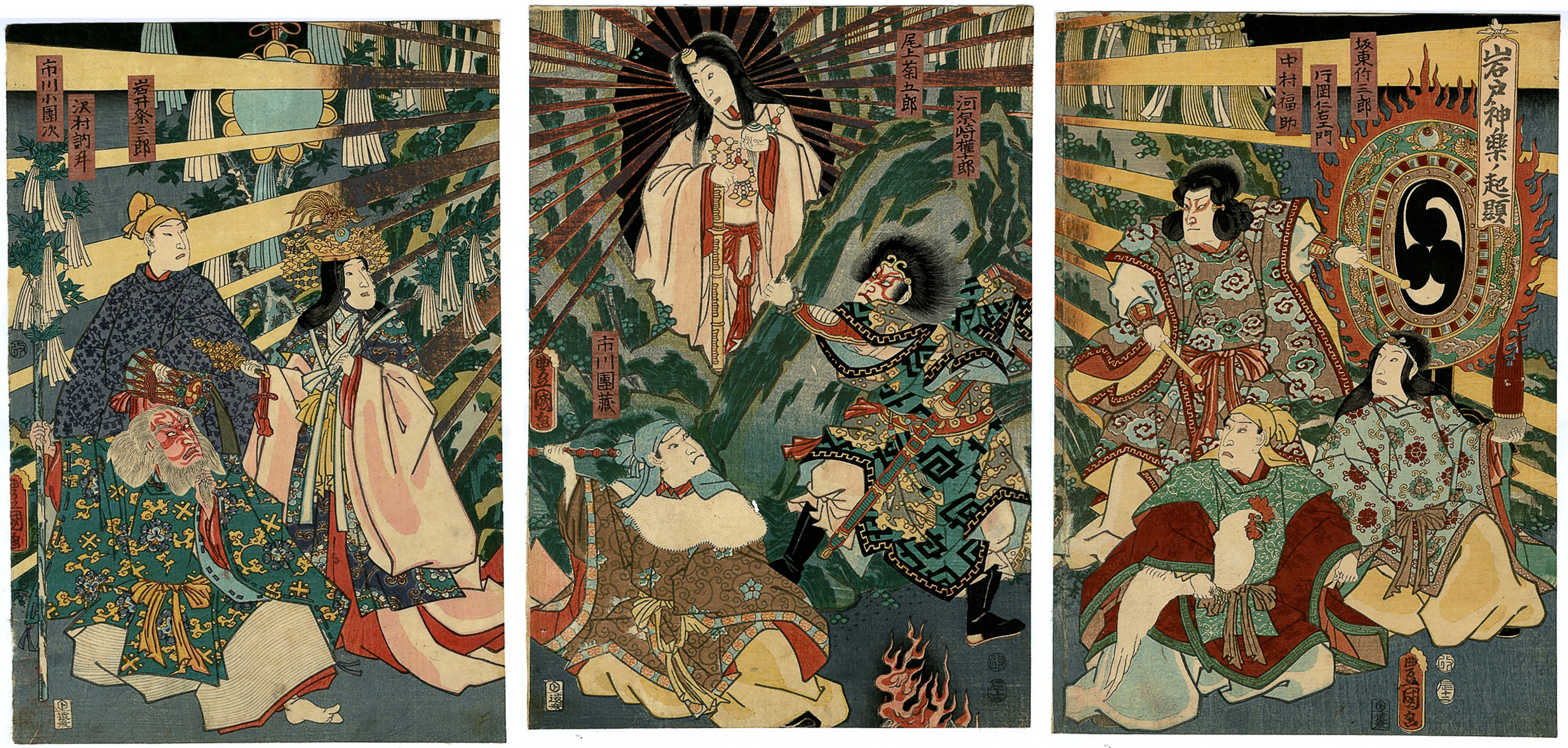
Amaterasu, goddess of the sun, emerges from the Heavenly Rock Cave, triptych by Utagawa Kunisada

Goddess Amaterasu is the chief among the Shinto gods (kami), while there are important female deities Ame-no-Uzume-no-Mikoto, Inari and Konohanasakuya-hime.

== Indian religions ==
In Indian religions (mainly Hinduism, Buddhism, and Jainism), many goddesses are widely venerated. The earliest source for several of these goddesses is the Vedas. However, goddesses can also be found in the art of the even more ancient Indus Valley civilisation.

=== Hinduism ===
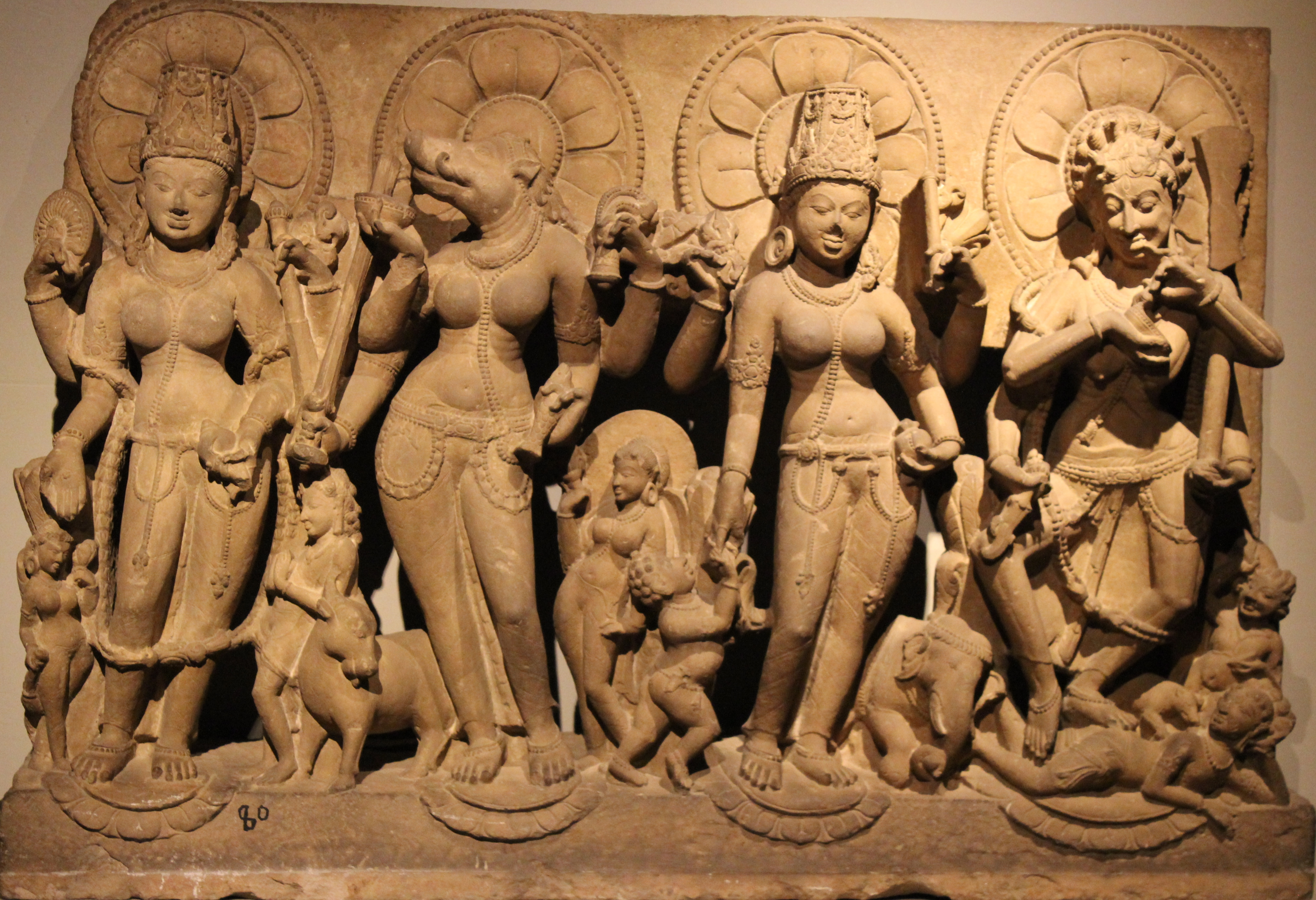
A relief depicting Hindu goddesses (from left to right) Vaishnavi, Varahi, Indrani, and Chamunda; National Museum of India

Hinduism is a diverse complex of many belief systems which includes numerous gods and goddesses. The earliest Hindu source, the Rigveda, contains many goddesses such as Prithvi (earth), Aditi (cosmic moral order), Vāc (sound), Nirṛti (destruction) and Saraswati. The Devīsūktam is an important source for the goddess idea in Vedic religion. Important Hindu goddesses today include Lakshmi, Saraswati, Durga, Kali, Tripurasundari, Parvati, and Radha.

There is much diversity in the theology of the various traditions of Hinduism. Some theologies (e.g., Advaita) see all gods and goddesses as emanations of a single formless impersonal source called Brahman. Other theologies are more personal regarding the ultimate deity.

Some traditions posit a dual deity in the form of Lakshmi-Vishnu, Radha-Krishna, Brahma-Saraswati, or Shiva-Parvati. These are presented as a pair with a male god (Shaktiman, "possessor of power") and his consort, a female "power" (Shakti), and their relationship is interpreted in different ways depending on the tradition's theology.

In Shaktism, the supreme deity is the Great Goddess (Mahadevi), called by different names such as Shakti or Adi Parashakti (Primordial Supreme Power). Shaktas consider the Goddess to be the ultimate source of all things and the mother of all gods and goddesses. She is considered to have ten main avatars called the ten mahavidyas in some traditions. Another important concept is the Shakta trinity, the tridevi, which sees Mahadevi as manifesting in three main goddesses: Mahasaraswati, Mahalakshmi, and Mahakali.

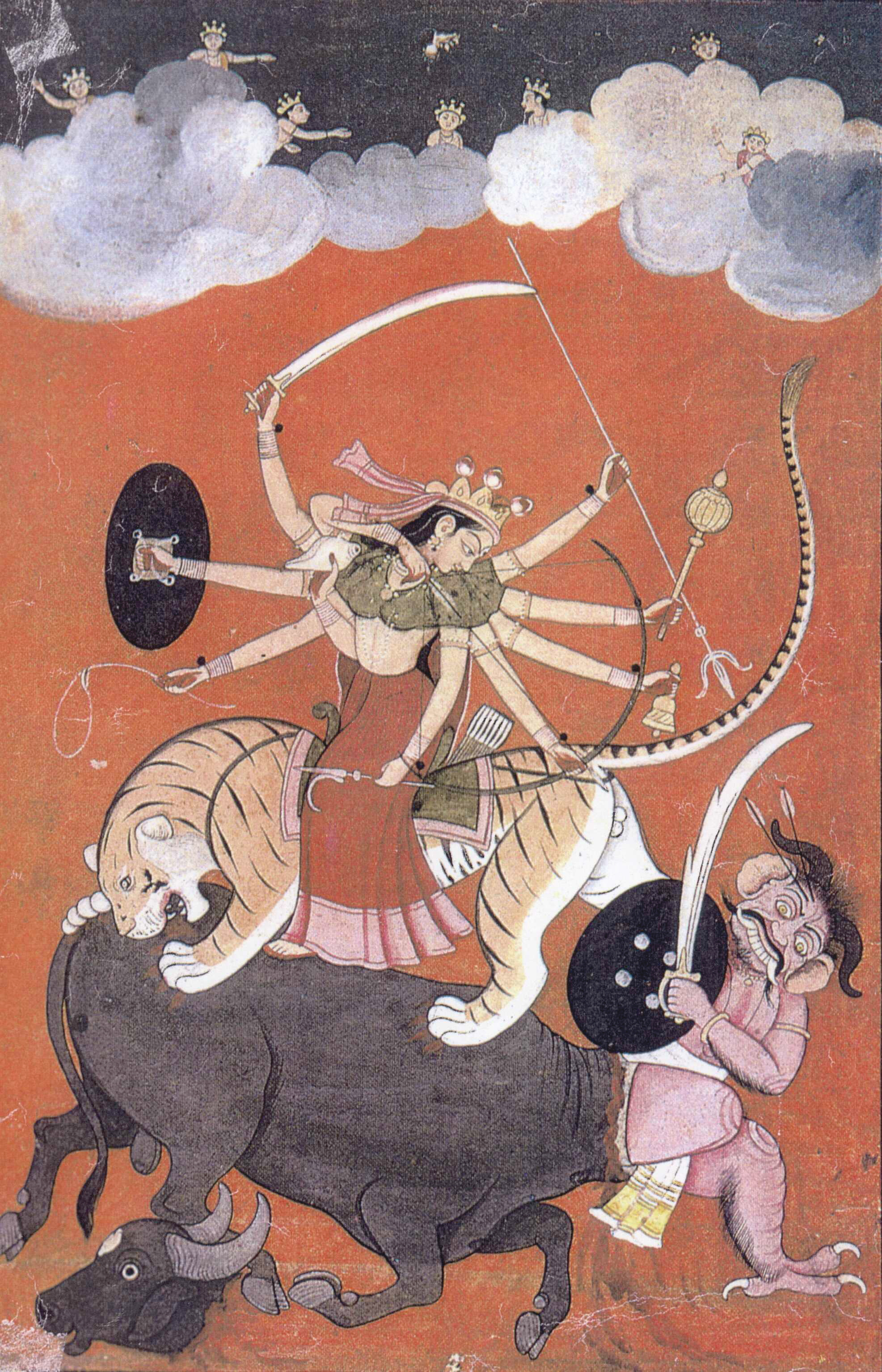
The Hindu warrior goddess Durga killing the buffalo-demon Mahishasura.

In the great Shakta scripture known as the Devi Mahatmya (Glory of the Goddess), all the goddesses are aspects of one presiding female force—one in truth and many in expression, which also is the creative power of the cosmos. It expresses through philosophical tracts and metaphor that the potentiality of masculine being is actuated by the feminine divine.

Local deities of different village regions in India were often identified with "mainstream" Hindu deities, a process that has been called Sanskritisation. Others attribute it to the influence of monism or Advaita, which discounts polytheist or monotheist categorisation. While the monist forces have led to a fusion between some of the goddesses (108 names are common for many goddesses), centrifugal forces have also resulted in new goddesses and rituals gaining ascendance among the laity in different parts of the Hindu world. Thus, the immensely popular goddess Durga was a pre-Vedic goddess who was later fused with Parvati, a process that can be traced through texts such as Kalika Purana (10th century), Durgabhaktitarangini (Vidyapati 15th century), Chandimangal (16th century), etc.

Widely celebrated Hindu festival Navaratri is in the honour of the divine feminine Devi (Durga) and spans nine nights of prayer in the autumn, also referred as Sharada Navratri.

=== Buddhism ===
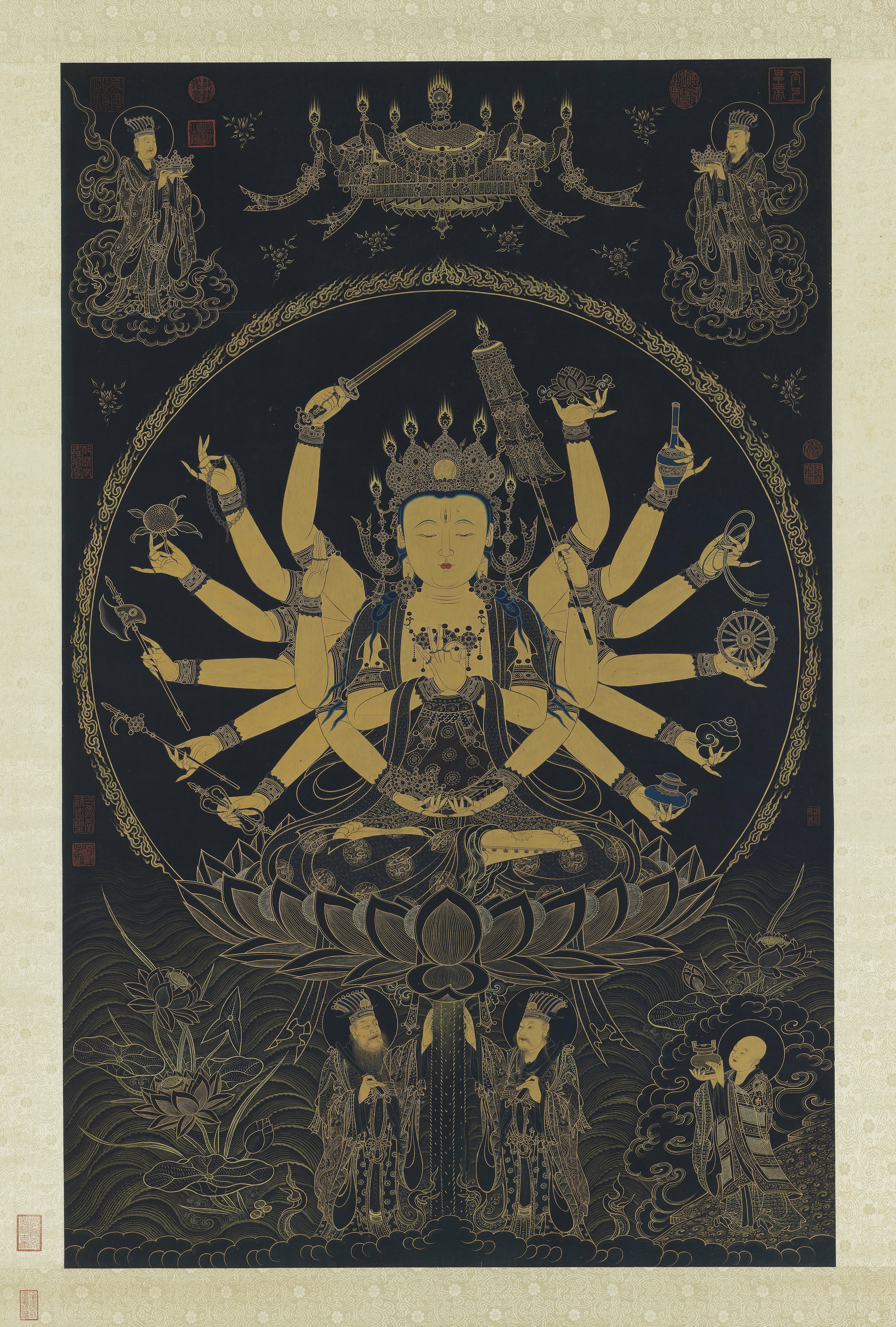
Cundī Buddha Mother (also known as Cundā), Ming dynasty (1368–1644).

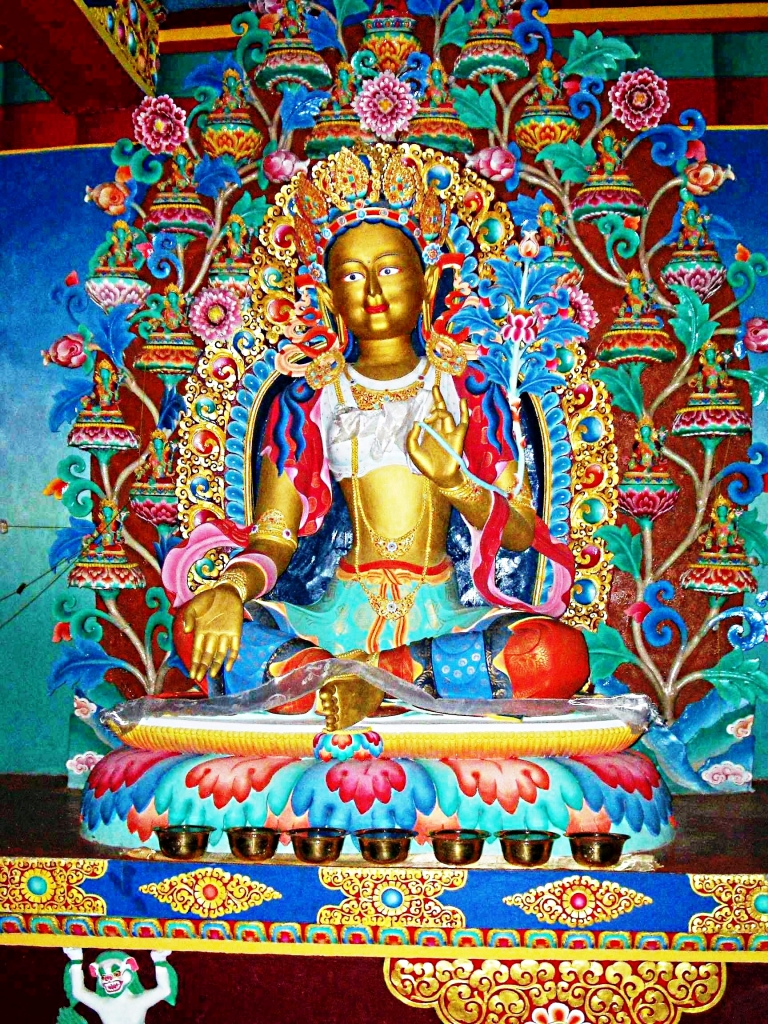
Statue of Tara, Urgyen Sanag Choling Gompa near Kulu, Himchal Pradesh

There are numerous female deities in the various Buddhist traditions. Buddhist goddesses are widely depicted in Buddhist art. Early Buddhism in India venerated various female goddesses. These were mostly considered to be devas or spirits (such as yakshinis). They include Prthivi (earth goddess), Hariti, Lakshmi, and Mayadevi (the mother of the Buddha). Some of these figures remain important in Theravada Buddhism today, including Maya and Prthivi (known as Phra Mae Thorani in Southeast Asia).

Indian Mahayana Buddhism revered several female deities, including Prajñāpāramitā Devi, Cunda, Marici, Sitātapatra, Tārā, Uṣṇīṣavijayā and Vasudhārā. In the Mahayana, female deities grew in importance, becoming powerful bodhisattva savior figures, liberators associated with powerful mantras (which are also termed vidyās when a mantra is seen as a feminine power) and dharanis. In some cases, such as with Prajñāpāramitā Devi, these goddesses were even called "mother of Buddhas" (Sanskrit: buddhamatr) and bhagavati, indicating they were seen as fully awakened Buddhas themselves.

In the Mahayana traditions, some are considered to be bodhisattvas (beings advancing on the path to Buddhahood) or full Buddhas, while others are just devas (worldly deities). The most important Buddhist female deities in East Asian Buddhism are the bodhisattva Guanyin and the "mother of Buddhas" Cundi. In Tibetan Buddhism, Tara is the most important female deity (often considered to be a full Buddha).

The tantric dakini Vajrayogini is an important tantric meditation deity (yidam) in Tibetan Vajrayana, and is also considered to be a female Buddha in her own right. Tantric Buddhist goddesses were often considered to be fully awakened Buddhas and sometimes are depicted with unique tantric elements, such as skullcups and flaying knives. These tantric deities include Simhamukha, Mahamaya, Vajrayogini, Chinnamunda and Kurukulla.

Mahayana goddesses are often termed "devis" (Sanskrit: devi, "female deity", "goddess", Tibetan: lhamo) or even bhagavani (the female version of bhagavan, indicating Buddhahood).

== Abrahamic religions ==
=== Judaism ===
==== Lilith ====
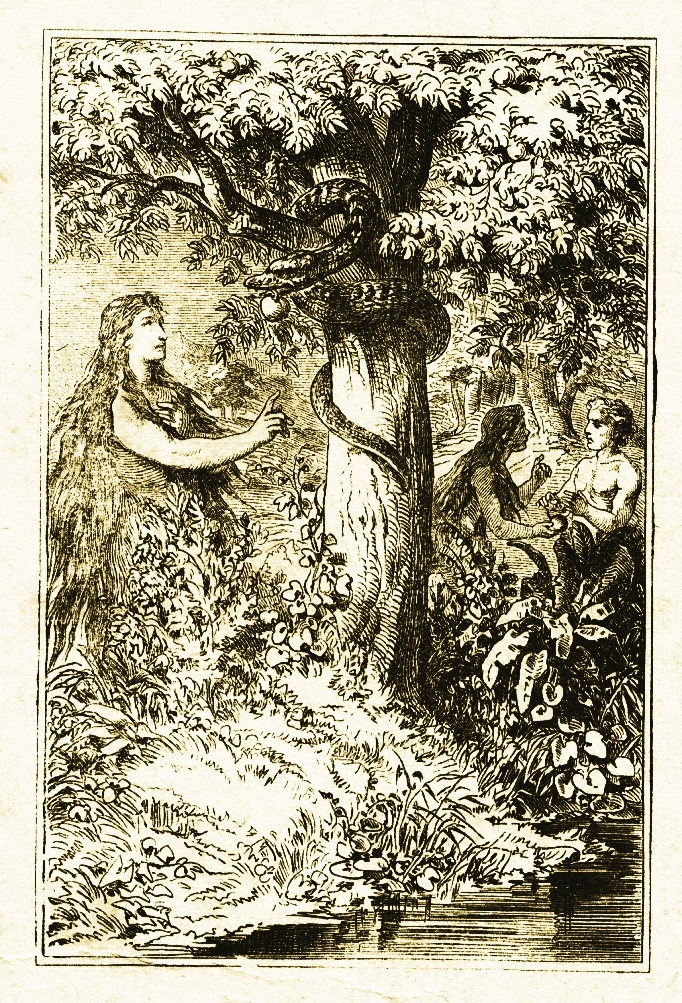
Lilith, illustration by Carl Poellath from 1886 or earlier

Lilith's earliest known mention is in the Songs of the Sage (1st century BCE) of the Dead Sea Scrolls, where she's a term for a demon, and later in Aramaic incantation bowls (starting from 4th century CE), that include plural male (lilin) and female liliths. They personify barrenness and abortion, are succubi associated with diseases, and are blamed for infant mortality.

According to the Alphabet of Ben Sira (7-10th century CE), Lilith is the name of Adam's first wife, who was created at the same time as him. She refused to lie beneath him, pronounced the Ineffable Name and flew away, leaving the Garden of Eden. Her story was greatly developed during the Middle Ages in the tradition of Aggadic midrashim, Kabbalah (including the Zohar), Jewish mysticism and Jewish folklore.

Lilith derives from the demonic goddess Lamashtu and the ghosts lilu, lilitu and ardat-lili.

==== Shekhinah ====
More commonly, modern Judaism acknowledges Shekhinah or Matronit as the feminine aspect of God. Shekhinah is considered to be the presence of God on Earth and/or the spirit of the Jewish people, forever trying to reunite with the other elements of God through tikkun olam. She is also associated with the moon, the earth, David, and Rachel.

==== Asherah, Anath, Astarte ====
As stated in the Old Testament, the Hebrew followers continued to worship "False Idols", like Asherah, as being as powerful as God. Jeremiah speaks of his (and God's) displeasure at this behaviour to the Hebrew people about the worship of the goddess in the Old Testament. The Canaanite Goddesses Astarte and Anath also feature in Hebrew texts.

=== Christianity ===
==== Apotheosis of Mary ====
Collyridianism was a Christian sect that emerged in the fourth century and consisted of women who considered the Virgin Mary to be a goddess. In the sixth century, another Christian sect called Al-maryamiyyun was mentioned, which believed that Mary is a goddess.

In 2006, The Remnant magazine published news about the emergence of a religious movement called "Mary-Is-God Catholic Movement" (MIGCM) in the Philippines that believes that the Virgin Mary is a goddess and that she is the third Hypostasis of the Trinity. The magazine described this movement as a revival of a sect, Collyridianism, which became Neo-Collyridianism. The Times reported that the founder of this group is called "Dominic Sanchez Falar".Dayton University published an article condemning this religious group.

Patrick Madrid, an American Catholic, author, pointed out that there are various modern forms of Collyridianism, noting that some people exaggerate their focus on Mary to the point of excluding or almost excluding Jesus, which he considers a sin bordering on idolatry. He also mentioned that there is a feminist movement that worships the Mother Goddess and portrays God in feminine terms

==== Veneration of Mary ====
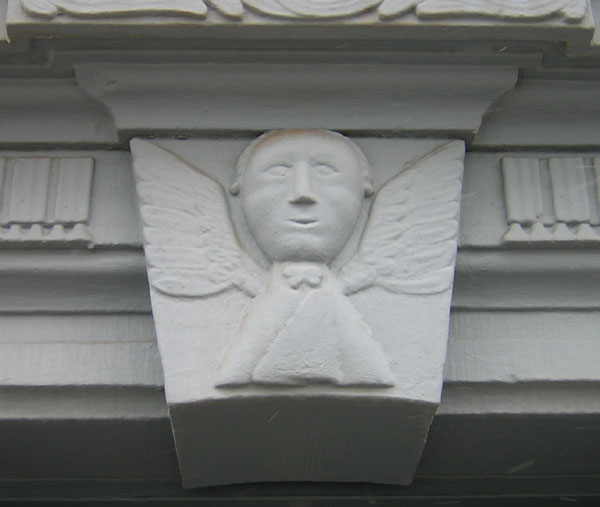
Virgin Sophia design on a Harmony Society doorway in Harmony, Pennsylvania, carved by Frederick Reichert Rapp (1775–1834)

The veneration of Mary, the mother of Jesus, as an especially privileged saint, has continued since the beginning of the Catholic faith. Mary is venerated as the Mother of God, Queen of Heaven, Mother of the Church, the Blessed Virgin Mary, Star of the Sea, and other lofty titles.

Marian devotion similar to this kind is also found in Eastern Orthodoxy and sometimes in Anglicanism, although not in the majority of denominations of Protestantism. In some Christian traditions (like the Orthodox tradition), Sophia is the personification of divine wisdom (or an archangel) who takes female form. She is mentioned in the first chapter of the Book of Proverbs. Sophia is identified by some as the wisdom-imparting Holy Spirit of the Christian Trinity, whose names in Hebrew—Ruach and Shekhinah—are both feminine, and whose symbol of the dove was commonly associated in the Ancient Near East with the figure of the Mother Goddess.

In mysticism, Gnosticism, as well as some Hellenistic religions, there is a female spirit or goddess named Sophia who is said to embody wisdom and who is sometimes described as a virgin. In Roman Catholic mysticism, Saint Hildegard celebrated Sophia as a cosmic figure both in her writing and art. Within the Protestant tradition in England, the 17th-century mystic universalist and founder of the Philadelphian Society, Jane Leade wrote copious descriptions of her visions and dialogues with the "Virgin Sophia" who, she said, revealed to her the spiritual workings of the universe. Leade was hugely influenced by the theosophical writings of 16th-century German Christian mystic Jakob Böhme, who also speaks of Sophia in works such as The Way to Christ. Jakob Böhme was very influential to a number of Christian mystics and religious leaders, including George Rapp and the Harmony Society.

==== Latter Day Saint movement ====
The members of most denominations in the Latter Day Saint movement believe in, although they do not directly worship, a Heavenly Mother who is the female counterpart of the Heavenly Father. Together they are referred to as Heavenly Parents. Adherents also believe that all humans, both women and men, have the potential to become gods through a process known as exaltation.

== Neopaganism ==
Most Modern Pagan traditions honour one or more goddesses. While some who follow Wicca believe in a duotheistic belief system, consisting of a single goddess and a single god, who in hieros gamos represent a united whole, others recognise only one or more goddesses.

=== Wicca ===
The lunar Triple Goddess symbol.

In Wicca, "the Goddess" is the most important deity, along with her consort, the Horned God. In many forms of Wicca, the Goddess is considered a universal deity, more in line with her description in the Charge of the Goddess, a key Wiccan text. In this guise, she is the "Queen of Heaven", similar to Isis. She also encompasses and conceives (creates) all life, much like Gaia. Like Isis and certain late Classical conceptions of Selene, she is the summation of all other goddesses, who represent her different names and aspects across cultures. The Goddess is often portrayed with strong lunar symbolism, drawing on various cultures and deities such as Diana, Hecate, and Isis, and is often depicted as the Maiden, Mother, and Crone triad popularised by Robert Graves (see Triple Goddess below). Many depictions of her also draw strongly on Celtic goddesses. Some Wiccans, or Witches, believe there are many goddesses, and in some forms of Wicca, notably Dianic Wicca, they worship the Goddess alone, and the God plays little (or no) part in their worship and ritual. The earliest history of Wiccans or Witches (nature-based religion) appears in cave paintings showing early humans worshipping a feminine nature deity for luck and harvest (BCE). Later, the Celts formed a more formal form of Witches (Wiccans), with the triquetra (maiden, mother, crone), pentagram, etc. They have evolved into today's strong, nature-based, animal-rights-loving, women's-rights religion.

Goddesses or demi-goddesses appear in sets of three in a number of ancient European pagan mythologies; these include the Greek Erinyes (Furies) and Moirai (Fates); the Norse Norns; Brighid and her two sisters, also called Brighid, from Irish or Celtic mythology.

Robert Graves popularised the triad of "Maiden" (or "Virgin"), "Mother" and "Crone", and while this idea did not rest on sound scholarship, his poetic inspiration has held fast. Considerable variation exists in the precise conceptions of these figures, as typically occurs in Neopaganism and, indeed, in pagan religions in general. Some choose to interpret them as three stages in a woman's life, separated by menarche and menopause. Others find this too biologically based and rigid, and prefer a freer interpretation, with the Maiden as birth (independent, self-centered, seeking), the Mother as giving birth (interrelated, compassionate nurturing, creating), and the Crone as death and renewal (holistic, remote, unknowable) — and all three erotic and wise.

== Feminism ==
=== Goddess movement ===
At least since first-wave feminism in the United States, there has been interest in analysing religion to see if and how doctrines and practices treat women unfairly, as in Elizabeth Cady Stanton's The Woman's Bible. Again in second-wave feminism in the U.S., as well as in many European and other countries, religion became the focus of some feminist analysis in Judaism, Christianity, and other religions, and some women turned to ancient goddess religions as an alternative to Abrahamic religions (Womanspirit Rising 1979; Weaving the Visions 1989). Today both women and men continue to be involved in the Goddess movement (Christ 1997). The popularity of organisations such as the Fellowship of Isis attest to the continuing growth of the religion of the Goddess throughout the world.

While much of the attempt at gender equity in mainstream Christianity (Judaism never recognised any gender for God) is aimed at reinterpreting scripture and degenderising language used to name and describe the divine (Ruether, 1984; Plaskow, 1991), there are a growing number of people who identify as Christians or Jews who are trying to integrate goddess imagery into their religions (Kien, 2000; Kidd 1996,"Goddess Christians Yahoo Group").

=== Sacred feminine ===
The term "sacred feminine" was first coined in the 1970s, in New Age popularisations of the Hindu Shakti. Hinduism also worships multitude of goddesses that have their important role and thus in all came to interest for the New Age, feminist, and lesbian feminist movements.

== Metaphorical use ==
The term "goddess" has also been adapted to poetic and secular use as a complimentary description of a non-mythological woman. The OED notes 1579 as the date of the earliest attestation of such figurative use, in Lauretta the diuine Petrarches Goddesse.

Shakespeare had several of his male characters address female characters as goddesses, including Demetrius to Helena in A Midsummer Night's Dream ("O Helen, goddess, nymph, perfect, divine!"), Berowne to Rosaline in Love's Labour's Lost ("A woman I forswore; but I will prove, Thou being a goddess, I forswore not thee"), and Bertram to Diana in All's Well That Ends Well. Pisanio also compares Imogen to a goddess to describe her composure under duress in Cymbeline.

== See also ==
- Anima (Jung)
- Gavari
- Gender of God
- Goddess movement
- Heavenly Mother
- List of goddesses
- Matriarchy
- Mother goddess
- The Myth of Matriarchal Prehistory
- Ochre
- Oshun
- Sophia
- Tree deity
- Venus figurines
- The White Goddess
