= Disa =

Heroine of a Swedish legendary saga

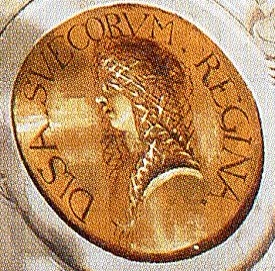
Queen Disa as imagined by Johan Sylvius in the 1680s

Disa is the heroine of a Swedish legendary saga, which was documented by Olaus Magnus, in 1555. It is believed to be from the Middle Ages, but includes Old Norse themes.

It was elaborated by Johannes Messenius in his drama Disa, which was the first historic play in the Swedish language, and was played at the Disting of 1611. It was also presented in an exaggerated version by Olaus Rudbeck in his Atlantica (1685–89)

== Synopsis ==
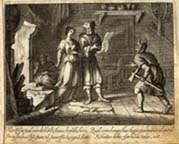
Illustration from Johannes Messenius's play Disa

In a time when the god-king Freyr (or king Sigtrud) ruled in Sweden, there was a famine. The long peace during Freyr's reign had greatly increased Sweden's population until the lands could no longer support it sufficiently.

The king and the chieftains decided that the population had to be culled by killing all the elderly, sickly and handicapped, and by sacrificing them to Odin. Disa, the daughter of the chieftain Sigsten of Venngarn in Uppland, was upset by this cruel solution. She talked mockingly to the king and chieftains about their wisdom and claimed to have wiser words of advice.

In order to test her wits, Freyr asked her to visit him but she could not do so by foot, by horse, in a wagon, nor in a boat. She could not visit him either dressed or undressed. The time must not be within a year nor within a month, and neither during daytime nor nighttime, and neither when the moon was waxing nor waning. (Compare the story of Kráka, who was issued a similar test by her future husband.)

Disa passed the test by harnessing two young men to a sled. By the sled, she had a billygoat and she had one leg over the goat and the other leg in the sled. For clothes she had a net, and she arrived during full moon at dusk to the king on the third day after Yule, all months had 30 days and the last month was to an end and also the year.

The democide was cancelled, and according to the behest of the new queen Disa, there was a drawing of lots so that a part of the population was to leave Sweden (then restricted to Svealand), for the northern regions that were later called Norrland, where they were to settle and cultivate the land.

Disa's wisdom was so highly valued that many disputes were relegated to her at the Midwinter blót at the Temple at Uppsala, which from this time was called the Disablot and the Disting.

== Disa as a source of inspiration ==
The saga has been treated by Johan Celsius in the prose drama Disa (1687), which was an adaptation of Messenius' stage play in verse. Later it was adapted by Johan Gabriel Oxenstierna in the poetic letter Disa (1795), and in the fourth song of the poem Skördarne (1796). In the so-called Disasal on the second floor of Venngarn Castle, there are eight large paintings depicting scenes from Disa's saga. They were previously believed to be works of David Klöcker Ehrenstrahl, but according to August Hahr, they are only the work of artisans based on copies of Ehrenstrahl's compositions, which were published as etchings. One of these etchings was the basis of depictions on tapestry which are partly preserved in the Stockholm Palace and Ulriksdal Palace. Under every painting there are verses providing explanations in Latin and Swedish.

In Pale Fire by Vladimir Nabokov, the last Zemblan King's wife is named Disa, and titled Duchess of Payn.

== Inspiration for name of orchid Genus Disa ==
Botanist Peter Jonas Bergius named the Disa genus of orchids in 1767. It has been suggested that the name may have been based on the Disa legend. The dorsal sepal of some Disa orchids have a net-like appearance reminiscent of the fishnet in which Disa appears before King Freyhr.

== See also ==
- Sitones
