= Early Germanic calendars =

Obsolete Germanic calendars

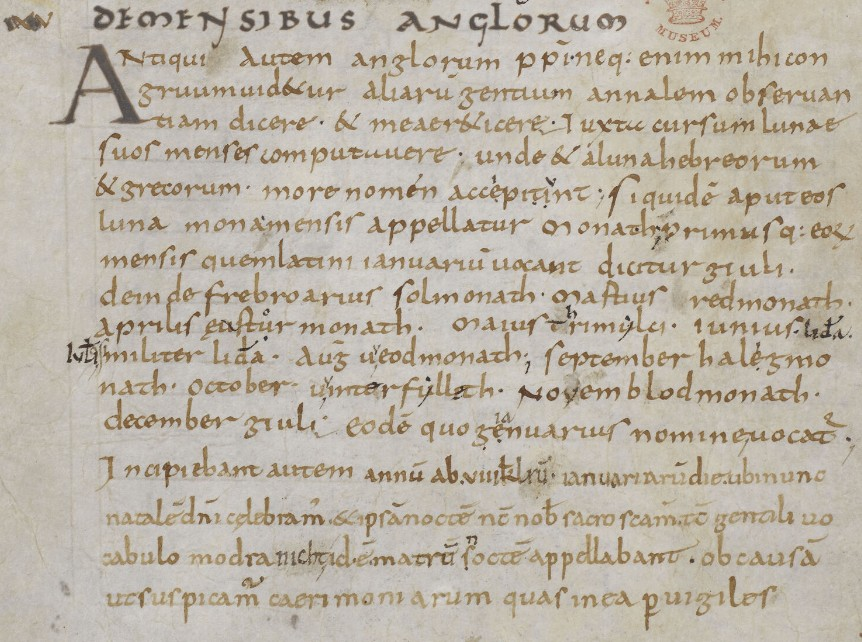
Bede's description of English months in The Reckoning of Time from Cotton MS Vespasian B VI.

The early Germanic calendars were the regional calendars used among the early Germanic peoples before they adopted the Julian calendar in the Early Middle Ages. The calendars were an element of early Germanic culture.

The Germanic peoples had names for the months that varied by region and dialect, but they were later replaced with local adaptations of the Julian month names. Records of Old English and Old High German month names date to the 8th and 9th centuries, respectively. Old Norse month names are attested from the 13th century. As with most pre-modern calendars, the reckoning used in early Germanic culture was likely lunisolar. As an example, the Runic calendar developed in medieval Sweden was lunisolar, fixing the beginning of the year at the first full moon after winter solstice.

== Months ==
The Germanic calendars were lunisolar, the months corresponding to lunations. Tacitus writes in his Germania (Chapter 11) that the Germanic peoples observed the lunar months.

The lunisolar calendar is reflected in the Proto-Germanic term *mēnōþs "month" (Old English mōnaþ, Old Saxon mānuth, Old Norse mánaðr, and Old High German mānod, Gothic mēnōþs), being a derivation of the word for "moon", *mēnô—which shares its ancestry with the Greek mene "moon", men "month", and Latin mensis "month".

== Days and weeks ==
Tacitus gives some indication of how the Germanic peoples of the first century reckoned the days. In contrast to Roman usage, they considered the day to begin at sunset, a system that in the Middle Ages came to be known as the "Florentine reckoning". The same system is also recorded for the Gauls in Caesar's Gallic Wars.

"They assemble, except in the case of a sudden emergency, on certain fixed days, either at new or at full moon; for this they consider the most auspicious season for the transaction of business. Instead of reckoning by days as we do, they reckon by nights, and in this manner fix both their ordinary and their legal appointments. Night they regard as bringing on day."

The concept of the week, on the other hand, was adopted from the Romans, from about the first century, the various Germanic languages having adopted the Greco-Roman system of naming of the days of the week after the classical planets, inserting loan translations for the names of the planets, substituting the names of Germanic gods in a process known as interpretatio germanica.

== Calendar terms ==
The year was divided into a summer half and a winter half, as attested in Old English and medieval Scandinavian sources. In Scandinavia this continued after Christianization; in Norway and Sweden the first day of summer is marked by the Tiburtius Day (14 April) and the first day of winter by the Calixtus Day (14 October).

The month names do not coincide, so it is not possible to postulate names of a Common Germanic stage, except possibly the names of a spring month and a winter month, *austrǭ and *jehwlą. The names of the seasons are Common Germanic, *sumaraz, *harbistaz, *wintruz, and *wazrą for "spring" in north Germanic, but in west Germanic the term *langatīnaz was used. The Common Germanic terms for "day", "month" and "year" were *dagaz, *mēnōþs and *jērą. The latter two continue Proto-Indo-European *mḗh_{1}n̥s, *yóh_{1}r̥, while *dagaz is a Germanic innovation from a root *d^{h}eg^{wh}- meaning "to be hot, to burn".

A number of terms for measuring time can be reconstructed for the proto-Germanic period.

modern English	Proto- Germanic	Old English	English	Scots	West Frisian	Dutch	Low Saxon	German	Old Norse	Icelandic	Faroese	Swedish	Norwegian		Danish	Gothic
Term	Proto- Germanic	Old English	English	Scots	West Frisian	Dutch	Low Saxon	German	Old Norse	Icelandic	Faroese	Swedish	Nynorsk	Bokmål	Danish	Gothic
daytime, 24 hour period	*dagaz	dæġ, dōgor	day	day, dey	dei	dag	Dag	Tag	dagr, dǿgn / dǿgr	dagur	dagur	dag, dygn	dag, døgn/døger	dag, døgn	dag, døgn	𐌳𐌰𐌲𐍃
night time	*nahts	niht	night	nicht	nacht	nacht	Nacht	Nacht	nátt	nótt	nátt	natt	natt	natt	nat	𐌽𐌰𐌷𐍄𐍃
week	*wikǭ	ƿiċe	week	wouk	wike	week	Wekke	Woche	vika	vika	vika	vecka	veke	uke	uge	𐍅𐌹𐌺𐍉
month	*mēnōþs	mōnaþ	month	month	moanne	maand	Mohnd (maond)	Monat	mánaðr	mánuður	mánaður	månad	månad	måned	måned	𐌼𐌴𐌽𐍉𐌸𐍃
year	*jērą	ġēar	year	year, ear	jier	jaar	Johr (jaor)	Jahr	ár	ár	ár	år	år	år	år	𐌾𐌴𐍂
interval / timespan / period	*tīdiz	tīd	tide	tide	tiid	tijd	Tiet	Zeit	tíð	tíð	tíð	tid	tid	tid	tid	*𐍄𐌴𐌹𐌳𐌹𐍃
hour / timespan / period	*tīmô	tīma	time	time					tími	tími	tími	timme	time	time	time	*𐍄𐌴𐌹𐌼𐌰
Spring	*langatīnaz	lencten	Lent	Lentren	linte	lente	Lent	Lenz								*𐌻𐌰𐌲𐌲𐌰𐍄𐌴𐌹𐌽𐍃
Spring	*wazrą-							Frühling	vár	vor	vár	vår	vår	vår	forår (vår)	*𐍅𐌰𐌶𐍂
Summer	*sumaraz	sumor	summer	simmer	simmer	zomer	Sommer	Sommer	sumar	sumar	summar	sommar	sommar / sumar	sommer	sommer	*𐍃𐌿𐌼𐌰𐍂𐍃
Autumn / Fall	*harbistaz	hærfest	harvest	hairst	hjerst	herfst	Harvst	Herbst	haustr	haust	heyst	höst	haust	høst	efterår (høst)	*𐌷𐌰𐍂𐌱𐌹𐍃𐍄𐍃
Winter	*wintruz	ƿinter	winter	winter	winter	winter	Winter	Winter	vintr / vetr	vetur	vetur	vinter	vinter / vetter	vinter	vinter	𐍅𐌹𐌽𐍄𐍂𐌿𐍃

== Month names ==
=== Medieval ===
==== English ====
Bede's Latin work De temporum ratione (The Reckoning of Time), written in 725, describes Old English month names. Bede mentions intercalation, the intercalary month being inserted around midsummer.

The following is an English translation of Bede's Latin text:

"It did not seem [right] to me that I should speak of other nations' observance of the year and yet be silent about my own nation's.

In the old days the English people calculated their months according to the course of the moon. Hence, after the manner of the Greeks and the Romans, [the months] take their names from the Moon, for the Moon is called mona and the month monath.

1. The first month, which the Latins call January, is Ġiuli;
2. February is called Solmonath;
3. March Hrethmonath;
4. April, Eosturmonath;
5. May, Thrimilchi;
6. June, Litha;
7. July [is] also [called] Litha;
8. August, Weodmonath;
9. September, Helegmonath;
10. October, Winterfilleth;
11. November, Blodmonath;
12. December, Ġiuli – the same name by which January is called.

They began the year on the 8th kalends of January [25 December], when we celebrate the birth of the Lord. That very night, which we hold so sacred, they used to call by the heathen word Modranecht, that is, "mother's night", because (we suspect) of the ceremonies they enacted all that night.

Whenever it was a common year, they gave three lunar months to each season. When a year with an embolismic month occurred (that is, one with 13 lunar months – instead of the usual 12) they assigned the extra month to summer, so that three months together bore the name "Litha"; hence they called [the embolismic] year "Thrilithi". It had four summer months, with the usual three for the other seasons.

But originally, they divided the year as a whole into two seasons: summer and winter. They assigned the six months in which the days are longer than the nights to summer, and the other six to winter. Hence they called the month in which the winter season began "Winterfilleth", a name made up from "winter" and "full moon", because winter began on the full Moon of that month.

Nor is it irrelevant if we take the trouble to translate the names of the other months:

1. The [two] months of Giuli derive their name from the day when the Sun turns back [and begins] to increase, because one of [these months] precedes [this day] and the other follows.
2. Solmonath can be called "month of cakes", which they offered to their gods in that month.
3. Hrethmonath is named for their goddess Hretha, to whom they sacrificed at this time.
4. Eosturmonath has a name which is now translated "Paschal month", and which was once called after a goddess of theirs named Eostre, in whose honour feasts were celebrated in that month. Now they designate that Paschal season by her name, calling the joys of the new rite by the time-honoured name of the old observance.
5. Thrimilchi was so called because in that month the cattle were milked three times a day; such at one time, was the fertility of Britain or Germany, from whence the English nation came to Britain.
6. Litha means "gentle" or "navigable", because in both these months the calm breezes are gentle, and they were wont to sail upon the smooth sea.
7. Weodmonath means "month of tares (weeds)", for they are very plentiful then.
8. Helegmonath means "month of sacred rites".
9. Winterfilleth can be called by the invented composite name "winter-full".
10. Blodmonath is "month of immolations", for then the cattle which were to be slaughtered were consecrated to their gods.

Good Jesu, thanks be to thee, who hast turned us away from these vanities and given us [grace] to offer to thee the sacrifice of praise."

==== Other ====
Charlemagne (r. 768–814) recorded agricultural Old High German names for the Julian months. (Note: From Ch. 29, Vita Karoli Magni Mensibus etiam iuxta propriam linguam vocabula imposuit, cum ante id temporis apud Francos partim latine partim barbaris nominibus pronunciarentur. [For months he also imposed terms according to his own language, since before that time among the Franks they were pronounced partly in Latin and partly by barbarian names.]) These month- and seasonal-names remained in use, with regional variants and innovations, until the end of the Middle Ages across German-speaking Europe, and they persisted in popular or dialectal use into the 19th century. (Note: The format and meanings of the Carolingian month names probably also influenced d'Eglantine when he assigned names to the months in the French Republican Calendar.)

The only agreement between the Old English and the Old High German (Carolingian) month names is the naming of April as "Easter month". Both traditions have a "holy month"; however, it is the name of September in the Old English system and of December in the Old High German one.

A separate tradition of month names developed in 10th century Iceland, see #Icelandic calendar.

Julian month	Old English	Old High German
January	Æfterra Gēola "After Yule", or "Second Yule"	Wintarmānōth "Winter month"
February	Sol-mōnaþ ('mud month' (Note: Bede calls it "the month of cakes, which they offered in it to their gods". Perhaps the cakes he mentioned looked like they were made of mud, due to their color and texture. Or the cakes and the mud could be unrelated, with the name "mud month" being literal: It was the month of mud due to wet weather England endures in February.))	Hornung "Horn-shedding (of stags)" (Note: The name Hornung for February, the only name in the list without the "month" suffix, is explained by König (1997) as a collective of horn, taken to refer to the antlers shed by red deer during this time. Older explanations compare the name with Old Frisian horning (Anglo-Saxon hornung-sunu, Old Norse hornungr) meaning "bastard, illegitimate son", taken to imply a meaning of "disinherited" in reference to February being the shortest of months.)
March	Hrēþ-mōnaþ "Month of the Goddess Hrēþ" or "Month of Wildness"	Lentzinmānōth "Spring month"
April	Easter-mōnaþ "Easter Month", "Month of the Goddess Ēostre" or "Month of Dawn"	Ōstarmānōth "Easter month"
May	Þrimilce-mōnaþ "Month of Three Milkings"	Winnemānōth "Pasture month" or "Joy month"
June	Ærra Līþa "Before Midsummer", or "First Summer"	Brāchmānōth "Break (ground) month" or "Plough month"
—	Þrilīþa "Third (Mid)summer" (leap month)	—
July	Æftera Līþa "After Midsummer", "Second Summer"	Hewimānōth "Hay month"
August	Wēod-mōnaþ "Weed month"	Aranmānōth "Ears (of grain) month" or "Harvest month"
September	Hālig-mōnaþ "Holy Month"	Witumānōth "Wood month"
October	Winterfylleth "Winter full moon" (Note: According to Bede, the month aligning with Julian October was named Winterfylleth "because winter began on the first full moon of that month".)	Windumemānōth "Vintage month"
November	Blōt-mōnaþ "Blót Month", "Month of Sacrifice" (Note: This is probably a reference to the regular slaughter of those livestock that were not going to be kept through the winter, at the end of the last pasturing season, when they would begin to need fodder that was saved to feed the rest over the coming winter. So in addition to any religious sacrifice, the slaughter was also practical. Compare with Welsh: Tachwedd = "slaughtering", and Finnish Marraskuu = "Moon of death".)	Herbistmānōth "Harvest month" or "Autumn month"
December	Ærra Gēola "Before Yule", or "First Yule"	Heilagmānōth "Holy month"

=== Modern correspondences ===
The Old High German month names introduced by Charlemagne persisted in regional usage and survive in German dialectal usage. The Latin month names were in predominant use throughout the medieval period, although the Summarium Heinrici, an 11th century pedagogical compendium, in chapter II.15 (De temporibus et mensibus et annis) advocates the use of the German month names rather than the more widespread Latin ones.

In the late medieval to early modern period, dialectal or regional month names were adopted for use in almanacs, and a number of variants or innovations developed, comparable to the tradition of "Indian month names" developed in American Farmers' Almanacs in the early 20th century. Some of the Farmers' Almanacs' "Indian month names" are in fact derived from continental tradition. (Note: Haddock (1992) gave an extensive list of "Indian month names" along with the individual tribal groups they were supposedly associated with, which were later repeated by Long (1998). Haddock supposes that certain "Colonial American" moon names were adopted from Algonquian languages (which were formerly spoken in the territory of New England), while others, for lack of a native-America source are assumed to be based in some European language and culture. For example, the Colonial American names for the May moon, "Milk Moon", "Mother's Moon", "Hare Moon" have no parallels in the supposed native names, so they are presumed European, while the Colonial name for November, "Beaver Moon" is supposedly translated from an Algonquin name.) The Old English month names fell out of use entirely, being revived only in a fictional context in the Shire calendar constructed by J. R. R. Tolkien for use in his The Lord of the Rings.

Julian month	Old High German	Middle High German	Dutch (Note: These archaic or poetic Dutch names are recorded in the 18th century and were used in almanacs during the 19th century.)	West Frisian
January	Wintarmānōth "Winter month"	Hartung ("hard", of the ground), Wintermonat (Note: In Middle High German, any of the months November, December, January and (more rarely) February was also given the name hartmân, hartmânot "hard month".)	louwmaand ("tanning month")	Foarmoanne ("fore month")
February	Hornung "Horn-shedding (of stags)" (Note: The name Hornung for February, the only name in the list without the "month" suffix, is explained by König (1997) as a collective of horn, taken to refer to the antlers shed by red deer during this time. Older explanations compare the name with Old Frisian horning (Anglo-Saxon hornung-sunu, Old Norse hornungr) meaning "bastard, illegitimate son", taken to imply a meaning of "disinherited" in reference to February being the shortest of months.)	Hornung (Note: The month-name Hornung survived in southern German dialects, and in the 19th century was also used officially in Switzerland as a synonym of February.)	sprokkelmaand ("month of gathering"), schrikkelmaand ("bissextile month")	Sellemoanne ("filthy, unclean month")
March	Lentzinmānōth "Spring month"	Lenzing, Lenzmonat ("spring month"), Dörrmonat ("dry month") MHG lenzemânot (Note: Middle High German month-name lenzemânot survived in modern German use only in poetic or archaizing language, e.g. Schiller in a dedication: "Mannheim den 14. des lenzmonats 1785".)	lentemaand ("spring month")	Foarjiersmoanne ("spring month")
April	Ōstarmānōth "Easter month"	Ostermonat ("Easter month") (Note: Middle High German ôstermânôt; occasional modern use in poetic language, Herder in dem blühnden ostermonat, da die erde neu sich kleidet.)	grasmaand ("grass month" ≈ Fr.R.Cal. Prairial)	Gersmoanne ("grass month")
May	Winnemānōth "Pasture month" or "Joy month"	Wonnemonat ("month of joy") (Note: OHG winnimanoth "pasture month", from an old word winni "pasture". The name does not seem to survive into MHG, but is revived in the 16th century (from the Carolingian month list), but etymologized as wunnemânôt "month of joy" (Note: From Faber (1587) mixed Latin / German text:... maius, der may, a frondibus Carolus Magnus den wonnemonat, id est mensem amoenitatis olim nuncupavit Crude translation:... Maius, the May time, from the pages of Charles the Great the wonnemonat, that is, he once called the month of pleasantness) This reinterpreted revived form becomes a popular poetic name of May in modern German.)	wonnemaand ("month of joy"), bloeimaand ("flower month" = Fr.R.Cal. Floréal), Mariamaand ("Mary's month")	Blommemoanne ("bloom month")
June	Brāchmānōth "Break (ground) month" or "Plough month"	Brachmonat, Brachet ("fallow month") (Note: Remains in use 15–16th centuries, brachmonat, brachmon.)	zomermaand ("summer month"), braammaand, wedemaand ("woad month"), wiedemaand ("weed month")	Simmermoanne ("summer month")
July	Hewimānōth "Hay month"	Heumonat, Heuert ("haying month") (Note: Heumonat remained in use in 16th century (Luther: am zehenten tage des heumonds).)	vennemaand ("pasture month"), hooimaand ("hay month")	Heamoanne, haaimoanne ("haying month")
August	Aranmānōth "Ears (of grain) month" or "Harvest month"	Erntemonat, Ernting ("harvest month")	oogstmaand ("harvest month" ≈ Fr.R.Cal. Messidor, (Note: The word oogst "harvest" itself comes from Latin Augustus.) koornmaand ("corn month")	Rispmoanne ("harvest month"), flieëmoanne ("flea month")
September	Witumānōth "Wood month"	Herbstmonat ("autumn month") (Note: MHG herbestmânôt. Herbstmonat "autumn month" remains a productive compound which may refer to any month in autumn (September, October or November). Occasionally numbered as erster, anderer, dritter Herbstmonat. Herbstmond is revived as a name of September in 18th-century almanacs.), Scheiding ("parting")	herfstmaand ("autumn month"), gerstmaand ("barley month"), evenemaand ("oats month")	Hjerstmoanne ("autumn month")
October	Windumemānōth "Vintage month"	Weinmonat, Weinmond ("vintage month"), (Note: MGH winman, wynmanot MLG wijnmaand, survived into early modern use only in very rare Westphalian wynmaent. Weinlesemonat specifically as the translation of the Vendémiaire of the French Republican Calendar.) Herbstmonat, Gilbhart ("yellowing") (Note: Gilbhart is a pseudo-archaic name coined in the early 20th century.)	wijnmaand ("wine month"), Wijnoogstmaand ("vintage month" = Fr.R.Cal. Vendémiaire), zaaimaand ("sowing month")	Wynmoanne ("wine month"), bitemoanne ("sugar beet month")
November	Herbistmānōth "Harvest month" or "Autumn month"	Wintermonat ("winter month"), (Note: Wintermonat is a name for January in Alemannic and Frisian; in MHG more generally any month in winter. As a name of November (the first month of winter) in 12th-century glossaries, and more widely during the 14–18th centuries.) Herbstmonat (Note: MGH wolfmânôt for November or (more rarely) December.), Nebelung ("fogging")	slachtmaand ("slaughter month"), bloedmaand ("blood month"), nevelmaand, mistmaand ("fog month" ≈ Fr.R.Cal. Brumaire), smeermaand ("pork feeding month")	Slachtmoanne ("slaughter month")
December	Heilagmānōth "Holy month"	Julmond ("Yule month"), Christmonat ("Christ month"), Heiligmonat ("holy month")	wintermaand ("winter month"), midwintermaand ("Midwinter month"), sneeuwmaand ("snow month" = Fr.R.Cal. Nivôse), Kerstmismaand ("Christmas month"), Joelmaand ("Yule month"), wolfsmaand ("wolves' month"), donkere maand ("dark month")	Wintermoanne ("winter month"), Joelmoanne ("Yule month")

== Icelandic calendar ==
Today (at UTC+00)
- Thursday, 12 November 2026
- Icelandic: Fimmtudagur, 20 Gormánuður 2026
Other calendars
Akan	Monoyaw
Armenian	25 Trē 1476
Aztec	Tlacaxipehualiztli 1, 8 Ocēlōtl
Babylonian	1 Arakhsamna, 2337 SE
Balinese pawukon	Luang, Pepet, Kajeng, Menala, Pon, Maulu, Wraspati of Landep, Yama, Dadi, Manuh
Bengali	27 Kartik, BS 1433
Chinese	Yang Metal Tiger・Horn Mansion; Fire Horse Year, Month 10, Day 4 (Lidong, 10 days until Xiaoxue)
Common Era	12 November 2026 CE
Coptic	3 Hathor, AM 1743
Egyptian	30 Phamenoth, 2775 NE
Ethiopian	3 H̱edār, 2019 Amätä Məhrät
French Republican	Décade III, Primidi de Brumaire de l'Année 235 de la République
Gregorian	12 November, AD 2026
Hebrew	2 Kislev, AM 5787
Hindu	Jyeṣṭhā・Atigaṇḍa; Solar: 26 Kārtika, 1948 SE; Lunisolar: Tr̥tīyā, Śukla pakṣa of Kārtika, 2083 VE; Rāudra・5127 KY・1,872,891
Islamic	1 Jumada al-thani, AH 1448 (using tabular method)
ISO week date	2026-W46-4
Japanese	4 Kannazuki, Reiwa 8 (Rittō, 10 days until Shōsetsu)
Julian	30 October, AD 2026 (AM 7535)
Julian day	2461357
Korean	4 Dwaejidal, 4359 DE
Maya	13.0.14.1.14; 7 Ceh, 8 Ix
Roman	ante diem III Kalendas Novembres, MMDCCLXXIX AUC
Solar Hijri	21 Aban, SH 1405
Tibetan	3 smin drug, me pho rta 2153 or 1772 or 1000

A special case is the Icelandic calendar, developed in the 10th century. Inspired by the Julian calendar, it introduced a purely solar reckoning with a year, having a fixed number of weeks (52 weeks or 364 days). This necessitated the introduction of "leap weeks" instead of Julian leap days.

The old Icelandic calendar is not in official use anymore, but some Icelandic holidays and annual feasts are still calculated from it. It has 12 months, of 30 days broken down into two groups of six often termed "winter months" and "summer months". The calendar is peculiar in that each month always starts on the same day of the week. This was achieved by having 4 epagomenal days to bring the number of days up to 364, and then adding a sumarauki week in the middle of summer of some years. This was eventually done so as to ensure that the "summer season" begins on the Thursday between 19 and 25 April in the Gregorian calendar (First day of summer). Hence Þorri always starts on a Friday sometime between 8 and 15 January of the Julian calendar, Góa always starts on a Sunday between 7 and 14 February of the Julian calendar.

Skammdegi "Short days"
1	Gormánuður	"slaughter month" or "Gór's month"	mid October – mid November
2	Ýlir	"Yule month"	mid November – mid December
3	Mörsugur	"fat sucking month"	mid December – mid January
4	Þorri	"frozen snow month"	mid January – mid February
5	Góa	"Góa's month"	mid February – mid March
6	Einmánuður	"lone month" or "single month"	mid March – mid April
Náttleysi "Nightless days"
1	Harpa (Note: The first day of Harpa is celebrated as Sumardagurinn fyrsti, the First Day of Summer.)	(goddess?) (Note: Harpa is a female name, probably a forgotten goddess.)	mid April – mid May
2	Skerpla	(goddess?) (Note: Skerpla is also a female name, probably yet another forgotten goddess.)	mid May – mid June
3	Sólmánuður	"sun month"	mid June – mid July
4	Heyannir	"hay working month"	mid July – mid August
5	Tvímánuður	"two month" or "second month"	mid August – mid September
6	Haustmánuður	"autumn month"	mid September – mid October

Many of the months have also been used in Scandinavia, the Norwegian linguist Ivar Aasen wrote down the following months in his dictionary, coming in this order:

Jolemåne Torre Gjø-Kvina

Two of the names are identical to Iceland, and other is similar. They have developed differently in different regions. Þorri is pronounced "tærri", "torre" and similar, and can mean both the moon after Yule-month, or be a name for January or February.

== See also ==
- Ásatrú holidays
- Runic calendar

== External links and references ==
- Northvegr article on dating
- Facts and Figures: The Norse Way General information on old Germanic culture, including time.
- (in German) Old High German dictionary, including month names
- (in German) Old Norse dictionary, including month names
- (in German) Old English dictionary, including month names
- Anglo-Saxon month names
