= Rheda (mythology) =

Anglo-Saxon goddess

In Anglo-Saxon paganism, Rheda (Latinized from Old English, *Hrêðe or *Hrêða, possibly meaning "the famous" or "the victorious") is a goddess connected with the month '"Rhedmonth"' (from Old English *Hrēþmōnaþ). Rheda is attested solely by Bede in his 8th-century work De temporum ratione. While the name of the goddess appears in Bede's Latin as Rheda, it is reconstructed into Old English as *Hrēþe and is variously modernly anglicised as Rhetha or Hretha (also "Hrethe" or "Hrede"). Hrēþmōnaþ is one of three events (apart from the days of the week) that refer to deities in the Anglo-Saxon calendar—the other two being Ēostermōnaþ and Mōdraniht.

== De temporum ratione ==
In chapter 15 of his work De temporum ratione, Bede provides information about English months and celebrations. Bede records that Hrēþmōnaþ is analogous to March, and details that "Hrethmonath is named for their goddess Hretha, to whom they sacrificed at this time" (Rhed-monath a Dea illorum Rheda, cui in illo sacrificabant, nominatur…). Bede notes that Hrēþmōnaþ occurs between Solmōnaþ (February), so named due to the offerings of cakes to the gods during the month, and Ēostermōnaþ (April), named after the goddess Ēostre.

== Theories ==
19th-century scholar Jacob Grimm notes, while no other source mentions the goddesses Rheda and Ēostre, saddling Bede, a "father of the church, who everywhere keeps heathenism at a distance, and tells us less than he knows" with the invention of the goddesses Rheda and Ēostre would be uncritical, and that "there is nothing improbable in them, nay the first of them [Rheda] is justified by clear traces in the vocabularies of the German tribes." Grimm proposes a connection between *Hrēþe and the Old High German female personal name Hruada. Grimm theorizes that the Old High German form of the goddess name Rheda was *Hrouda.

Wilhelm Wachsmuth identifies her with the Continental Germanic earth goddess Nerthus.

Rudolf Simek notes that Grimm's derivation of the name Rheda means that Rheda "could have a similar meaning to the eponymous Roman god of the same month, Mars." David Raoul Wilson comments that while "Bede gives us no clues as to the rituals involved during Rhedmonath and Eosturmonath, it is reasonable to assume that they related to the beginning of spring, the new growing season, and fertility."

== Modern influence ==
Appendix D of J. R. R. Tolkien's The Lord of the Rings contains a presentation of the Shire calendar, the calendar used by the fictional society of Hobbits, based on what is known of the Anglo-Saxon calendar. Its third month is called "Rethe", modelled after Hrēþmōnaþ, projected into a Modern English spelling. In modern Anglo-Saxon Heathenry, Hrēþmōnaþ is sometimes called "Rhethmonth".
