= Winter Nights =

Scandinavian Winter festival and period

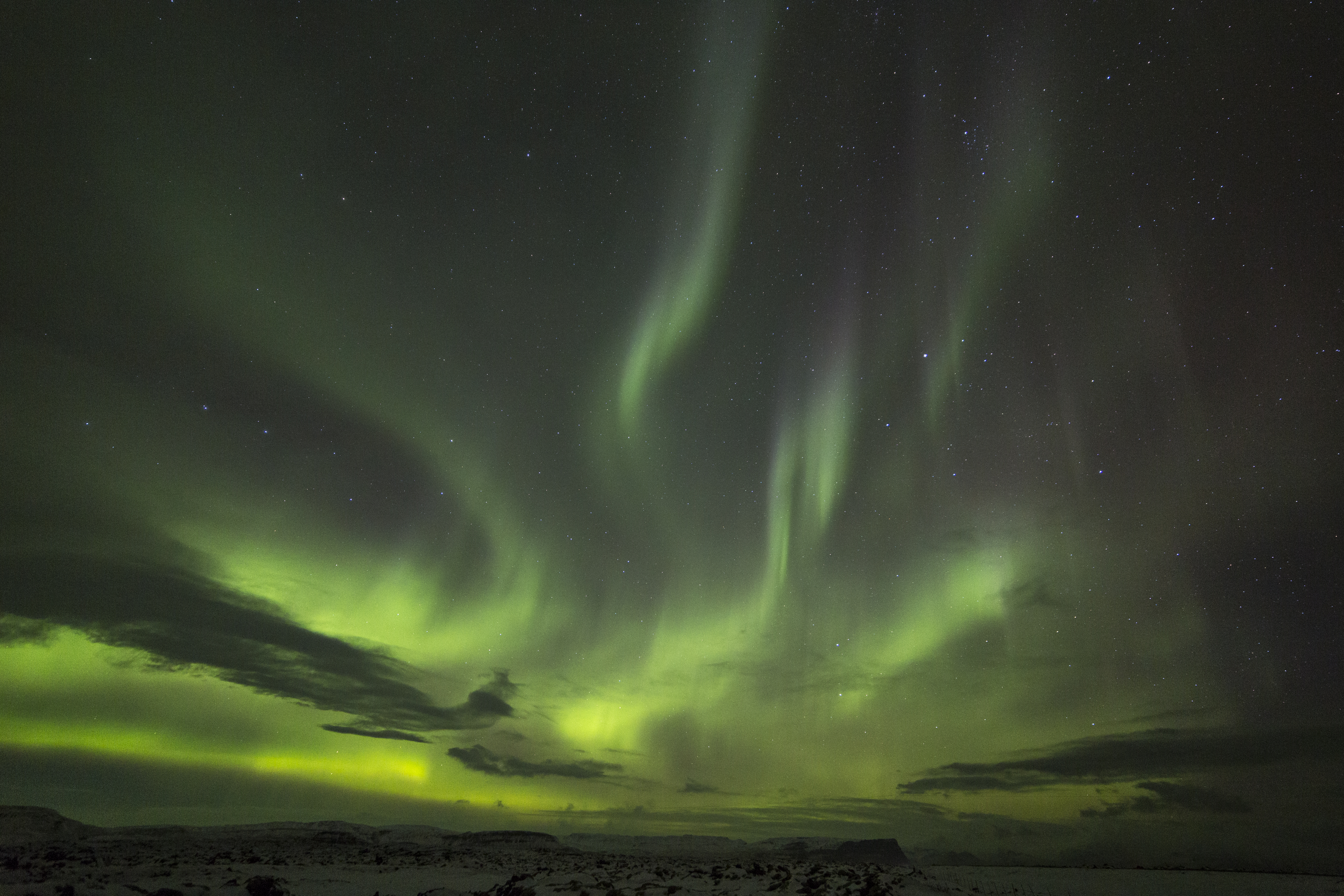
- Northern lights at night in Iceland.
- Observed by: Old Nordic pagans, modern Heathens
- Type: Pagan
- Significance: Winter festival
- Date: Beginning of winter (see § Timing)
- Frequency: Annual
- Related to: All Hallows' Day

The Winter Nights (Old Norse: vetrnætr) are the days beginning the winter season in medieval Scandinavia and modern Heathenry. Before the Christianisation of Scandinavia, it was a festival period, likely lasting three days, marked with blót, drinking, feasting and games. The period sat at the boundary between the summer and winter halves of the year, and possibly also situated at the beginning of the year, leading to it being seen as a time of increased danger from supernatural beings who roamed the landscape. These include the dísir, female beings with close connection to fate, to whom sacrifices known as dísablót were held. It was also seen as a time in which female beings could reveal the future in dreams, often about the dreamer's death.

After Christianisation, ideas of wandering supernatural beings may have influenced traditions of the Wild Hunt and related winter masking traditions such as julebukking. Winter Nights also continued to mark the beginning of winter in Christian Icelandic calendars and early Swedish law codes, particularly those regulating permissible times for hunting. The period is now also celebrated by modern Heathens.

== Etymology and timing ==
Vetrnætr literally translates as "Winter Nights", and may also be written as "winter-nights". Old Norse: Vetr is derived from Proto-Germanic: *wintru- ("winter") and is cognate with Old English and Modern English: winter. Nǫtt (plural: nætr) is derived from Proto-Germanic: *naht- ("night") and is cognate with Old English: niht and Modern English: night. This name originates in the festival's position at end of autumn and the beginning of winter.

The plural form is almost exclusively used, although the singular form ("wintærnat") is found in Västmannalagen. From the plural term is derived vetrnátta-helgr ("the first Sunday in the winter-season") and vetrnátta-skeið ("the season when winter sets in"). That the term is typically used in plural suggests the period lasted several days, with three days being a common interpretation. This is supported by the 13th century Valla-Ljóts saga, which references hinn þriðju veternætur ("the third Winter Night"). Snorri Sturluson similarly describes the heathen midwinter celebrations as lasting three days in Hákonar saga góða.

The heathen festival likely fell around mid- to late-October and may have also coincided with the new moon or full moon, based on the pre-Christian lunisolar calendar. Later Christian traditions in Iceland placed Winter Nights fell three Saturdays after the feast of Cosmas and Damian. This would correspond to 10th-16th October in the Julian calendar, and 21st-27th October after 1700, when the Gregorian calendar was adopted.

== Pre-Christian customs ==
=== Blót, feasting and drinking ===
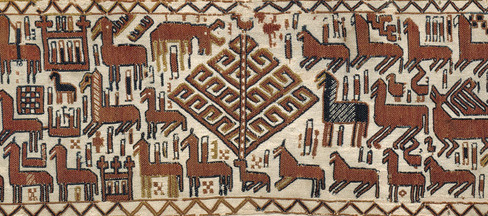
Section of an Överhogdal tapestry, Jamtli

As with other important times of year such as Yule, blót often took place during Winter Nights celebrations, in which animals were sacrificed to the gods and their meat cooked and shared among attendants. This was typically accompanied by ceremonial drinking of ale or mead. Óláfs saga Helga, for example, describes a blót at Winter Nights in which toasts were made to the Æsir, cattle and horses were killed and their blood was used to redden the pedestals that the images of the gods stood on in order to bring about a good harvest. Eyrbyggja saga similarly describes Snorri Goði holding a Winter Nights feast in autumn at his home in Snæfellsnes, which he invited all his friends to and where they drunk lots of ale. In the longer version of Gísla saga, a feast is held by Þorgrímr in north-western Iceland at Winter Nights to welcome winter and to blót to Frey. The shorter version instead references a vetrnáttablót ("Winter-Nights' blót"). The saga further says that there was lots of drink served and the hall decorated for the occasion with tapestries. These tapestries may have depicted mythical scenes, similar to the carvings of stories of Sigurð at Hylestad Stave Church, and may have resembled tapestries such as those from Oseberg, Överhogdal and Skog. Gísli also has a great feast with drinking at his farm at the same time.

=== Games ===
The game Knattleikr is played at Winter Nights in texts such as Gísla saga and Eyrbyggja saga, while Víga-Glúms saga talks more generally of many kinds of sports and games being played.

=== Association with dísir ===
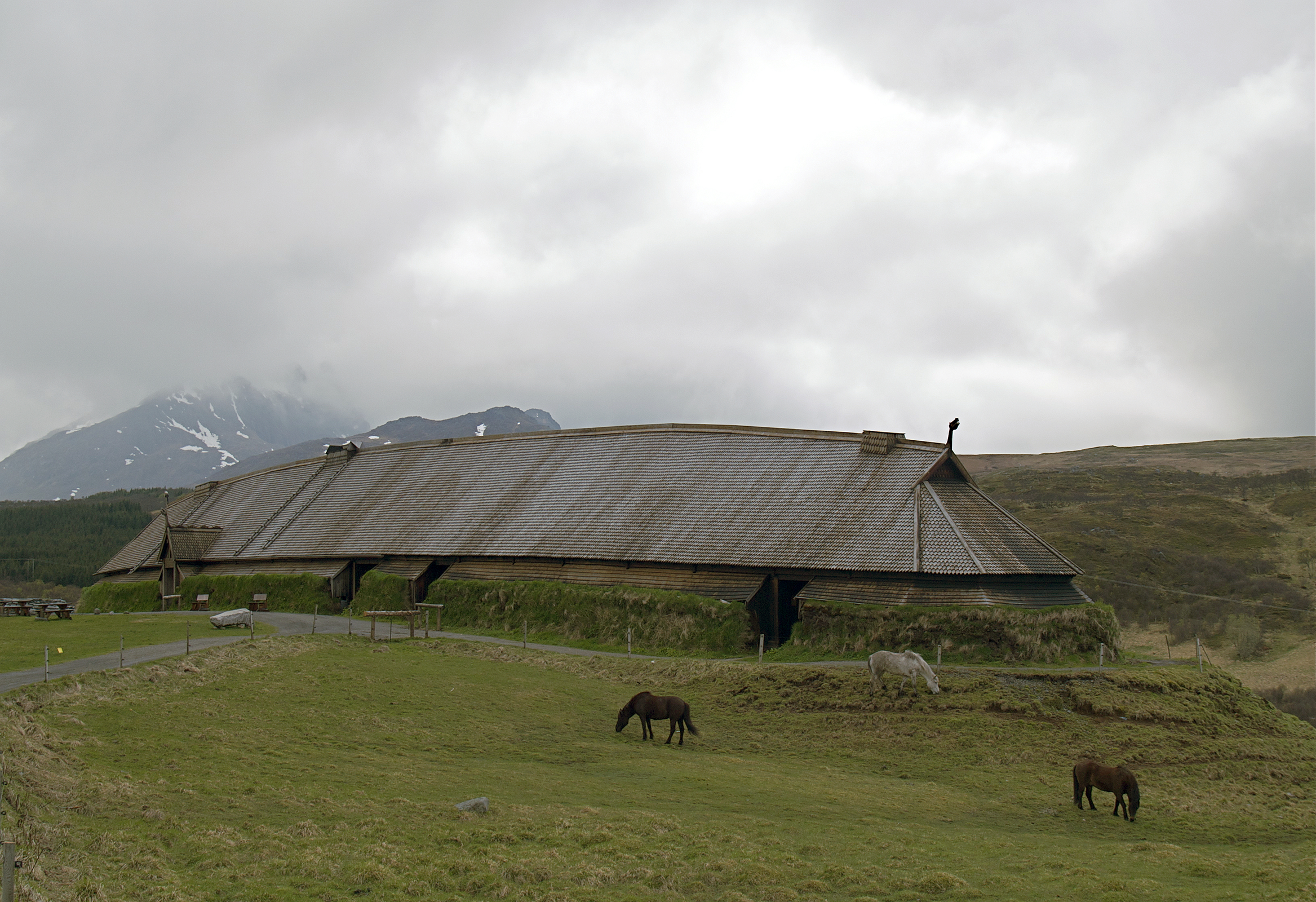
A reconstructed Viking Age hall at the Lofotr Viking Museum in Lofoten, Norway

Some blót taking place at Winter Nights were specifically dedicated to the dísir, female supernatural beings often associated with fate. In Víga-Glúms saga, the dísablót at Voss in Norway coincided with a feast that all were expected to take part in. Þiðranda þáttr ok Þórhalls, found in Flateyjarbók, gives an account in which a special bull is killed in a blót at Winter Nights. That night, when a storm was taking place, nine dísir come riding to the home where the feast had taken place and kill a man named Þiðrandi who had gone outside, despite a spámaðr ("seer") warning him not to. It is later explained in the saga that they took the life of Þiðrandi in place of offerings that they had expected to have been given. The dísablót may have been another name for Winter Nights in some contexts.

This time of year may also have been seen as a time in which female beings could give information about the future, including that those they came to were soon to die. In Gísla saga, for example, Gísli begins having dreams after the Winter Nights' blót that foretell the future, including of two women who tell him his fate. Similarly, a skald gives a verse in Bjarnar saga Hítdælakappa describing how a dís appeared in a dream to him in autumn and told him he would die soon. This likely reflects pre-Christian ideas, closely resembling other women with close connections to deciding or telling the fates of humans. These include the nornir in Vǫluspá, ásynjur pouring blood over a farm in a dream of Víga-Glúm and the völva Þorbjǫrg lítilvǫlva in Eiríks saga rauða.

Sagas such as Vatnsdæla saga and Gunnlaugs saga ormstungu describe weddings taking place around Winter Nights. While this may partly be through the practicality of holding one feast for multiple events, it may also be linked with the prominence of the dísir at this time, who have been suggested to be connected to fertility and could be called upon to help with childbirth.

It has been further argued that winter had a particularly female aspect, in contrast to summer being more male. This would tie in with the role of the dísir at Winter Nights and may stem from people typically spent more time inside in the winter; the home was typically the responsibility of women and was the location of typically female activities such as spinning and weaving.

=== Significance ===
The heathen Scandinavian year was likely split into two seasons, summer and winter, rather than four. Winter Nights would, therefore, mark the beginning of the winter half of the year and possibly the beginning of the natural year. This prominent position that may explain why it is the best attested heathen yearly festival in Old Norse texts. Winter Nights therefore was positioned at a liminal point of transition into the dark, and more dangerous, half of the year. Similar to Yule, this could correspond to an increased threat from supernatural beings, as in Þiðranda þáttur og Þorhalls. This concept and related practices may have influenced modern northern European traditions of supernatural visitations that are common throughout the winter and particularly around Christmas. In these customs, supernatural beings, and humans disguised as them, travel across the landscape causing harm and mischief, including the Wild Hunt and Julebukkane.

== Related customs ==
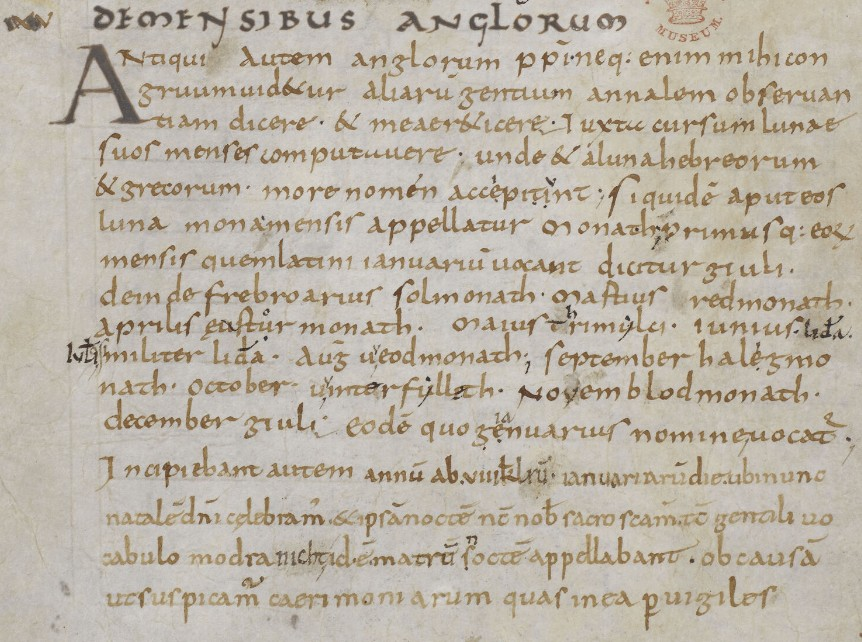
The start of De Mensibus Anglorum in The Reckoning of Time, describing Winterfylleth and Modranecht, Cotton MS Vespasian B VI.

Winter Nights has been compared to the month Winterfylleth in the heathen English calendar recorded by Bede in The Reckoning of Time. As with Winter Nights, Bede writes that the winter half of the year began with this month. Winterfylleth likely began on the first new moon after the autumn equinox, which would place the full moon very near in time to Winter Nights. It has therefore been suggested that both these times of year may have a shared origin in an older calendarical system.

Similarities have been further noted between the dísablót and the English celebration of Modranecht ("Mothers' night"), also recorded in The Reckoning of Time. This festival likely fell between the two months of giuli ("Yule month"), and Bede attributes its name to the ceremonies he believed the heathen English performed then. The mothers are typically interpreted as female gods that are similar to, or the same as, the dísir or the matrones (Latin: mothers) found in Roman sources on Germanic peoples and inscriptions in Roman-influenced Germanic areas.

Austrfaravísur records another heathen autumn festival in western Svetjud at the beginning of the 11th century - the álfablót ("elf-blót"). In the account, the Christian skald Sigvatr Þorðarson and his companions were turned away from one farm where the blót were taking place because it was declared holy (heilgr) there, and another by a housewife out of fear of Óðinn's wrath.

== Christianisation and later traditions ==
Winter Nights celebrations were likely merged with All Hallows Mass or St Michael's Mass during the process of Christianisation, as was the case with other heathen festival periods, such as Yule with Christmas. This is suggested by the Gulaþingslög, which enforces the brewing of ale at All Hallows Mass, which it notes took place after the time of the old Winter Nights, at the start of winter.

In addition to their continued use in Icelandic calendars, the Winter Nights are also used as a time of year in early Swedish law codes, including Dalalagen, which only permits hunting in the winter half of the year, between wintirnætir ("the Winter Nights") and sumar natæ ("the Summer Nights"). In Upplandslagen, however, hunting is allowed after All Hallows' Day. The oldest surviving manuscripts of the law codes date to late 13th and 14th centuries but they likely are based on older laws. Some of these may have been pre-Christian and some, including Upplandslagen, explicitly claim to go back to heathen lawmen.

Winter Nights are celebrated in modern Heathenry, typically around October.

== See also ==
- Samhain, a Gaelic festival taking place at a similar time

== Bibliography ==
=== Primary ===
- Beda (1999). Bede, The Reckoning of Time. Translated by Wallis, Faith. Liverpool University Press. ISBN 978-0-85323-693-1.
- Viga-Glums saga, with the tales of Ögmund Bash and Thorvald Chatterbox. Translated by McKinnell, John. Edinburgh: Canongate. 1987. ISBN 0862410843.

=== Secondary ===
- Gunnell, Terry (2000). "The season of the dísir: the winter nights, and the dísablót in early medieval Scandinavian belief". Cosmos. 16: 117–149.
- Horton, Kristen (1 January 2014). Why Aren't More Heathens Eco-Pagan Vegetarians? The Intersection Of Gender, Politics, And Spiritual Environmentalism. University of Mississippi (Thesis).
- Kroonen, Guus (2013). Etymological Dictionary of Proto-Germanic.
- Magnell, Ola (2019). "Animals of Sacrifice: Animals and the Blót in the Old Norse Sources and Ritual Depositions of Animals of Sacrifice". In Wikström af Edholm, Klas; Rova, Peter Jackson; Nordberg, Andreas; Sundqvist, Olof; Zachrisson, Torun (eds.). Myth, Materiality and Lived Religion. Stockholm University Press. p. 303. doi:10.16993/bay. ISBN 978-91-7635-097-3. S2CID 195459479.
- Nordberg, Andreas (2006). "Jul, disting och förkyrklig tideräkning". Acta Academiae Regiae Gustavi Adolphi. 91. Archived from the original on 14 March 2023.
- Orchard, Andy (1997). Dictionary of Norse Myth and Legend. Cassell. ISBN 0-304-34520-2.
- Pálsson, Kári (2023). Gísla saga Súrssonar: Fact, Fiction of Folklore? (PDF). Háskóla Íslands (Thesis).
- Simek, Rudolf (2007). Dictionary of Northern Mythology. Translated by Angela Hall. D. S. Brewer. ISBN 978-0-85991-513-7.
- Steinbock, Fritz (2014). Das Heilige Fest: Rituale des traditionellen germanischen Heidentums in heutiger Zeit (in German). Edition Roter Drache. p. 134. ISBN 978-3-944180-52-6.
- Strmiska, Michael (17 December 2007). "Putting the Blood Back into Blót: The Revival of Animal Sacrifice in Modern Nordic Paganism". Pomegranate. 9 (2): 154–189. doi:10.1558/pome.v9i2.154.
- Sundqvist, Olof (27 November 2015). "An Arena for Higher Powers: Ceremonial Buildings and Religious Strategies for Rulership in Late Iron Age Scandinavia". An Arena for Higher Powers. Brill. ISBN 978-90-04-30748-3.
- "Old Norse Dictionary - Vetr-nætr". Cleasby & Vigfusson - Old Norse Dictionary.
- "Old Icelandic Dictionary - Álfablót". Old Icelandic Dictionary.
- "Old Icelandic Dictionary - Spámaðr". Old Icelandic Dictionary.
