= Þrimilcemōnaþ =

In the Anglo-Saxon calendar, Þrimilcemōnaþ (modern English: Three-Milkings Month) was the month roughly corresponding to May.

The name was recorded by the Venerable Bede in his work De Temporibus (On Time) in about 703, and was so named because cows could apparently be milked three times in one day during this month. According to Bede:

Se fīfta mōnaþ is nemned on ūre geðeōde Ðrymylce, for ðon sƿylc genihtsumnesƿæs geō on Brytone and eāc on Germania lande, of ðæm Ongla ðeōd com on ðās Breotone, ðæt hī on ðæm mōnðe þriƿa on dæge mylcedon heora neāt.	the fifth month is called Ðrymylce in our language, because before, there was such abundance in Britain and also in Germania, whence the Angle-people came to Britain, would milk their cows thrice a day.

== See also ==
- Germanic calendar
- Anglo-Saxon
- Old English
