= Disting =

Annual market in Sweden

Coordinates: 59.861667°N 17.646944°E

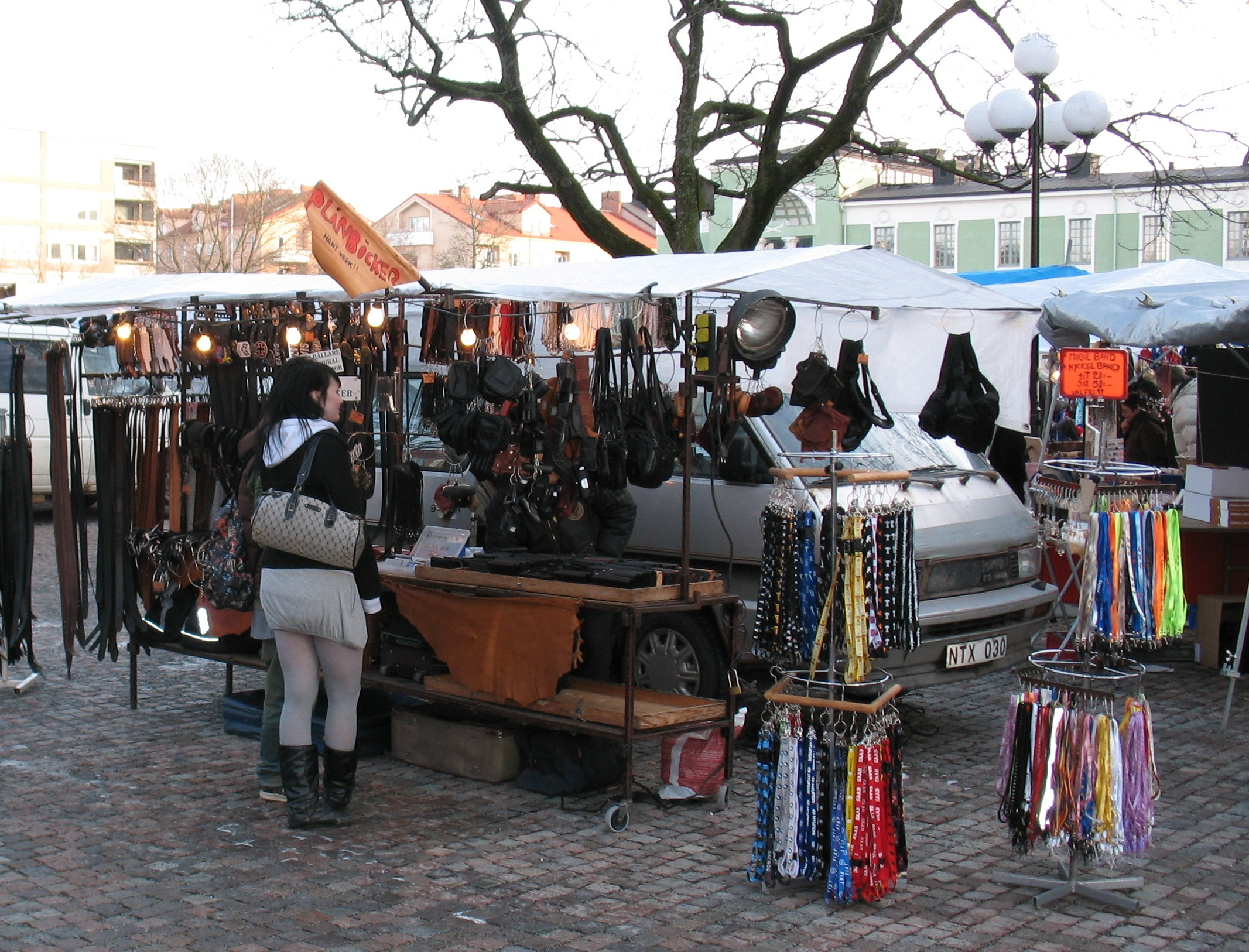
A scene from the disting of 2008

The Disting (Swedish pronunciation: [ˈdɪ̂sːtɪŋ, ˈdîːstɪŋ]) is an annual market which has been held in Uppsala, Sweden, since pre-historic times. The name (Old Swedish: Disæþing or Disaþing) originally referred to the great assembly called the Thing of all Swedes, and it is derived from the fact that both the market and the thing were held in conjunction with the Dísablót, the great blóts (sacrifices) for female powers called dísir (they include the Norns and the Valkyries) at the Temple at Uppsala. They were all originally held at the end of February or in early March.

The Icelandic historian Snorri Sturluson, who was well-informed of Swedish matters and visited the country in 1219, explained in the Heimskringla (1225):

In Svithjod it was the old custom, as long as heathenism prevailed, that the chief sacrifice took place in Goe month at Upsala. Then sacrifice was offered for peace, and victory to the king; and thither came people from all parts of Svithjod. All the Things of the Swedes, also, were held there, and markets, and meetings for buying, which continued for a week: and after Christianity was introduced into Svithjod, the Things and fairs were held there as before. After Christianity had taken root in Svithjod, and the kings would no longer dwell in Upsala, the market-time was moved to Candlemas, and it has since continued so, and it lasts only three days.

In 1611, the first play in the Swedish language named Disa by Johannes Messenius was enacted at the Disting showing a late medieval legend explaining the origins of the Disting, as the pagan origins had been forgotten. Instead of being held in honour of female powers, it was held in honour of a heroic girl who had prevailed on the king and the assembly to stop a great massacre of the weak and elderly to hinder overpopulation.

The market was officially abolished in 1895, but continued informally, and it is still held in early February. It is one of the most traditional Swedish markets.
