= Winterfylleth =

Anglo-Saxon or Old English name for October

Winterfylleth (Ƿinterfylleþ) was the Anglo-Saxon or Old English name for the month of October. It marked and celebrated the beginning of winter.

The name of the month was recorded by Bede thus:

Antiqui Anglorum populi ... annum totum in duo tempora, hiemis et aestatis dispertiebant, sex menses ... aestati tribuendo, sex reliquos hiemi; unde et mensem, quo hiemalia tempora incipiebant, Ƿintirfylliþ appellabant, composito nomine ab hieme et plenilunio, quia videlicet a plenilunio ejusdem mensis hiems sortiretur initium ... Ƿintirfylliþ potest dici compositio novo nomine hiemi plenium.	The old English people split the year into two seasons, summer and winter, placing six months – during which the days are longer than the nights – in summer, and the other six in winter. They called the month when the winter season began Ƿintirfylliþ, a word composed of "winter" and "full moon", because winter began on the first full moon of that month.

== See also ==
- Anglo-Saxon
- Germanic calendar
- Old English
- Winter Nights
