= Johannes Messenius =

Swedish historian (1579–1636)

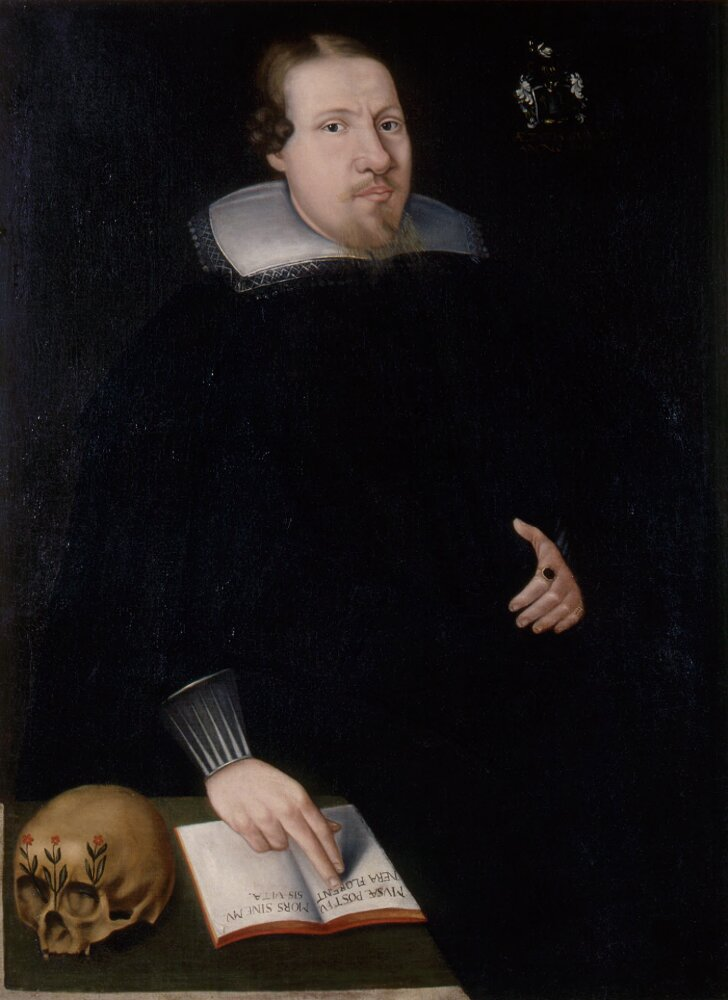
Portrait of Johannes Messenius (1611)

Johannes Messenius (1579–1636) was a Swedish historian, dramatist and university professor. He was born in the village of Freberga, in Stenby parish in Östergötland, and died in Oulu, in modern-day Finland.

== Childhood ==
He was the son of a miller named Jöns Thordsson. At an early age his brilliance caught the attention of a monastery priest named Magnus Andreae, who gave him guidance and taught him. Unbeknownst to the boy's parents, the priest sent him to the Jesuit school in Braunsberg, which was specialized in educating boys for winning Scandinavia back from Protestantism.

== Seeking a position ==
After seven years in Braunsberg, Johannes travelled across Europe. He visited Denmark in 1602, and in 1603, he was a dinner speaker at Bishop Piotr Tylicki in Kraków. He made a short visit in Rome in 1604, but the climate forced him to return to Germany where he possibly won an M.A. in Ingolstadt, in 1605. He is also said to have received the title Poëta cæsarius ("poet of the Emperor") from emperor Rudolph II.

Johannes moved further north to the Jesuit hostel in Danzig, he taught at a school in Braunsberg, and eventually, he opened a private school in Danzig, where he married Lucia Grothusen, the daughter of Arnold Grothusen, the teacher of king Sigismund.

By doing a panegyric work, Genealogia Sigismundi, in 1608, he strove for receiving a better position from the king. When the king did not show the expected gratitude, Johannes returned to Sweden, hoping to reclaim his father's farm Långebro, which had been confiscated by the State.

== Back in Sweden ==
Since Charles IX of Sweden was suspicious towards Catholics and Jesuits, Johannes published a family tree of the kings ancestry, which showed how he was related to the many old dynasties of Europe. Through the intervention of his wife, Johannes received a repatriation permit, and after having given a vow of fealty, he received the position of professor of law and politics at Uppsala University.

== Professorship ==
Johannes began a productive period in his life, which showed considerable learning. In Danzig, in 1605, his brethren among the Jesuits had informed the Swedish King Charles IX that Johannes had written a mocking poem on him. In order to convince everybody of his contempt for the Jesuits, he published two works. One was shorter and named Detecto Fraudis Jesuiticæ, in 1610, and a longer in Swedish named Retorsion och genswars skrifft emoot then lögn och skamlig dicht, which had already been published in German in 1609.

He showed his newly acquired fidelity to the House of Vasa by a new genealogic work and by translating into Latin a number of writings against Sigismund of Poland (King Charles' brother). With fervour, he started to do research and to write on Swedish history, and his source criticism was a forerunner of modern history writing.

In a rapid succession, he published the following works:

- Chronicon episcoporum per Sueciam, etc. (1611)
- Tumbæ veterum ac nuperorum apud Sveones regum, reginarum, ducum etc.
- Sveopentaprotopolis, etc.
- Specula (1612 (published in French, in 1655)
- Retorsio imposturarum (1612)
- Theatrum nobilitalis suecance (1616), which was the first publication of the pedigrees of the Swedish nobility.

Beside this work, he also published older sources for historical studies. He published Ragnvaldus Ingemundi's Latin translation of Magnus Eriksson's Law of the Realm in 1614, Ericus Olai's Swedish chronicle in 1615, the Old Prose Chronicle and the Small Rhyme Chronicle, Adam of Bremen's description of Scandinavia and the beginning of the Large Rhyme Chronicle. It is evident that this large amount of work did not guarantee an even and high quality, but the many editions of his works that were printed testify to their popularity.

As a professor and teacher at the university, he became very popular by his concerns for his students, and by teaching them according to the recent Braunberg methods. He also made plays in the Swedish language a popular activity for young people and he also made dramas himself.

== Conflict ==
However, his hubris, boasting and waywardness caused difficulties with his colleagues at the university, especially since Johannes Rudbeck became his main enemy. The students were finally divided into two factions, one for him, and the other one against him. The Consistory at Uppsala became the battle ground for open fights and antics (partly with Messentius' support) that became so serious that the chancellor Axel Oxenstierna had to intervene.

The two enemies were called to interrogation in Stockholm, in front of the Church council in July 1613. After an investigation, there was a settlement, but both professors were moved from Uppsala. Messenius was entrusted the keeping of the kingdom's old archives, and he was promoted to assessor of the Swedish court of appeal (Svea hovrätt), in 1614.

== Dramatist ==
This was the time, when he began to write his plays, which were to influence Swedish drama during the following century. He almost completely rejected the so-called school drama, to which almost all previous Swedish plays had belonged. Instead, he rather followed the movement of the German Jakob Ayrer.

However, his most successful decision was to write plays on Swedish history, as it was perceived in his time, i.e. including the Fornaldarsagas. His most influential works were:

- Disa (1611, reprinted 7 times (1612–1740)).
- Signill (1612, reprinted 9 times (1612–1740)).
- Swanhuita (1613, reprinted 4 times (1635–1727)).
- Blanckamäreta (1614, reprinted 4 times (1614–1660s), on Blanka of Sweden and Margareta, a Danish princess who married king Birger Magnusson of Sweden.

Encouraged by the success of his first two plays, he declared in the introduction of his third play that he intended to cover all of Sweden's history in 50 comedies and tragedies and make them public. Technically, his works were undeveloped and were a combination of ridiculous scenes with serious ones, and he had a certain feel for the presentation of dramatic effects. According to German tradition, he used people from the lower classes for comedy, but the scenes are usually disconnected from the rest of the play. The main play is organized as a series of dialogues that are loosely joined, and motivation and character depiction are considered to be very primitive. He paid close attention to the rendering of historic clothes, although the limited knowledge of his time showed its limitations in this respect. Occasionally, there are songs in the play, songs that belong to the best he has written, and they have been reprinted as late as 1879.

The works he wrote in prison, Christmannus and Gustavus are less known, and incorrectly attributed to his son. They consist of summaries in dialogue of the history of the church in Sweden. In the spite of its weaknesses, Messenius' dramas are considered to be the most original and most patriotic in Sweden's older literature, and the only part of Swedish literature from this time to have been generally praised.

== Imprisonment ==
In 1616, he was accused of conspiring with king Sigismund and the Jesuits. He was found guilty as charged, when he could not find twelve men who swore that he was innocent. He was sentenced to death in July 1616, but the king changed the sentence to prison, probably for life.

In October 1616, he was transported to the desolate fortress Kajaneborg at Finland near the Russian border, where he was harshly treated by its commander Erik Hara. He occupied himself with writing historical works and by doing research in Swedish source documents. Every once in a while, he sent pleas to king Gustav II Adolph and later to Christina's regency. In these pleas, he swore on his innocence, or referred to his works as reason for pardon. In 1635, he was moved to Oulu, and had his pension doubled. At this time, the government sent him the translator Erik Schroderus, to appraise himself of Messenius' monumental work Scondia illustrata, which treated Sweden's history from the deluge to Messenius' own time. When Messenius suspected that the government wanted to publish the work in its own name, he demanded freedom for his son, Arnold Johan Messenius, who was also imprisoned, and free passage for himself to wherever he wished. These demands offended the regency who threatened to send him back to Kajaneborg.

Shortly, after this, Messenius died, and the government offered his widow 500 riksdaler for Scondia illustrata. However, she left the kingdom with the manuscripts, and it was her son who later returned the text to Sweden in order to have it published. However, it took a long time to publish the work, and it was only thanks to Johan Peringskiöld that it was published in folio 1700–1705.

Considering the scholarly traditions of its time, and the conditions in which it was written, this monumental work can only be described as prominent. More than anyone else of his time, he mastered both Swedish and foreign historical literature. The seventh tome of Scondia, which describes the religious conflicts of John III of Sweden is a model for history writing.

From his time in prison, there are also several other works, which are mostly still extant.
