= Blōtmōnaþ =

Anglo-Saxon calendar month

In the Anglo-Saxon calendar, Blōtmōnaþ (modern English: blōt ‘sacrifice,’ mōnaþ ‘month’) was the month roughly corresponding to November.

The month was recorded by the English scholar Bede in his treatise De temporum ratione (The Reckoning of Time), saying, “Blot-monath is month of immolations, for it was in this month that the cattle which were to be slaughtered were dedicated to the gods."

An entry in the Menologium seu Calendarium Poeticum, an Old English poem about the months, explains:

Se mónaþ is nemned on Léden Novembris, and on úre geþeóde blótmónaþ, forðon úre yldran, ðá hý hǽðene wǽron, on ðam mónþe hý bleóton á, ðæt is, ðæt hý betǽhton and benémdon hyra deófolgyldum ða néat ða ðe hý woldon syllan

— Old English text
Translation:

This month is called Novembris in Latin, and in our language the month of sacrifice, because our forefathers, when they were heathens, always sacrificed in this month, that is, that they took and devoted to their idols the cattle which they wished to offer

— Modern English translation
