= Atete =

Fertility goddess worshipped at Kafa

Atete, in Oromo mythology and religion, is a fertility goddess worshipped at Kafa (Ethiopia).

It is probably the subject of an ancient fertility rite performed by women who collect various sacred plants and throw them into the river.
