= Dísablót =

Sacrificial feast in Germanic paganism

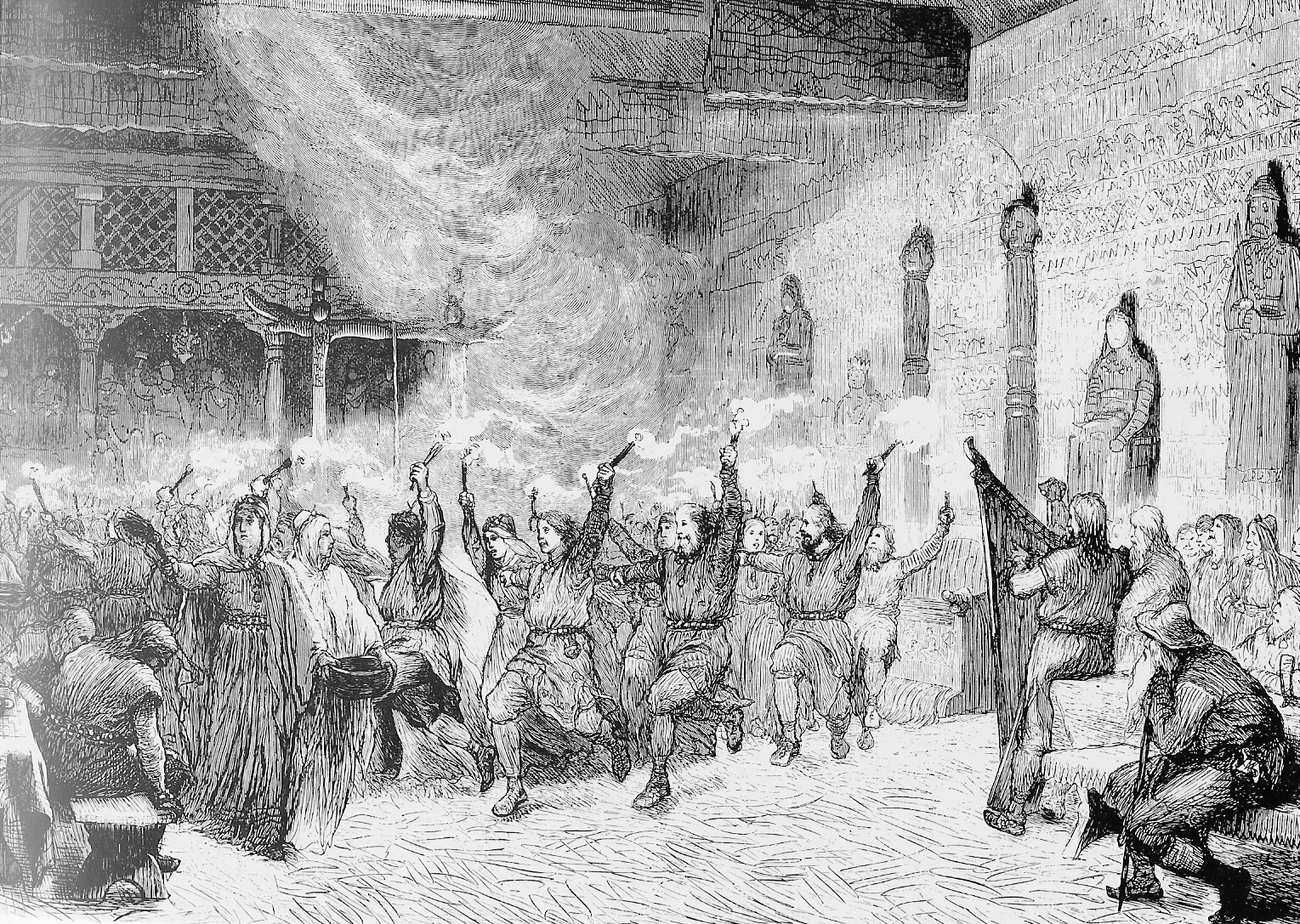
The dísablót by August Malmström.

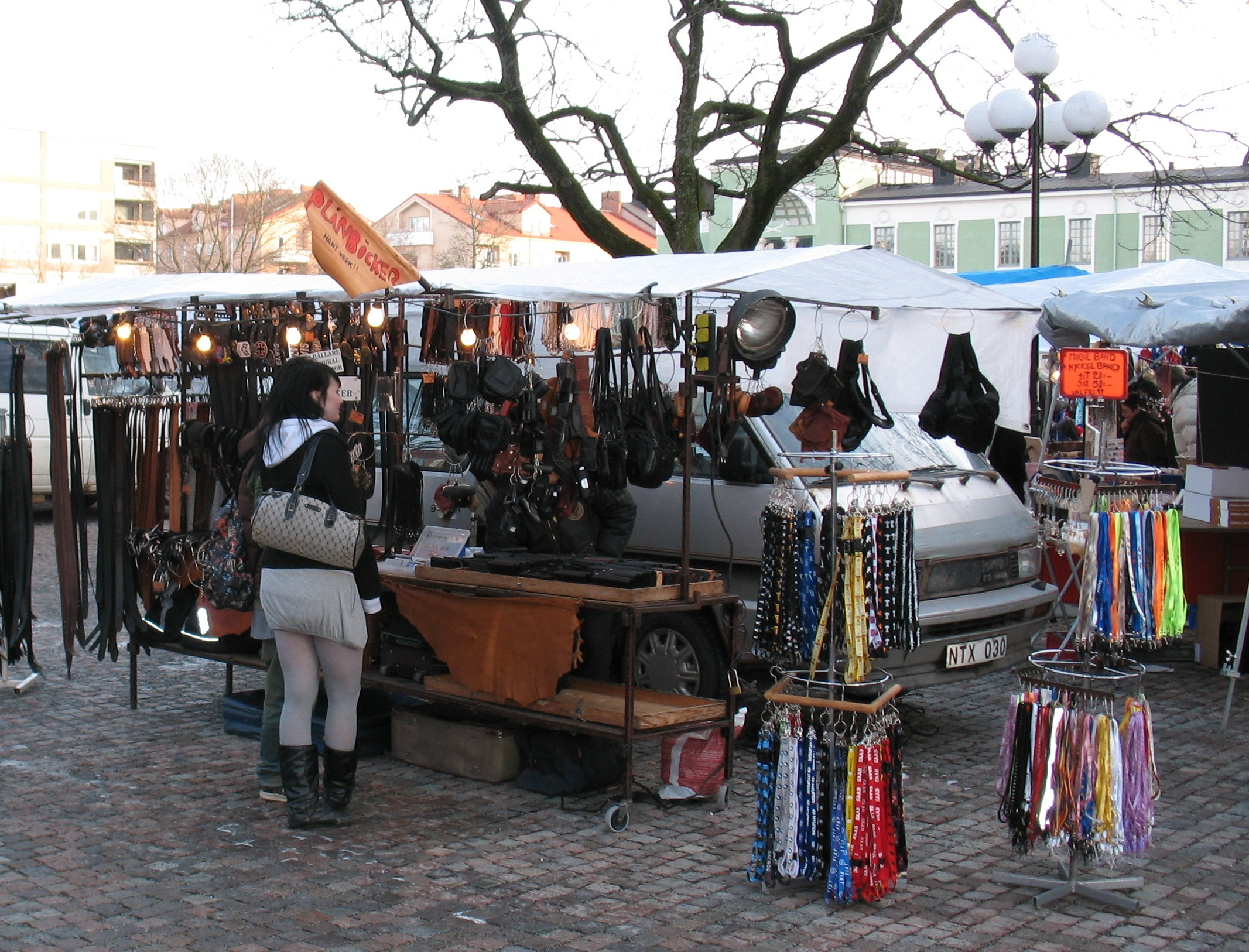
The celebration lives on as an annual market in Uppsala, Sweden. A scene from the disting of 2008.

The Dísablót was the blót (sacrificial holiday) which was held in honour of the female spirits or deities called dísir (and the Valkyries), from pre-historic times until the Christianization of Scandinavia. Its purpose was to enhance the coming harvest. It is mentioned in Hervarar saga, Víga-Glúms saga, Egils saga and the Heimskringla. The celebration still lives on in the form of an annual fair called the Disting in Uppsala, Sweden.

The Dísablót appears to have been held during Winter Nights, or at the vernal equinox. In one version of Hervarar saga, there is a description of how the sacrifice was performed. Alfhildr, the daughter of king Alfr of Alfheim, was kidnapped by Starkad Aludreng while she was reddening a hörgr with blood.

This suggests that the rite was performed by women, especially in light of what is generally believed to be their nearly exclusive role as priestesses of the pagan Germanic religion. However, according to the Ynglinga saga part of the Heimskringla, the king of Sweden performed the rites, which was in accordance with his role as high priest of the Temple at Uppsala. The mention of the Dísablót concerns the death of king Eadgils (Aðils, Adils) who died from falling off his horse while riding around the shrine:

King Adils was at a Disa sacrifice; and as he rode around the Disa hall his horse Raven stumbled and fell, and the king was thrown forward upon his head, and his skull was split, and his brains dashed out against a stone. Adils died at Upsal, and was buried there in a mound. The Swedes called him a great king.

In Sweden, the Dísablót was of central political and social importance. The festivities were held at the end of February or early March at Gamla Uppsala. It was held in conjunction with the great fair Disting and the great popular assembly called the Thing of all Swedes.

The Icelandic historian Snorri Sturlusson, who was well-informed of Swedish matters and visited the country in 1219, explained in the Heimskringla (1225):

In Svithjod it was the old custom, as long as heathenism prevailed, that the chief sacrifice took place in Goe month at Upsala. Then sacrifice was offered for peace, and victory to the king; and thither came people from all parts of Svithjod. All the Things of the Swedes, also, were held there, and markets, and meetings for buying, which continued for a week: and after Christianity was introduced into Svithjod, the Things and fairs were held there as before.

The shrine where the Dísir were worshiped was called dísarsalr and this building is mentioned in the Ynglinga saga concerning king Aðils' death. It also appears Hervarar saga, where a woman becomes so infuriated over the death of her father by the hands of Heiðrekr, her husband, that she hangs herself in the shrine.

The Scandinavian dísablót is associated with the Anglo-Saxon modranect ("mothers' night") by Gabriel Turville-Petre. The Anglo-Saxon month roughly equivalent to November was called blot-monath.

The number of references to the Disir ranging from the Merseburg Charms to many instances in Germanic mythology indicate that they were considered vital deities to worship and that they were primary focus of prayers (e.g. the charms) for luck against enemies in war.

== See also ==
- Tamfana
- Heathen holidays
- Valkyrie
