= Mōdraniht =

Germanic pagan festival

Mōdraniht or Modranicht (pronounced [ˈmoːdrɑniçt]; Old English for "Night of the Mothers" or "Mothers' Night") was an event held on or around the northern hemisphere's longest night of the year (the winter or hibernal solstice), by Anglo-Saxon pagans. The event is solely attested by the medieval English historian Bede in his eighth-century Latin work De temporum ratione. It has been suggested that sacrifices may have occurred during this event. Scholars have proposed connections between the Anglo-Saxon Mōdraniht and events attested among other Germanic peoples (specifically those involving the dísir, collective female ancestral beings, and Yule), and the Germanic Matres and Matronae, female beings attested by way of altar and votive inscriptions, nearly always appearing in trios.

The Norse equivalent to Mōdraniht was hǫkunátt (alternatively hǫggunátt, in Danish: høgenat, Icelandic and Norwegian: hökunótt, Swedish: höknatt). The meaning of the prefix hǫku-/hǫggu- is unknown.

== Attestation ==
In De temporum ratione, Bede writes that the pagan Anglo-Saxons:

Incipiebant autem annum ab octavo Calendarum Januariarum die, ubi nunc natale Domini celebramus. Et ipsam noctem nunc nobis sacrosanctam, tunc gentili vocabulo Modranicht, id est, matrum noctem appellabant: ob causam et suspicamur ceremoniarum, quas in ea pervigiles agebant.

Translation:

... began the year on the 8th calends of January [25 December], when we celebrate the birth of the Lord. That very night, which we hold so sacred, they used to call by the heathen word Modranecht, that is, "mother's night", because (we suspect) of the ceremonies they enacted all that night.

== Theories and interpretations ==
Scholars have linked these Modra ("Mothers") with the Germanic Matres and Matronae. Rudolf Simek says that Mōdraniht "as a Germanic sacrificial festival should be associated with the Matron cult of the West Germanic peoples on the one hand, and to the dísablót and the Disting already known from medieval Scandinavia on the other hand and is chronologically to be seen as a connecting link between these Germanic forms of cult."

Simek provides additional discussion about the connection between Mōdraniht, the dísir, and the norns. Scholars have placed the event as a part of the Germanic winter period of Yule.

Regarding Bede's attestation, Philip A. Shaw commented in 2011 that "the fact that Bede's modranect can be to some extent confirmed by the Romano-Germanic votive inscriptions to matrons does at least indicate that we should not be too quick to dismiss the other evidence he provides for Anglo-Saxon deities".

== See also ==
- Matres and Matronae
- Dea Matrona
- Triple deity
- Dísablót
- Yule
