= Idis =

Idis or IDIS may refer to:

- Idis (Germanic), a female being in Germanic mythology
- IDIS (software), direct data exchange software
- IDIS (technology company), global security and surveillance manufacturer
- Infectious Disease Impact Scale
- International Dismantling Information System
- Interoperable Device Interface Specifications, standards for interoperability for smart meters
