= Idis (Germanic) =

Germanic divine female being

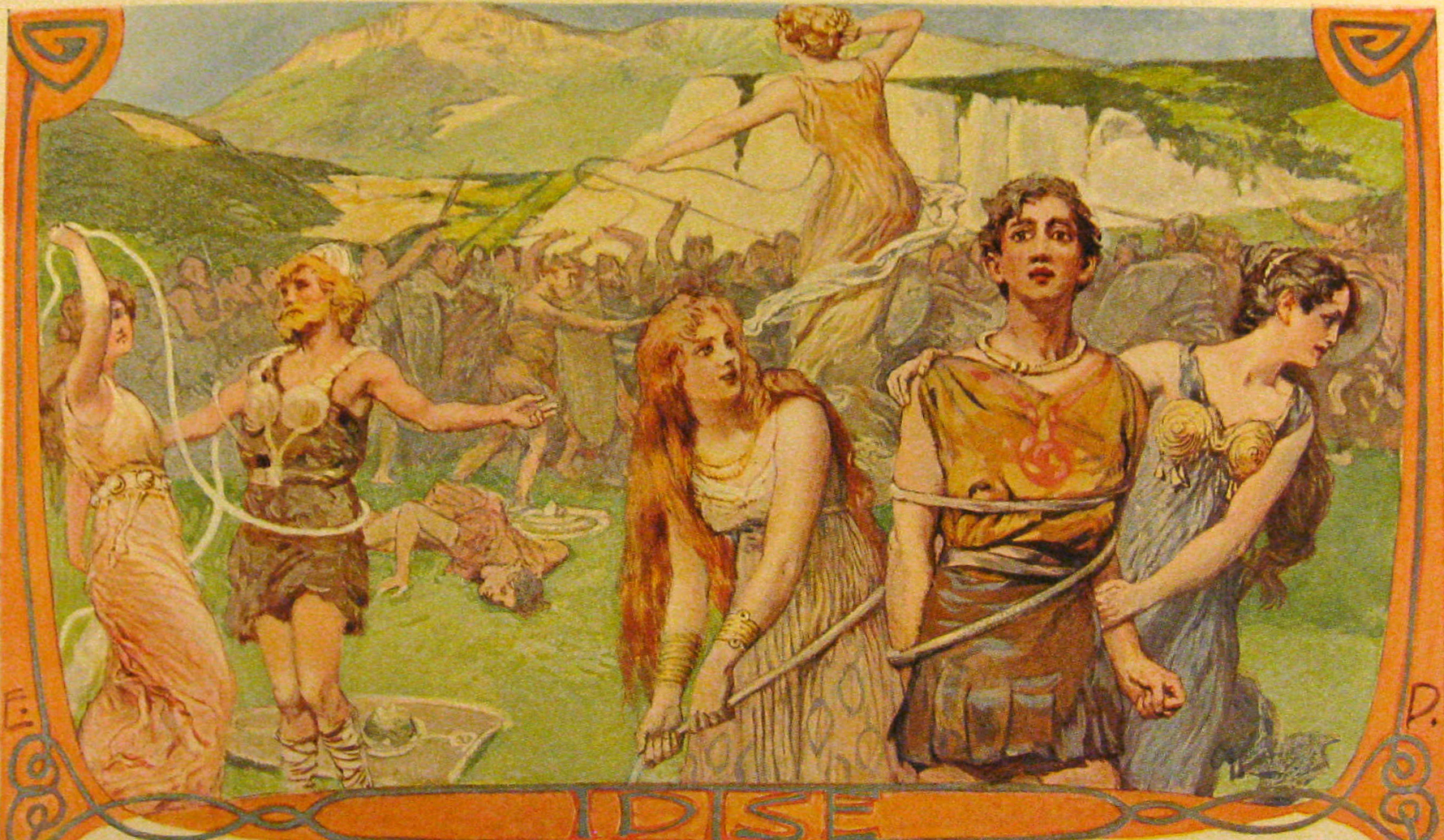
"Idise" (1905) by Emil Doepler.

In Germanic mythology, an idis (Old Saxon, plural idisi) is a divine female being. Idis is cognate to Old High German itis and Old English ides, meaning 'well-respected and dignified woman.' Connections have been assumed or theorized between the idisi and the North Germanic dísir; female beings associated with fate, as well as the amended place name Idistaviso.

== Attestations ==
=== First Merseburg Charm ===
One of the two Old High German Merseburg Incantations call upon female beings—idisi—to bind and hamper an army. The incantation reads:

'Once the Idisi sat, sat here and there,
some bound fetters, some hampered the army,
some untied fetters:
Escape from the fetters, flee from the enemies.'

=== Beowulf ===
In the Old English poem Beowulf, the term ides is used multiple times to describe female beings.

In line 1074 and again in line 1117, the queen Hildeburh is described as an ides while mourning the death of her kin after the Battle of Finnsburg. In line 620, Hrothgar's wife, Wealhtheow is described as the "ides of the Helmings" and again in line 1168 as the "ides of the Scyldings".

In line 1259, the mother of the thurs Grendel is introduced as an ides.

== Theories ==
The idisi mentioned in the first Merseburg Incantation are generally considered to be valkyries. Rudolf Simek says that "these Idisi are obviously a kind of valkyrie, as these also have the power to hamper enemies in Norse mythology" and points to a connection with the valkyrie name Herfjötur (Old Norse "army-fetter"). Hilda Ellis Davidson compares the incantation to the Old English Wið færstice charm, and theorizes a similar role for them both.

Simek says that the West Germanic term Idisi (Old Saxon idis, Old High German itis, Anglo-Saxon ides) refers to a "dignified, well respected woman (married or unmarried), possibly a term for any woman, and therefore glosses exactly Latin matrona" and that a link to the North Germanic term dísir is reasonable to assume, yet that it is not undisputed. In addition, the place name Idisiaviso (meaning "plain of the Idisi") where forces commanded by Arminius fought those commanded by Germanicus at the Battle of the Weser River in 16 CE. Simek points to a connection between name Idisiaviso, the role of the Idisi in one of the two Merseburg Incantations, and valkyries.

"The Dises" (1909) by Dorothy Hardy.

Regarding the dísir, Simek states that Old Norse dís appears commonly as simply a term for 'woman,' just as Old High German itis, Old Saxon idis, and Anglo-Saxon ides, and may have also been used to denote a type of goddess. According to Simek, "several of the Eddic sources might lead us to conclude that the disir were valkyrie-like guardians of the dead, and indeed in Guðrúnarkviða I 19 the valkyries are even called Herjans disir 'Odin's disir'. The disir are explicitly called dead women in Atlamál 28 and a secondary belief that the disir were the souls of dead women (see fylgjur) also underlies the landdísir of Icelandic folklore." Simek says that "as the function of the matrons was also extremely varied – fertility goddess, personal guardians, but also warrior-goddesses – the belief in the dísir, like the belief in the valkyries, norns, and matrons, may be considered to be different manifestations of a belief in a number of female goddesses."

Jacob Grimm proposes a potential connection to the name of the Norse goddess Iðunn and the idisi. Grimm states that "with the original form idis the goddess Idunn may possibly be connected."
