= Icelandic heraldry =

Study of Icelandic coats of arms

- Coat of arms of Iceland (1944-present)
- Heraldic tradition: German-Nordic
- Jurisdiction: Iceland
- Governing body: None

Icelandic heraldry is the study of coats of arms and other insignia used in Iceland. It belongs to the German-Nordic heraldic tradition, as the heraldry of Iceland has been primarily influenced by the heraldic traditions of Norway, Denmark and other Nordic countries. Iceland does not have a strong sense of heraldic tradition, however, because the country lacks a governing body to oversee this. As a result, coats of arms registered as such are virtually nonexistent in modern Iceland. While many municipalities use more or less heraldic logos, there are no heraldic standards to which these must adhere, and they are registered as graphic designs rather than as coats of arms.

== Features ==
Because Iceland lacks a governing body to create policy and guide style, as well as the island nation's relative isolation from mainland Europe, the heraldic forms and styles found in Iceland are often in sharp contrast to those of other European countries. Thus, Icelandic heraldry has several distinguishing features, including the widespread use of vaguely heraldic landscape-type logos for civic bodies, the prominence of fish and maritime symbols (e.g. lighthouses), and the peculiar charge of the stockfish (a headless cod, sometimes flattened). Appropriately for a country whose primary export has always been fish, the stockfish crowned with an open crown was even the country's own heraldic symbol from the 1590s up to the 19th century.

In keeping with the German-Nordic tradition, the tinctures (colours) used in Icelandic heraldry include silver, gold, blue, red, black and green. Notably absent are purple and furs, which are notably rare in other Nordic heraldic traditions. (Note: According to Christopher von Warnstedt's "The Heraldic Provinces of Europe" (1970), furs are rare in Nordic heraldry. This is evident in the rarity of furs in Swedish heraldry, attested by the Swedish Heraldry Society in this article Archived 2010-08-27 at the Wayback Machine (in Swedish), which states that ermine and vair each occur only once in medieval Swedish heraldry, and the peculiarity of fur in Scandinavian heraldry is noted in Volborth (1981), p. 10.)

== History ==
As in other Nordic countries, the use of heraldry started with seals in the 13th century. The earliest known use of the seal in Iceland was that of Hrafn Sveinbjarnarson, who died in 1213. This gold signet ring, bearing a raven (Hrafn in Icelandic), was an early example of canting arms. The ring was a gift from Bjarni Kolbeinsson, Bishop of Orkney.

Reverse of 1974 bronze medal showing the four guardian spirits of Iceland (also the four supporters of Iceland's coat of arms)

Personal coats of arms were rare in medieval Iceland, and these had a distinctive character in comparison to other heraldic traditions, reflective of Iceland's distinctive flora and fauna. After Iceland became part of the Kingdom of Norway in 1262, some Icelandic nobles were granted arms by the king of Norway. Records indicate that two Icelandic knights, Haukur Erlendsson from around the year 1300, and Loftur the rich Guttormsson from around 1400, each bore noble arms featuring a falcon. Three extant letters from the 15th century granted noble arms to Icelanders: in 1450 Torfi Arason was granted the arms, Azure, a bear argent, with a demi-bear argent on the crest; in 1457 Björn Þorleifsson was granted the arms, Azure, a bear argent, with a bear argent on the crest; in 1488 Eggert Eggertsson, a Norwegian whose descendants became Iceland's governors for a while, was granted the arms, Azure, a demi-unicorn argent, with a demi-unicorn argent on the crest. Nobility was abolished in Iceland in 1660, and no one in Iceland today has any rightful claim to an ancient family coat of arms.

Armigerous Icelanders included recipients of the Grand Cross of the Dannebrog and others eligible for this award. Under the modern republic, there is no regulatory body for the registration of arms, and heraldic designs can only be registered as a logo, not as an actual coat of arms. This means one particular graphic version is registered, while stylistically different designs conforming to the same blazon may be unprotected.

The modern coinage of Iceland frequently displays elements of the contemporary national coat of arms, including the shield and/or the four "guardian spirit" supporters. One notable example of a numismatic display of Icelandic heraldry is the 1974 bronze medallic coin pictured above.

== National coat of arms ==
Coat of arms of Iceland 1944-present, as used today

Iceland's national coat of arms is officially described thus:

"A silver cross in a sky-blue field, with a bright red cross inside the silver cross. The arms of the cross shall extend to the rim of the shield on all four sides. The width of the cross shall be 2/9 of the width of the shield, but the red cross half as wide, at 1/9 of the width of the shield. The upper sections shall be squares and the lower sections the same width as the upper sections, but one-third longer. The shield bearers are the four guardian spirits of Iceland as described in Heimskringla: A bull on the right side of the shield; a giant, on the left; a bird on the right above the bull; and a dragon on the left, above the giant. The shield rests on a plate of columnar basalt."

The first national coat of arms of Iceland that can be attested in contemporary sources depicts a red lion upon a field of gold in the upper third and bars of silver and blue in the lower two-thirds (pictured below, first from left). Based upon this peculiar field, which is thought to be exceptional in placing the uppermost silver bar directly against the gold field, the heraldic advisory committee of Denmark in the 1950s hypothesised that the design must have taken into account an earlier coat of arms representing Iceland, that most likely consisted simply of twelve alternating bars of silver and blue. This design of twelve alternating silver and blue stripes may have been the emblem bestowed upon Gissur Þorvaldsson by King Hákon IV of Norway in Bergen in 1258, when he made him Earl of Iceland. At some point in the 16th century, a crowned stockfish came to be the heraldic representation of Iceland, though the origins of this design are lost to the ages. Its first use that can be attested without controversy is in a silver seal showing the crowned stockfish with the date 1593 and the inscription SIGILLVM INSVLÆ ISLANDIÆ ("seal of the island of Iceland"), which is now kept in the National Museum of Iceland. The crowned stockfish remained the symbol of Iceland until the 20th century, when it was supplanted by an image of a gyrfalcon on a field of blue. By royal decree of the king of Denmark in 1903, the coat of arms of Iceland was changed to "a white Icelandic gyrfalcon on a blue field," and in 1921 this design became the emblem of the newly established Order of the Falcon.

The gyrfalcon did not endure long as Iceland's coat of arms, however, and on February 12, 1919 a new coat of arms was adopted, described by royal decree: "The Icelandic coat of arms shall be a crowned shield charged with the flag of Iceland. The bearers of the shield are the country’s four familiar guardian spirits: a dragon, a vulture, a bull and a giant." These four landvættir ("guardian spirits") had been described by Snorri Sturluson in his 13th-century saga Heimskringla. When Iceland reestablished its independence and reinstated the republic in 1944, recommendations for changes to the coat of arms were discussed; the crown had to be removed, as Iceland was no longer under a monarchy, and other possible changes, including reinstating the gyrfalcon, were discussed. In the end, major modifications were unanimously rejected and the crown was removed, the four supporters redrawn, and the compartment redrawn as a slab of columnar basalt. The newly redrawn version was officially adopted in 1944 by decree of Iceland's newly elected president, Sveinn Björnsson.

First attested arms of Iceland, c. 13th–16th centuries, in a modern interpretation

Arms of Iceland c. 16th century-1903, in a modern interpretation

Arms of Iceland 1903-1919, in a modern interpretation

Arms of Iceland 1919-1944

== Municipal arms ==
Since the modern republic of Iceland lacks a governing body to regulate the registration of heraldic arms, there is no heraldic armory registered as such other than the national arms, which were adopted by presidential decree upon gaining independence in 1944. Rather than actual coats of arms, municipalities carry logos which usually look vaguely like a coat of arms, but the rules of heraldry are not always observed and the results vary, ranging from such characteristically heraldic arms as those of Akureyri to such unheraldic logos as that of Djupivogur.

Reykjavík

== See also ==
- Coat of arms of Iceland
- Flag of Iceland
- Landvættir
