= Dís =

Ghost, spirit, or deity in Norse mythology

"The Dises" (1909) by Dorothy Hardy

In Norse mythology, a dís (Old Norse: [ˈdiːs], "lady", plural dísir [ˈdiːsez̠]) is a female deity, ghost, or spirit associated with Fate who can be either benevolent or antagonistic toward mortals. Dísir may act as protective spirits of Norse clans. It is possible that their original function was that of fertility goddesses who were the object of both private and official worship called dísablót, and their veneration may derive from the worship of the spirits of the dead. The dísir, like the valkyries, Norns, and vættir, are always referred collectively in surviving references. The North Germanic dísir and West Germanic Idisi are believed by some scholars to be related due to linguistic and mythological similarities, but the direct evidence of Anglo-Saxon and Continental German mythology is limited. The dísir play roles in Norse texts that resemble those of fylgjur, valkyries, and norns, so that some have suggested that dísir is a broad term including the other beings.

== Etymology and meaning ==
The dying Viking hero Ragnar Lodbrok exclaimed in Krákumál: "the dísir invite me home (to Valhalla)". This is an illustration of a woman welcoming Odin back to Valhalla on the Tjängvide image stone, Gotland.

Researchers suggest that the basic meaning of the word dís is "goddess".

It usually is said to be derived from the Indo-European root *dhēi-, "to suck, suckle" and a form dhīśana.

Scholars have associated the Dísir with the West Germanic Idisi, seeing the initial i- as having been lost early in Old or Proto-Norse. Jacob Grimm points out that dís Skjöldunga in the Eddic Helgakviða Hundingsbana II (v. 52) is exactly parallel to ides Scildinga "Scylding queen" in Beowulf (l. 1168). He also suggests that Iðunn may be a reflex of the original form of the word. However, except for the First Merseburg Charm, in which they work battle-magic, idis only occurs with the meaning "lady", sometimes "maiden." The words are not presumed to be directly related by some scholars, although the resemblance evidently led to influence on Old Norse poetic use.

Other scholars group all female deities and spirits associated with battle under the class of idis, dis, valkyrie, and other names, such as sigewif (victory-women, associated by the Anglo-Saxons with a swarm of bees), and find the commonalities both linguistically and in surviving myths and magic charms sufficient cause to group together all variations on this theme from various Germanic cultures.

Stories from these and other cultures survive from earlier dates than the Eddas and it is difficult to conclusively construct a clear pre-Christian mythology without conjecture. However, the Germanic languages appear to have had a northward, rather than southward, progression from the initial contact with the speakers of Indo-European languages near Denmark or Jutland. H. Davidson notes a similar northward progression of mythology where elements of Proto-Germanic concepts have metamorphosed or been combined by the time of the initial recording of the Icelandic sagas.

According to Rudolf Simek, Old Norse dís appears commonly as simply a term for 'woman', just as Old High German itis, Old Saxon idis, and Anglo-Saxon ides. It also may have been used to denote a type of goddess. According to Simek, "several of the Eddic sources might lead us to conclude that the disir were valkyrie-like guardians of the dead, and, indeed, in Guðrúnarkviða I 19 the valkyries are even called Herjans disir 'Odin's disir'. The disir are explicitly called dead women in Atlamál 28. A secondary belief that the disir were the souls of dead women (see fylgjur) also underlies the landdísir of Icelandic folklore."

Simek says that "as the function of the matrons was also extremely varied – fertility goddess, personal guardians, but also warrior-goddesses – the belief in the dísir, like the belief in the valkyries, norns, and matrons, may be considered to be different manifestations of a belief in a number of female (half-?) goddesses."

== Dísablót ==
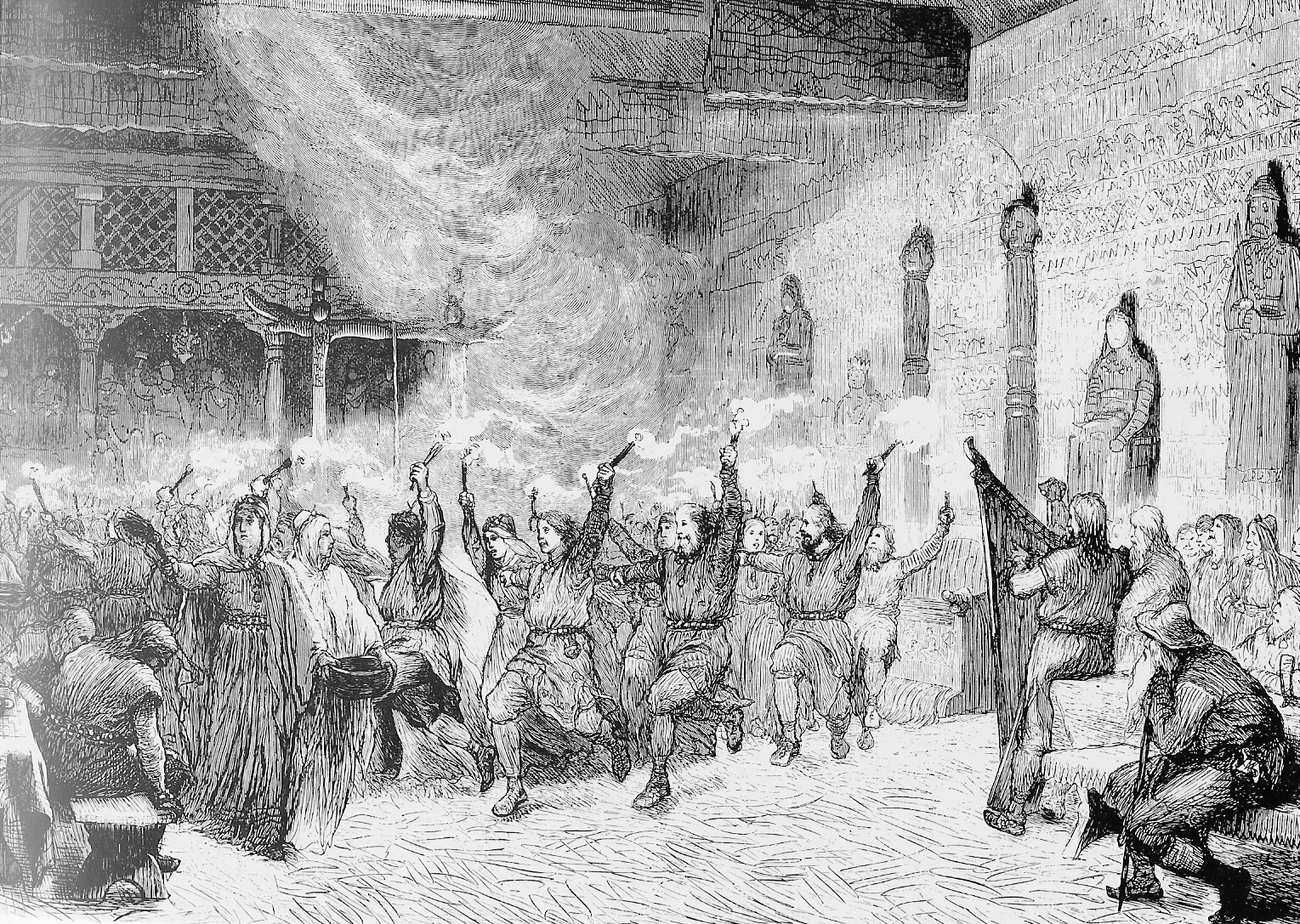
The dísablót by August Malmström

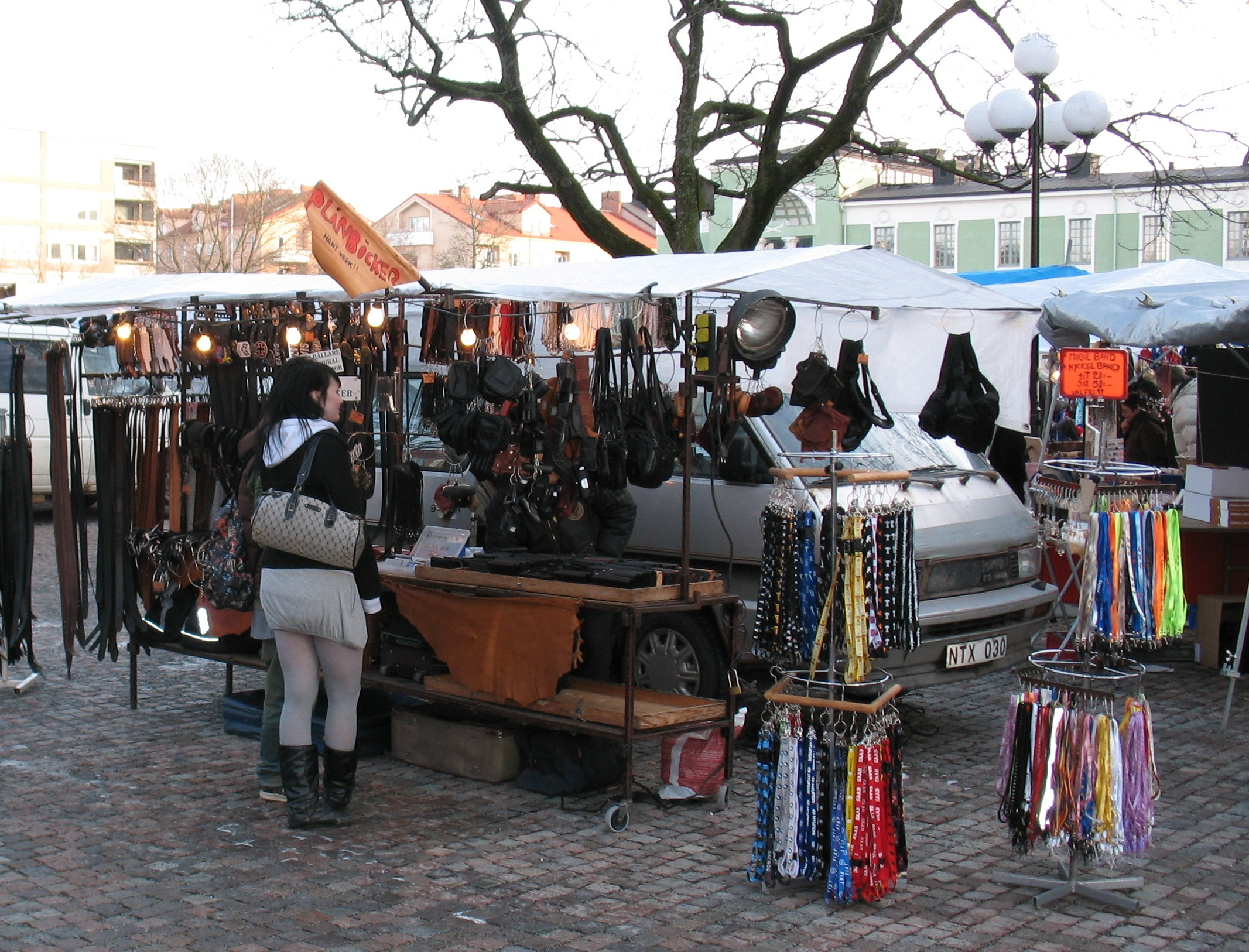
The annual Disting Fair still carries the name of the dísir. A scene from the Disting of 2008.

There is considerable evidence that the dísir were worshipped in Scandinavia in pagan times. Firstly, a sacrificial festival (blót) honouring them, the dísablót, is mentioned in one version of Hervarar saga ok Heiðreks konungs and in Víga-Glúms saga, Egils saga, and the Heimskringla. According to Víga-Glúms saga it was held at Winter Nights (at the onset of winter).

In Hervarar saga, the dísablót is also held in autumn, and is performed by a woman, the daughter of King Álfr of Álfheim, who "reddens the hörgr with sacrifices and is subsequently rescued by the god Thor after she has been abducted. John Lindow suggests that, on its face the text depicts a mythological model for human behavior. In western Scandinavia, dísablót appears to have been a private observance. Even the large gathering in Víga-Glúms saga was for family and friends.

In contrast, according to the Saga of St. Olaf in Heimskringla, at Gamla Uppsala the dísablót was celebrated during the month of Gói, i.e. in late February or early March, and accompanied by a popular assembly known as the Thing of all Swedes or Dísaþing and a yearly fair. When Christianity arrived, the assembly and market were moved to a Christian feast at the beginning of February:

At the time when heathendom still prevailed in Sweden, it was an old custom there that the main sacrifices were held in Uppsala in the month of Gói... Sacrifices were to be made at that time for peace and victory for the king, and people from all over Sweden were to resort there. At that place and time also was to be the assembly of all Swedes, and there was also a market and a fair which lasted a week. Now when Christianity was introduced, the general assembly and the market were still held there. But at present, when Christianity is general in Sweden and the kings have ceased residing at Uppsala, the market has been shifted to meet at Candlemas... but now it lasts only three days. The general assembly of the Swedes is there.

The name Dísaþing (now Disting) remained in use, however, and the Fair is still held every year in Uppsala on the first Tuesday in February. It may be one of the oldest in Sweden.

The stated purpose of the dísablót at Uppsala is to sacrifice for peace and victory. Norwegian places called Disin, from Old Norse Dísavin, "meadow of the dísir", and the possible relationship of the word to the Indian dhīsanas have suggested to some scholars that the dísir were fertility deities.

There are two mentions of a hall or temple of a dís. Hollander translates dísarsálr as "the hall of the goddess". In the Ynglinga saga part of Heimskringla, Aðils, the king of Sweden, dies when he rides one of his horses around the dísarsálr at the time of Dísablót and he is thrown and brains himself on a rock, perhaps suggesting a ritual killing. It also appears in Hervarar saga where Helga becomes so infuriated over the death of her father at the hands of Heiðrekr, her husband, that she hangs herself in the shrine.

Although Snorri Sturluson does not mention the dísir in the Prose Edda, he does list Vanadís—'dís of the Vanir'— as a name for Freyja, and öndurdís—'snow-shoe dís'—as a name for Skaði. He notes that in both cases the compound using dís immediately follows one using goð, 'deity': Vanagoð, öndurgoð. Lotte Motz suggested that dís was the original Old Norse word for 'goddess' and that it had been replaced later by ásynja, which is simply the feminine of áss.

== Relationship to other female figures ==
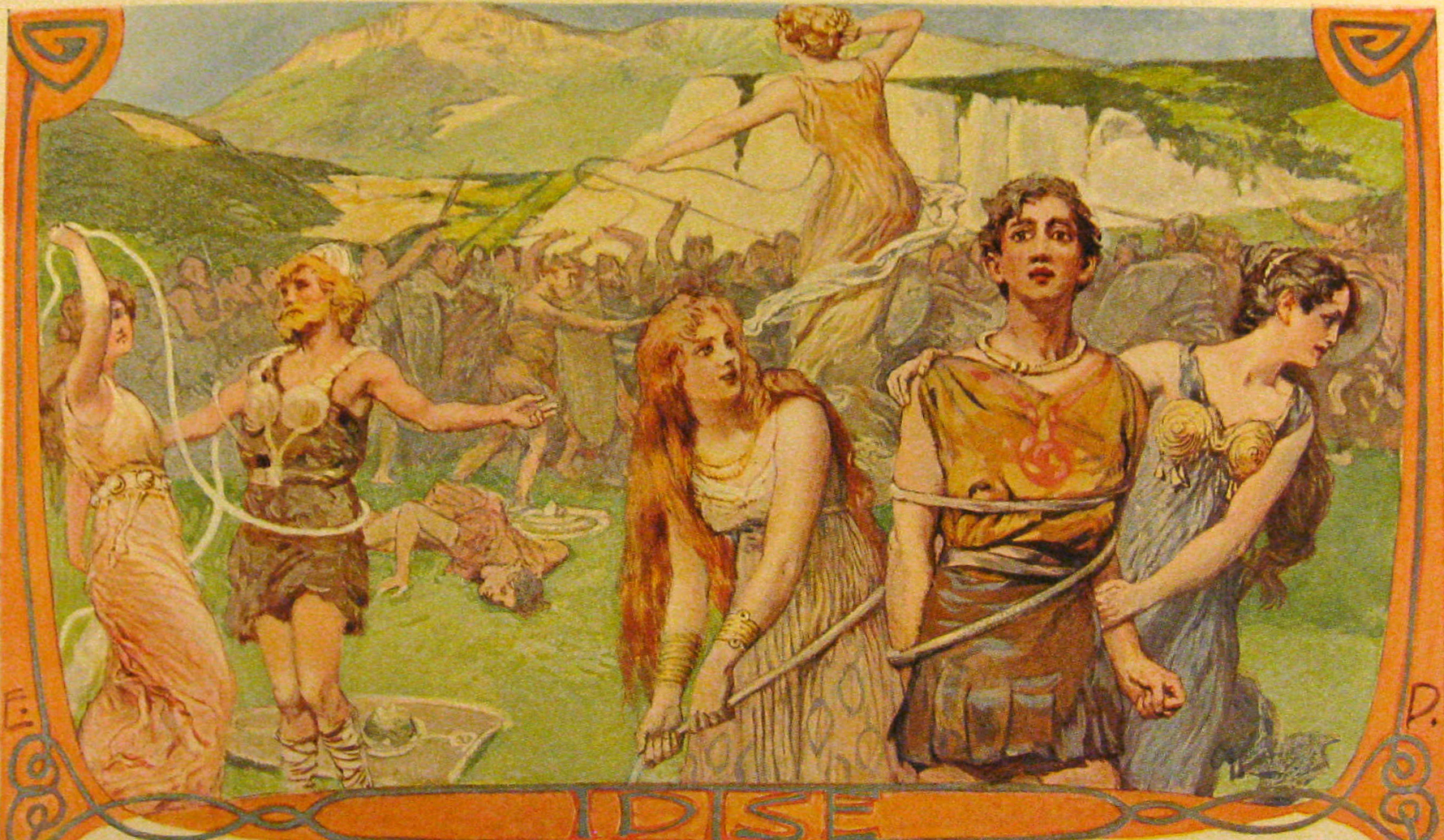
"Idise" (1905) by Emil Doepler

In many texts, the dísir are equated to or seem to play the same role as other female figures.

In Þiðranda þáttr ok Þórhalls, the youth Þiðrandi is killed by dísir dressed in black, riding black horses, while a troop of dísir dressed in white and riding white horses are unable to save him. The two groups represent the struggle between heathenry and Christianity. The benevolent dísir here play the role of tutelary spirits associated with a family, and Thorhall the Prophet explains them as fylgjur. The dísir are also referred to as if they are, or include, protective fylgjur in an exchange of verses in Hálfs saga ok Hálfsrekka. Útsteinn quarrels with Úlfr at the court of King Eysteinn of Denmark, saying he believes "our dísir" have come with him, armed, to Denmark. Úlfr replies that he thinks all the dísir of Útsteinn and his men are dead and their luck run out.

In Helgakviða Hundingsbana I, when the hero Helgi Hundingsbane first meets the valkyrie Sigrún, the poet calls her a "dís of the south". Henry Adams Bellows rendered this simply "the southern maid".

The dísir are also equated with or play the role of norns. They give an impression of great age, but by the time of the oldest surviving texts, their significance had become blurred and the word had lost almost all distinct meaning.

Accordingly, some scholars have argued that dísir may be the original term for the valkyries (lit. "choosers of the slain"), which in turn would be a kenning for dís. Unlike the mentions of the valkyrja and norn, the term dís never appears in the Prose Edda by Snorri Sturluson.

As stated above, dís has been regarded as cognate with Old High German itis, Old Saxon idis and the Anglo-Saxon ides, all meaning "lady",; and idisi appears as the name of the valkyries in the only surviving pagan source from Germany, the Merseburg Incantations (see below). Dís also had the meaning "lady" in Old Norse poetry, as in the case of Freyja, whose name means "lady" (frawjō) and who is called Vanadís ("lady of the vanir").

Adding to the ambiguous meaning of dís is the fact that just as supernatural women were called dísir in the sense "ladies", mortal women were frequently called by names for supernatural women, as noted by Snorri Sturluson in Skáldskaparmál:

Woman is also metaphorically called by the names of the Ásynjur or the Valkyrs or Norns or women of supernatural kind.

The name dís appears in several place names in Norway and Sweden. Moreover, it was a common element in the names of girls, as evidenced on runestones, and it still is in Iceland.

The word appears as a first element in Old High German female given names such as Itispuruc and Itislant. More frequent are Old Norse given names such as Thórdís, Hjördís, Ásdís, Vigdís, Halldís, Freydís.

== Old Norse sources ==
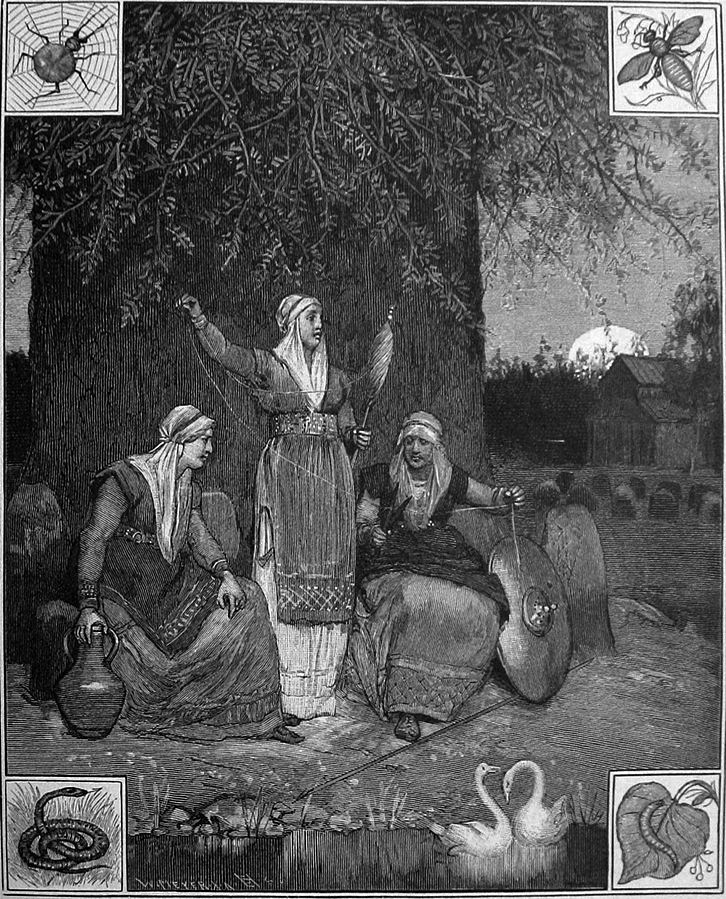
The Norns spin the threads of Fate at the foot of Yggdrasil, the tree of the world.

In a couple of Eddic and skaldic poems, and in various kennings the generic dísir appears instead of the more specific labels norns, fylgjas, and valkyries.

The eddic poem Hamðismál deals with how Hamðir and Sörli go to the Gothic king Ermanaric to exact vengeance for the cruel death of their half-sister Svanhild. On the way, they kill their reluctant brother Erpr. Later, knowing that he is about to die at the hands of the Goths, Sörli talks of the cruelty of the dísir who incited him to kill Erpr, because he would have cut off the head of Ermanaric and made their expedition successful. In this poem, dísir appears as a synonym of norns and the translator Henry Adams Bellows simply translates dísir as norns:

Hamðir kvað: 28. "Af væri nú höfuð, ef Erpr lifði, bróðir okkarr inn böðfrækni, er vit á braut vágum, verr inn vígfrækni, hvöttumk at dísir, -; gumi inn gunnhelgi, gerðumk at vígi -."; - Sörli kvað: 29. "Ekki hygg ek okkr; vera ulfa dæmi, at vit mynim sjalfir of sakask sem grey norna, þá er gráðug eru í auðn of alin.	Hamther spake: 28. "His head were now off; if Erp were living, The brother so keen whom we killed on our road, The warrior noble,-- 'twas the Norns [dísir] that drove me The hero to slay who in fight should be holy. - -: 29. "In fashion of wolves; it befits us not Amongst ourselves to strive, Like the hounds of the Norns, that nourished were In greed mid wastes so grim.

In Grímnismál, the wise Grímnir (Odin) predicts king Geirröðr's death, which he attributes to the wrath of the dísir. Again, dísir is used as a synonym for the norns:

Eggmóðan val nú mun Yggr hafa, þitt veit ek líf of liðit; úfar ro dísir, nú knáttu Óðin sjá, nálgastu mik ef þú megir.	The fallen by the sword Ygg shall now have; thy life is now run out: Wroth with thee are the dísir: Odin thou now shalt see: draw near to me if thou canst.

In Reginsmál, the unmarried Lyngheiðr is called dís ulfhuguð (dís/lady with the soul of a wolf) as an insult. Later in the same poem, there is a stanza, where the dísir appear as female spirits accompanying a warrior in order to see him dead in battle, a role where they are synonymous with valkyries:

Þat er fár mikit ef þú fœti drepr, þars þú at vígi veðr, tálar dísir, standa þér á tvær hliðar ok vilja þik sáran sjá.	Foul is the sign if thy foot shall stumble As thou goest forth to fight; Goddesses [dísir] baneful at both thy sides Will that wounds thou shalt get.

An additional instance where dís is synonymous with valkyrie is the skaldic poem Krákumál – composed by Ragnarr Loðbrók while awaiting his death in a snake pit. It features the line: Heim bjóða mér dísir (the dísir invite me home), as one of several poetic circumscriptions for what awaits him.

One source seems to describe the Dísir as the ghosts or spirits of dead women. In Atlamál, believed to have been written in Greenland in the twelfth century, the character Glaumvör warns her husband Gunnar that she had a dream about the Dísir. Some of the surrounding text has been lost and it is not known what Gunnar may have said prior to this, and there is disagreement on which stanza number this should be given. A possible translation of the material is given as follows by John Lindow in his 2001 book Norse Mythology:

"I thought dead women
came hither into the hall,
not poorly decked out.
They wished to choose you,
would've invited you quickly
to their benches;
I declare of no value
these dísir to you."

== See also ==
- Disa
- Grendel's mother
- Hamingja
- Landdísir

== General and cited references ==
- Simek, Rudolf (2007) translated by Angela Hall. Dictionary of Northern Mythology. D.S. Brewer ISBN 0-85991-513-1
