= Park Young-ok =

South Korean investor (born 1961)

Park Young-ok (Korean: 박영옥; born April 28, 1961) is a South Korean investor. Known as Stock Farmer, he is the chairman and CEO of Smart Income Group.

== Early life and education ==
Park Young-ok grew up in a small village in Jangsu, North Jeolla Province, South Korea. From a young age, he helped his family farming in the countryside. His nickname of Stock Farmer was influenced by his work as a farmer, feeling joy when all the time he had invested came into fruition.

Young-ok went to Chung-Ang University on a full scholarship. He graduated in 1982 with a Bachelor in Business Administration. He then acquired a Master of Finance Management at the Graduate School of International Business Administration.

== Career ==
After serving as fund manager for Hyundai Investment Research Institute, Daishin Securities and International Investment Advisory, Park became head of Kyobo Securities' Apgujeong branch in 1997.

Following 9/11, Park became a full-time investor. Using some of his own money and some that he had borrowed from friends, he invested 3 billion won in plummeting companies, which recovered after six months. He established his own company, Smart Income, in 2005.: he made some of his best investment returns during the 2008 and 2013 financial crises.

Park has been a professor at Chung-Ang University Graduate School of Industrial Start-up Management since 2013. In 2015, he became Director of Youth Future Network, as well as Co-representative of Unification and Sharing. In 2018, he became Associate President of the Korea Tax Association. Park also sits on the board of the Asia Journalists Association.

=== Philosophy ===
His philosophy is similar to how farmers grow crops, choosing varieties that are resistant to "pests" and have high yields.

Park's initial stock of 45 million won in 1998 was increased by 5,000 times. As of 2022, he owns more than 200 billion won in stocks in public record. Park's favored sector to accompany is agriculture

=== Holdings ===
Park only invests in Korean companies, as an act of patriotism. He has accompanied the growth of Korean companies such as Nongshim, Hotel Shilla, Daedong Industrial and Kangwon Land.

As of 2022, Park is a major shareholder of 5 to 10 IPOs, including Samsung Electronics, POSCO Holdings, Amore Pacific, Hankook, Korea Economic TV, IDIS Holdings, Alton Sports, and National Treasure Design.

== Personal life ==
Park lives with his wife and has three children, including art collector and curator Su Park, who also serves as International Acquisitions Director at Smart Income Inc.

== Published books ==
Park has published a number of books.

- 2021 : 주식투자의 절대원칙 (The absolute principles of stock investment)
- 2018 : 돈일하게 하라 (Let your money work)
- 2015 : 주식회사의 약속 (The promise of a stock company)
- 2015 : 주식, 농부처럼 투자하라 (Stocks: invest like a farmer)
- 2014 : 얘야, 너는 기업의 주인이다 (You're the owner of the company, kiddo)
- 2013 : 주식투자자의 시선 (The investor's viewpoint)

== Awards ==
- 2017: Dong-A Ilbo's Trust and Responsibility Division of CEO Enterprises in Korea's Economy
- 2016: Monthly CEO Social Responsibility Management Division to Shine Korea's Future
- 2015: The Future Management Division of the Creative Management Awards in Korea
- 2015: CEO Ethics to Shine Korea's Future
