= Herfjötur =

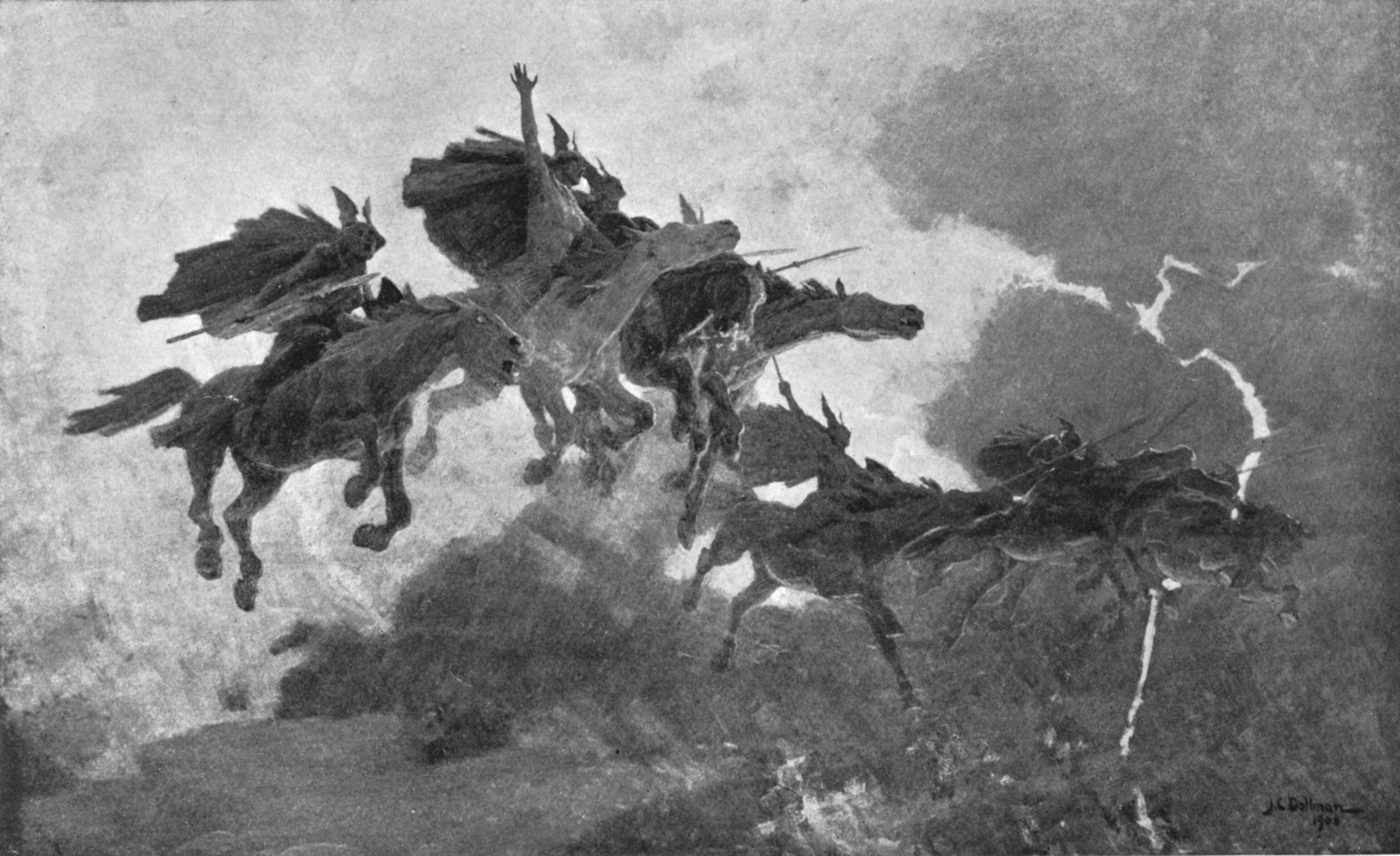
"The Ride of the Valkyrs" (1909) by John Charles Dollman.

In Norse mythology, Herfjötur (Old Norse: Herfjǫtur, "war-fetter", "host-fetter" or "fetter of the army") is a valkyrie. Herfjötur is attested as among the 13 valkyries listed in the Poetic Edda poem Grímnismál, and in the longer of the two Nafnaþulur lists found in the Prose Edda.

Rudolf Simek says the name is kenning-like and that the name likely refers to the "fortune determining function of the valkyries especially in battle." Simek points to a connection between the name and the idisi mentioned in one of the two Merseburg Incantations and says that "these Idisi are obviously a kind of valkyrie, as these also have the power to hamper enemies in Norse mythology."
