= Idistaviso =

Idistaviso is the location on the Weser river where forces commanded by Arminius fought those commanded by Germanicus at the Battle of the Weser River in 16 CE, attested in chapter 16 of Tacitus' Annales II. The name was amended by Karl Müllenhoff and Jacob Grimm in the 19th century to Idisiaviso, meaning "plain of the Idisi" or "women's meadow".

== Theories ==
Rudolf Simek states that "as the Idisi are supposed to have an influence in the outcome of a battle, similarities with the valkyries suggest themselves. Idisiaviso would thus be a place at which the Idisi had once been instrumental in a battle."

Several etymologies of Iðavöllr (a location in Norse mythology) have been proposed, and the meaning of the name is considered unclear. If Iðavöllr is emended to *Ið[is]avöllr, the location name corresponds precisely to Idisiaviso.
