= Coat of arms of Iceland =

Versions
- Escutcheon-only
- Armiger: Iceland
- Adopted: 1 July 1944
- Shield: Azure, a cross Argent, charged with a cross Gules
- Supporters: dexter a bull proper, above it a vulture wings elevated and addorsed proper; sinister a mountain giant vested Argent, belted and shod proper, holding in his sinister hand a staff, above him, a dragon proper.
- Compartment: a plate of columnar basalt

Coat of arms of the president of Iceland
- Armiger: President of Iceland
- Adopted: 8 July 1944

The coat of arms of Iceland displays a silver-edged, red cross on blue shield, alluding to the design of the flag of Iceland. It is the only national arms to feature four supporters: the four protectors of Iceland (landvættir) as described in Heimskringla, standing on a block of columnar basalt. The bull (Griðungur) is the protector of northwestern Iceland, the eagle or griffin (Gammur) protects northeastern Iceland, the dragon (Dreki) protects the southeastern part, and the rock-giant (Bergrisi) is the protector of southwestern Iceland. Great respect was given to these creatures of Iceland, so much that there was a law during the time of the Vikings that no ship should bear grimacing symbols (most often dragonheads on the bow of the ship) when approaching Iceland. This was so the protectors would not be provoked unnecessarily.

The landvættir also decorate the obverse (front) of the Icelandic króna coins, but animals of the ocean (fish, crabs, and dolphins) appear on the reverse (back). The Icelandic presidency uses a swallowtailed Icelandic state flag with a square panel bearing coat of arms. The National Commissioner of the Icelandic Police uses a white flag with the coat of arms, when the use of the state flag is not warranted, and some other state services do as well.

== Official description ==
The government of Iceland describes the coat of arms as follows:

Iceland's coat of arms is a silver cross in a sky-blue field, with a bright red cross inside the silver cross. The arms of the cross shall extend to the rim of the shield on all four sides. The width of the cross shall be 2/9 of the width of the shield, but the red cross half as wide, at 1/9 of the width of the shield. The upper sections shall be squares and the lower sections the same width as the upper sections, but 1/3 longer.

The shield bearers are the four guardian spirits of Iceland as described in Heimskringla [by Snorri Sturluson, 13th century]: A bull on the right side of the shield; a giant, on the left; a vulture on the right above the bull; and a dragon on the left, above the giant.

The shield rests on a plate of columnar basalt.

== History ==
Iceland has historically had various distinct coats of arms:

- The first one is believed to have been a shield with six blue stripes and six silver stripes, possibly signifying the 12 þings of the Icelandic Commonwealth.
- The second one is believed to be the one that was given to Earl Gissur Þorvaldsson by the King of Norway, Hákon Hákonarson, in 1258. It was patterned on the King's own coat of arms, exchanging the colours of the shield with the colour of the lion and adding the blue and silver stripes of the previous coat of arms.
- Circa 1500, the Icelandic coat of arms became a crowned stockfish (a beheaded and eviscerated codfish that is spread open to be dried) on a red shield. It is known as the Þorskmerkið (“the cod markings”) and the fish was depicted occasionally in a variant form.
- On October 3, 1903, the coat of arms of Iceland was changed to a white falcon on a blue shield. It remained in use until the first version of the coat of arms with the landvættir became official on February 12, 1919, representing the Kingdom of Iceland under the Danish Crown. This lasted until Iceland became a republic.
- When the republic was declared on June 17, 1944, the coat of arms was redesigned; removing the Danish crown and reforming the earlier design of the landvættir.
The theorised coat of arms of the Icelandic Commonwealth.

The coat of arms of the Earldom of Iceland from 1262.

The coat of arms under Dano-Norwegian rule, ca. 16th century 1814, and under Danish rule 1814–1903.

The coat of arms of Denmark from 1819 to 1903. Iceland is presented by the silver stockfish in the lower left corner. Prior to this Iceland, as was the case with Greenland and the Faroe Islands, was represented by the coat of arms of Norway, as they all were part of the Norwegian realm of the Denmark–Norway.

The coat of arms from 1903 to 1919.

The coat of arms of King Christian X of Iceland from 1918 to 1944 and of Denmark from 1903 to 1947. Iceland is represented by the silver falcon in the lower left corner. The falcon was removed from the Danish arms in 1948.

The coat of arms of the Kingdom of Iceland from 1919 to 1944.

The British Coat of Arms during The Allied occupation of Iceland from 1940 to 1944.

The Coat of Arms of The U.S. during The Allied occupation of Iceland from 1940 to 1944.

== See also ==
- Flag of Iceland
- Icelandic heraldry
- Order of the Falcon
- Flag of Denmark
