= Grendel's mother =

Mother of Grendel (Beowulf saga)

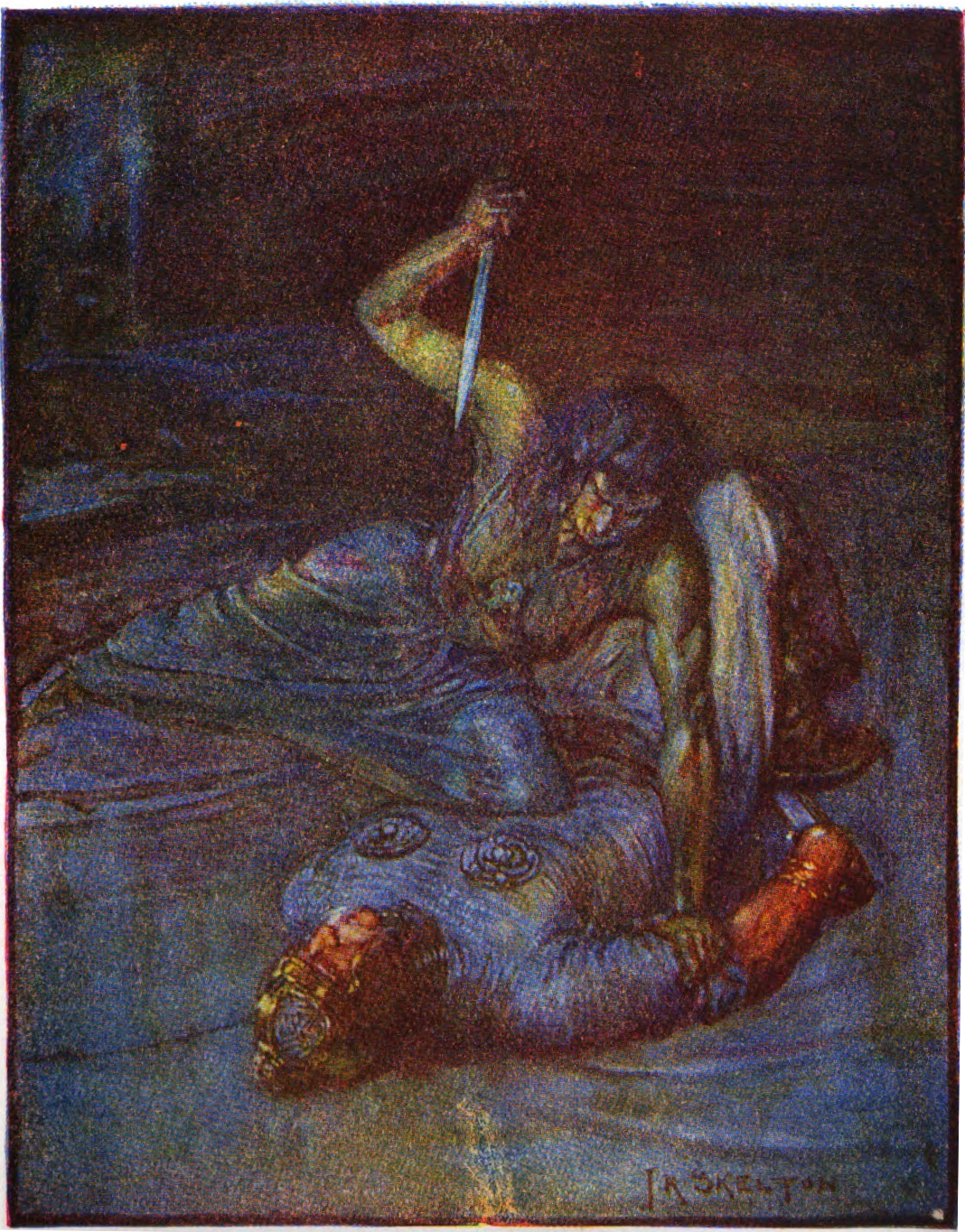
An illustration of Grendel's mother by J. R. Skelton from Stories of Beowulf (1908) described as a "water-witch" trying to stab Beowulf

Grendel's mother (Old English: Grendles mōdor) is one of three antagonists in the anonymous Old English poem Beowulf (c. 700–1000 AD), the other two being Grendel himself and the dragon. Each antagonist reflects different negative aspects of both the hero Beowulf and the heroic society in which the poem is set. Grendel's mother is introduced in lines 1258b to 1259a as: "Grendles mother¨.

Grendel's mother, who is never given a name in the text, is the subject of an ongoing controversy among medieval scholars. This controversy is due to the ambiguity of a few words in Old English which appear in the original Beowulf manuscript. While there is agreement over the word "modor" (mother), the phrase "ides, aglæcwif" is the subject of scholarly debate.

== Story ==
The poem, Beowulf, is contained in the Nowell Codex. As noted in lines 106–114 and lines 1260–1267 of Beowulf, monsters (which include Grendel's mother and Grendel) are descendants of Cain. After Grendel is killed, Grendel's mother attacks Heorot in revenge. Beowulf then ventures into her cave under a lake, and engages in fierce combat with Grendel's mother. She nearly kills him until he sees an ancient sword, with which he kills her, and beheads the dead Grendel. Beowulf then returns to the surface and to his men at the "ninth hour" (l. 1600, "nōn", about 3 pm).

== Function in and structure of the poem ==
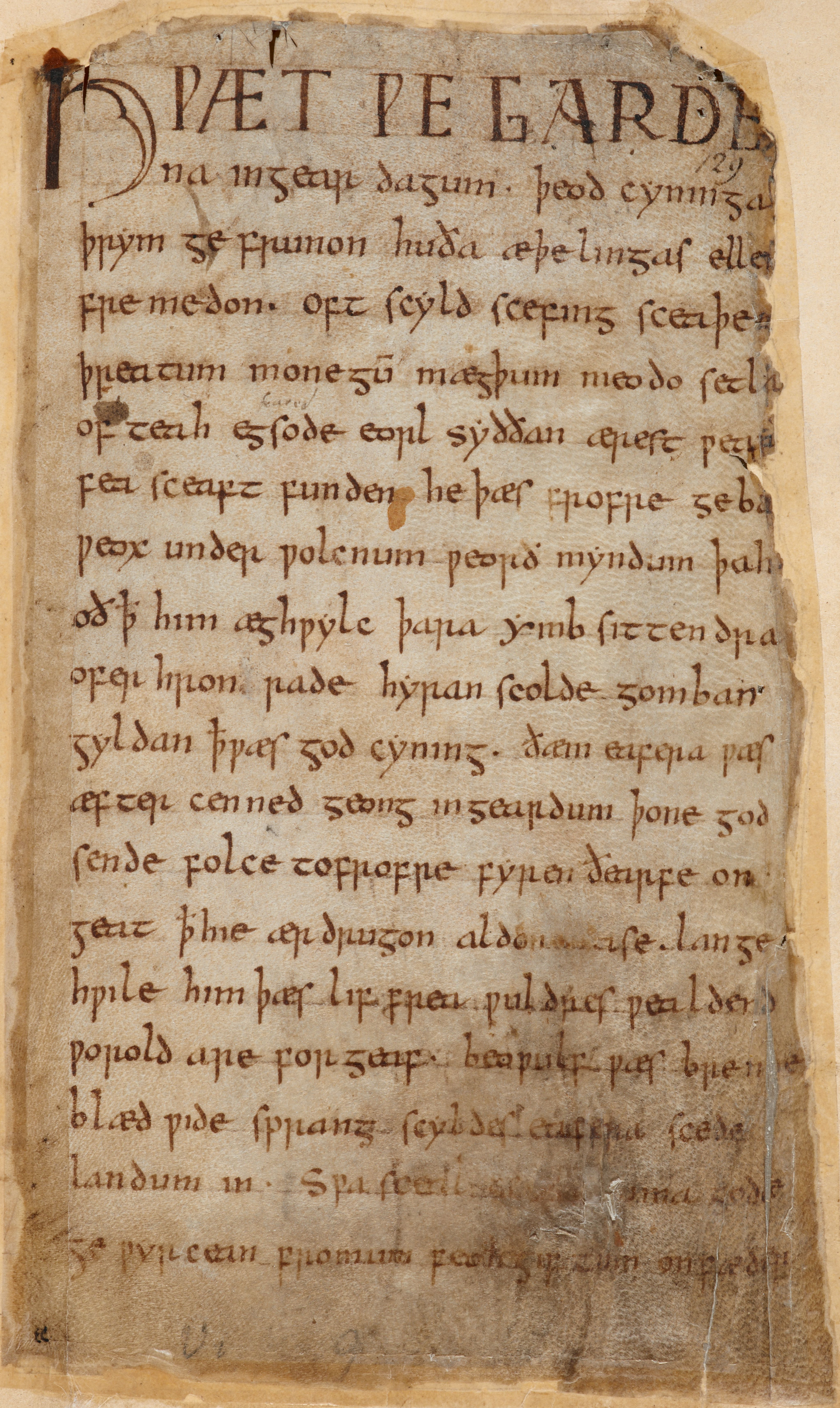
The first page of the Beowulf manuscript

Some scholars have argued that the female characters in Beowulf fulfill certain established roles such as hostess (Wealhþeow and Hygd) and peace-weaver (Freawaru and Hildeburh). Grendel's mother and Modthryth (before her marriage to Offa), challenge these roles, and therefore represent "monster-women".

Jane Chance argues in "The Structural Unity of Beowulf: The Problem of Grendel's Mother" that there are two standard interpretations of the poem: one view which suggests a two-part structure (i.e., the poem is divided between Beowulf's battles with Grendel and with the dragon) and the other, a three-part structure (this interpretation argues that Beowulf's battle with Grendel's mother is structurally separate from his battle with Grendel). Chance stated that, "this view of the structure as two-part has generally prevailed since its inception in J. R. R. Tolkien's Beowulf: The Monsters and the Critics." In contrast, she argued that the three-part structure has become "increasingly popular". She later developed this argument in Woman as Hero in Old English Literature.

== Debates on Grendel's mother ==
There is ongoing debate among medieval scholars concerning the ambiguity of certain words in Old English (related to Grendel's mother) which appear in the original Beowulf manuscript. Because these terms are ambiguous, scholars disagree over aspects of her nature and appearance. As her exact appearance is never directly described in Old English by the original Beowulf poet, part of the debate revolves around what is known, namely her descent from the biblical Cain (who was the first murderer, according to the Abrahamic religions). For some scholars, this descent links her and Grendel to the monsters and giants of the Cain tradition. Other scholars argue that there is "plenty of evidence for defending Grendel's mother as a heroic figure" as she "accepted and adhered to the heroic ethic of the blood-feud, the main difference between Grendel's feckless feud with the noise at Heorot and his mother's purposeful one exacting retribution for the death of her son. In heroic terms, her vengeance for the death of her kinsman Grendel."

This lack of consensus has led to the production of some seminal texts by scholars over the past few decades. One important focus of these articles and books concerns the numerous, and at times opposing, translations of especially the Old English compound "ides aglæcwif" (1259a).

=== Monster or demon ===
Until the late 1970s, all scholarship on Grendel's mother and translations of the phrase "aglæc-wif" were influenced by the edition of noted Beowulf scholar Frederick Klaeber. His edition, Beowulf and the Fight at Finnsburg, has been considered a standard in Beowulf scholarship since its first publication in 1922. According to Klaeber's glossary, "aglæc-wif" translates as: "wretch, or monster of a woman". Klaeber's glossary also defines "aglæca/æglæca" as "monster, demon, fiend" when referring to Grendel or Grendel's mother, or as "warrior, hero" when referring to the character Beowulf.

Klaeber has influenced many translations of Beowulf. Notable interpretations of "aglæc-wif" which follow Klaeber include "monstrous hell-bride" (Heaney), "monster-woman" (Chickering) "woman, monster-wife" (Donaldson), "Ugly troll-lady" (Trask) and "monstrous hag" (Kennedy).

Doreen M. E. Gillam's 1961 essay, "The Use of the Term 'Æglæca' in Beowulf at Lines 893 and 2592", explores Klaeber's dual use of the term "aglæca/æglæca" for the heroes Sigemund and Beowulf as well as for Grendel and Grendel's mother. She argues that "aglæca/æglæca" is used in works besides Beowulf to reference both "devils and human beings". She further argues that this term is used to imply "supernatural", "unnatural" or even "inhuman" characteristics, as well as hostility towards other creatures. Gillam suggests: "Beowulf, the champion of men against monsters, is almost inhuman himself. [Aglæca/æglæca] epitomises, in one word, the altogether exceptional nature of the dragon fight. Beowulf, the champion of good, the 'monster' amongst men, challenges the traditional incarnation of evil, the Dragon: æglæca meets æglæcan."

=== Ides/dis (lady) ===
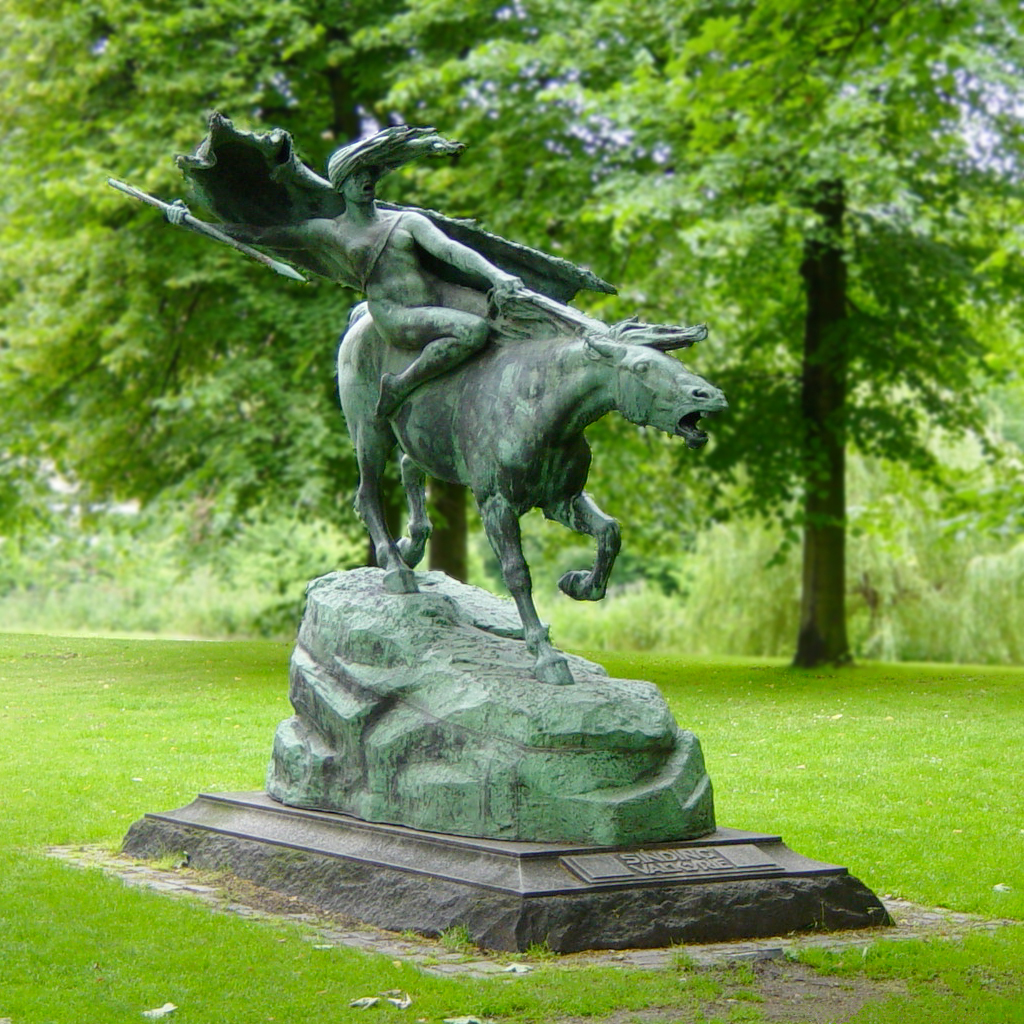
A sculpture of a valkyrie on a horse by Stephan Sinding, 1908

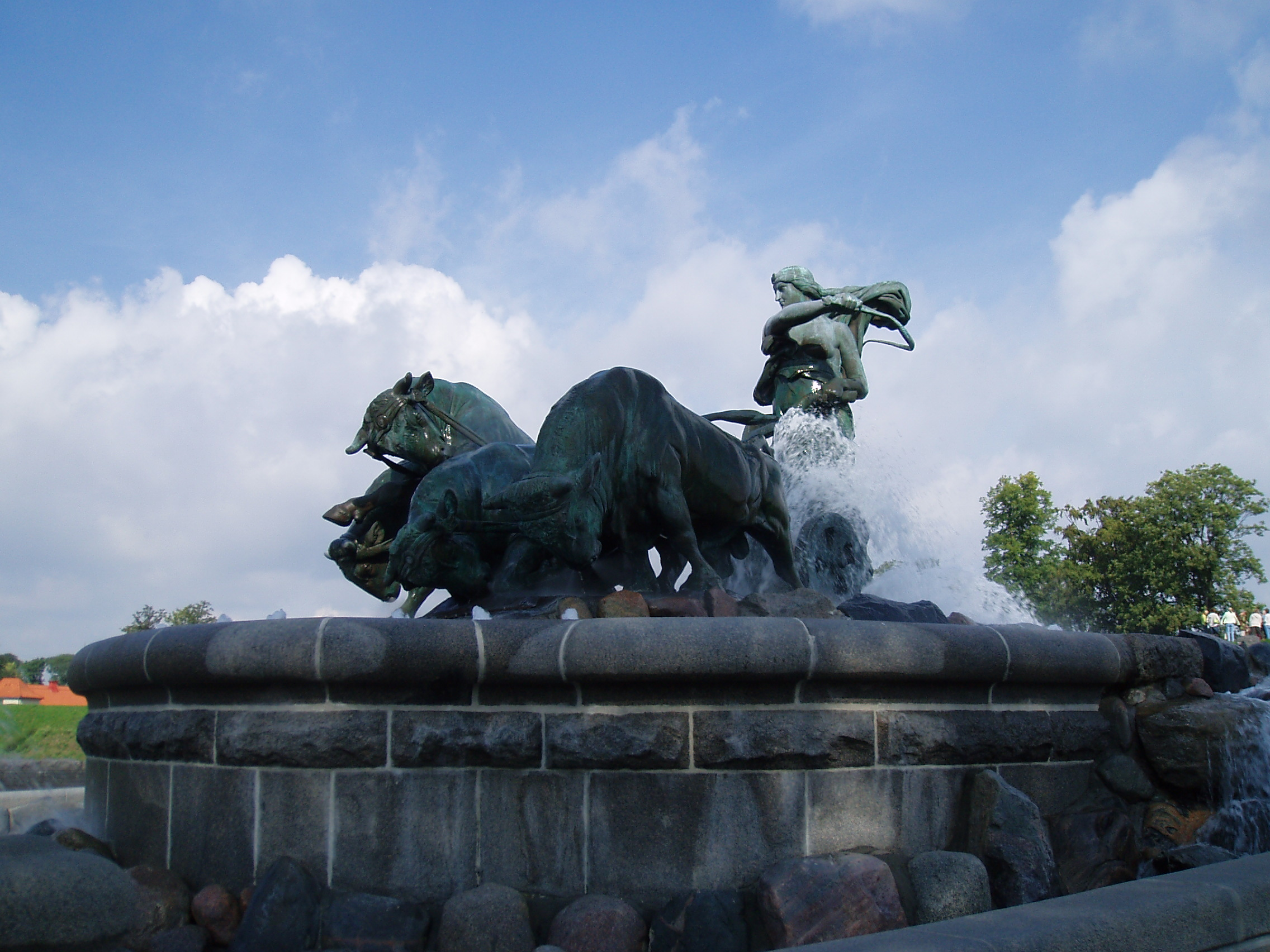
The Gefion Fountain in Copenhagen, Denmark, by Anders Bundgård, 1908

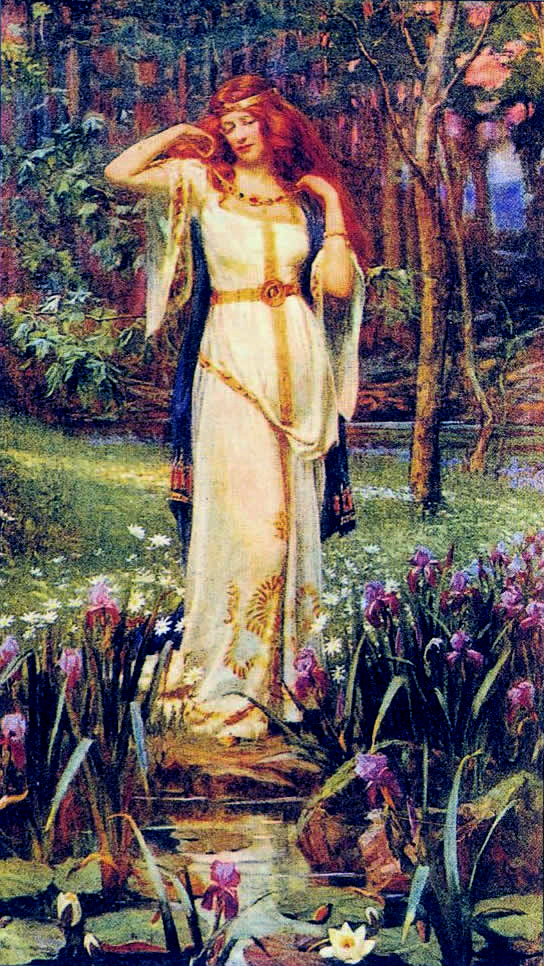
Freyja, in a painting by James Doyle Penrose, 1890

The Old English ides, Old High German itis and Old Norse dís are cognates that all mean "lady", and idisi appears as the name of the Valkyries in the only surviving pagan source in Old High German, the Merseburg Incantations. More generally, in Norse mythology, the Dísir ('ladies') are fate goddesses who can be both benevolent and antagonistic towards mortal people.

Consequently, many have pointed out that dís is probably the original term for the valkyries (lit. "choosers of the slain"), which in turn would be a kenning for dís.

A few scholars have drawn from the work of Eric Stanley by exploring the term ides as "lady" when discussing Grendel's mother, such as Temple ("Grendel's Lady-Mother", 1986) and Taylor (who argues in his 1994 essay that the term Ides indicates that "Grendel's mother is a woman of inherently noble status."). In addition, others have suggested that Grendel's mother may be associated with the Norse figures of the valkyries and of the goddess Gefion who may be an extension of Frigg and Freyja. Freyja, the daughter of the sea god Njörðr, was both a fertility goddess and a goddess of war, battle, death, seiðr, prophecy and was also sometimes associated with the valkyries and disir.

Nora Kershaw Chadwick (1959) and later Helen Damico in two works (Beowulf's Wealhtheow and the Valkyrie Tradition and "The Valkyrie Reflex in Old English Literature") argue that Grendel's mother may refer to the myth of the valkyries. Damico states:

in both their benevolent and malevolent aspects, the valkyries are related to a generic group of half-mortal, half-supernatural beings called idisi in Old High German, ides in Old English, and dis in Old Norse, plural, disir. Both groups are closely allied in aspect and function: they are armed, powerful, priestly [...] The Beowulf poet follows the tradition of depicting the valkyrie-figure as a deadly battle demon in his characterization of Grendel's Mother. As Chadwick has argued, Grendel's Mother, that wælgæst wæfre 'roaming slaughter-spirit' epitomizes the earlier concept of the valkyrie.

Damico later argues in Beowulf's Wealhtheow and the Valkyrie Tradition that Wealtheow and Grendel's mother represent different aspects of the valkyries.

=== Aglæcwif (warrior) ===
Contemporary scholars have suggested that the use of the term "aglæcwif" indicates that Grendel's mother is a woman warrior. In 1979, Beowulf scholars Kuhn and Stanley argued against Klaeber's reading of Grendel's mother. In Old English Aglaeca-Middle Irish Olach Sherman Kuhn questioned Klaeber's translations of both "aglæc-wif" and of "aglæca / æglæca" when referring to Grendel and Grendel's mother, stating that there are

five disputed instances of áglæca [three of which are in Beowulf] 649, 1269, 1512 ... In the first ... the referent can be either Beowulf or Grendel. If the poet and his audience felt the word to have two meanings, 'monster', and 'hero', the ambiguity would be troublesome; but if by áglæca they understood a 'fighter', the ambiguity would be of little consequence, for battle was destined for both Beowulf and Grendel and both were fierce fighters.

Thus Kuhn suggested aglæca should be defined as "a fighter, valiant warrior, dangerous opponent, one who struggles fiercely". He supported his argument by also stating that "if there were one clear instance of áglæca referring to an unwarlike monster, a peaceful demon, or the like, this definition would fall apart." Kuhn concluded that

Grendel's mother was an 'aglæc-wif', 'a female warrior' [...] there is no more reason to introduce the idea of monstrosity or of misery here than there is in line 1519 where she is called merewif, defined simply as 'water-woman', 'woman of the mere'.

Eric Stanley added to the debate by critiquing both Klaeber and Gillam:

Grendel is described as an æglæca, a word which we do not understand. One scholar [Gillam] has, in fact, made investigation of this word a model for the methodology of establishing meaning. The attempt is of interest, but in the end we always come back to the fact that, as Klaeber's glossary shows, the word is used by the poet not only to describe Grendel as here, and later in the poem to describe the dragon, and the monsters of the mere as they attack Beowulf, but also Beowulf himself; and at one point the two enemies, Beowulf and the dragon, are described together using the plural æglæcean. As we assemble the many uses including compounds [...] it becomes clear that it is not pejorative in force. We must not follow Klaeber's distinction of 'wretch, monster, demon, fiend' for Beowulf's enemies, and 'warrior, hero' for Beowulf himself; and we must not abuse Grendel's mother when she is called aglæcwif by translating the word as Klaeber does, 'wretch', or 'monster, of a woman'. We must never forget that she is called there ides aglæcwif (1259) and ides, 'lady', is not a term of abuse [...] the poet does not speak of his monsters abusively.

Other scholars have offered varying opinions on this topic. Christine Alfano also questioned standard translations related to Grendel's mother. She states that she found a "noticeable disparity between the Grendel's mother originally created by the Beowulf poet and the one that occupies contemporary Beowulf translations. Instead of being what Sherman Kuhn calls a 'female warrior', the modern Grendel's mother is a monster. This assumption informs almost all areas of Beowulf scholarship, although there is little evidence for this characterization in the original Anglo-Saxon work." Melinda Menzer offered a different approach, suggesting that "aglæcwif denotes a woman, a human female, who is also aglæca".

==== Dictionary of Old English ====
The Dictionary of Old English, University of Toronto, made the following updates in 1994:

- āglāc-wíf (noun) is translated as female warrior, fearsome woman.
- āglæca (adj.) is translated as formidable, awe-inspiring
- āglæca (noun) is translated as awesome opponent, ferocious fighter

The 1994 DOE translations were supported by George Jack in his 1997 glossary of Beowulf and Bruce Mitchell in his 1998 glossary of Beowulf.

== Depictions in film, literature, and popular culture ==
Grendel's mother has been adapted in a number of different media, including film, literature, and graphic novels.
