= Landdísir =

Ghost, spirit or deity in Norse mythology

In Norse mythology and later Icelandic folklore, landdísir (Old Norse "dísir of the land") are beings who live in landdísasteinar, specific stones located in Northwestern Iceland which were treated with reverence into the 18th and 19th centuries. The landdísir are not recorded in Old Norse sources, but belief in them is assumed from the name landdísasteinar.

== Theories ==
Rudolf Simek says that the landdísir "are perhaps identical to the dísir, female protective guardian spirits, or else related in some way to the landvætter, Icelandic protective spirits." According to Simek, since the landdísir were believed to live in stones and were venerated there, the practice could represent a form of ancestor worship. Simek notes that Icelandic folklore tells of other beings who live in stones and hills, such as dwarfs and elves.

Gabriel Turville-Petre theorizes that "the female landdísir, dwelling in their rocks, were probably not far removed from the masculine elves." Turville-Petre connects their veneration to the continental Scandinavian practice of the Dísablót (the sacrifice to the dísir), the Disting (thing of the dísir), and various Scandinavian place names involving the dísir where worship may have occurred. Turville-Petre concludes that "the landdísir of the Ísafjörður were dead women ancestors of the people who lived there. They had come to be venerated, being goddesses at once of death, fertility, and rebirth."

== See also ==
- Adgilis Deda, a Georgian divinity with a comparable function
