= Landvættir =

Beings in Old Nordic religion, later folklore and modern Heathenry

Four beings commonly identified as landvættir, as described in the Heimskringla version of Óláfs saga Tryggvasonar, as supporters on the coat of arms of Iceland

Landvættir ("land spirits" or "land wights") are spirits of the land in Old Nordic religion, later folk belief and modern Heathenry. They are closely associated with specific locations and their wellbeing is presented as being required for the land they inhabit to be fruitful. In Old Norse sources, they are depicted as being potentially harmful and capable of driving away unwanted individuals and capable of being frightened through human actions such as usage of carved figureheads on ships or níðstangs. Good relationships between humans and landvættir were believed to be fostered through acts like leaving out food for them. However upon the establishment of the church, the practice was labelled heretical and explicitly forbidden in the Norwegian Gulating law codes.

Landvættir have been variously connected by scholars to other beings believed to inhabit the land such as elves, dwarfs and landdísir, with which they were potentially identified at different points in history. Their belief and veneration has been revived in the modern period as part of the practice of modern Heathens.

== Name and etymology ==
Vættr (pl. Vættir) can be translated as "wight" or "being" and is derived from Proto-West Germanic '*wihti' from Proto-Germanic: *wihtiz from Proto-Indo-European: '*wekti' ("cause, sake, thing"), from Proto-Indo-European "*wekʷ-" ("to say, tell"). It is thus cognate with Old English: wiht and its descendants Middle English: wight or Middle English: wiȝt and Modern English "wight". It is further cognate with Scots: wicht, German: Wicht, Dutch: Wicht and is the ancestor of Swedish: vätte, Danish: vætte and Icelandic: vættur.

As a compound, land-vættir has been variously translated as "guardian spirits of a country", "land-spirits", "landwights" or "nature spirits".

== Medieval period ==
=== Offence through human actions ===
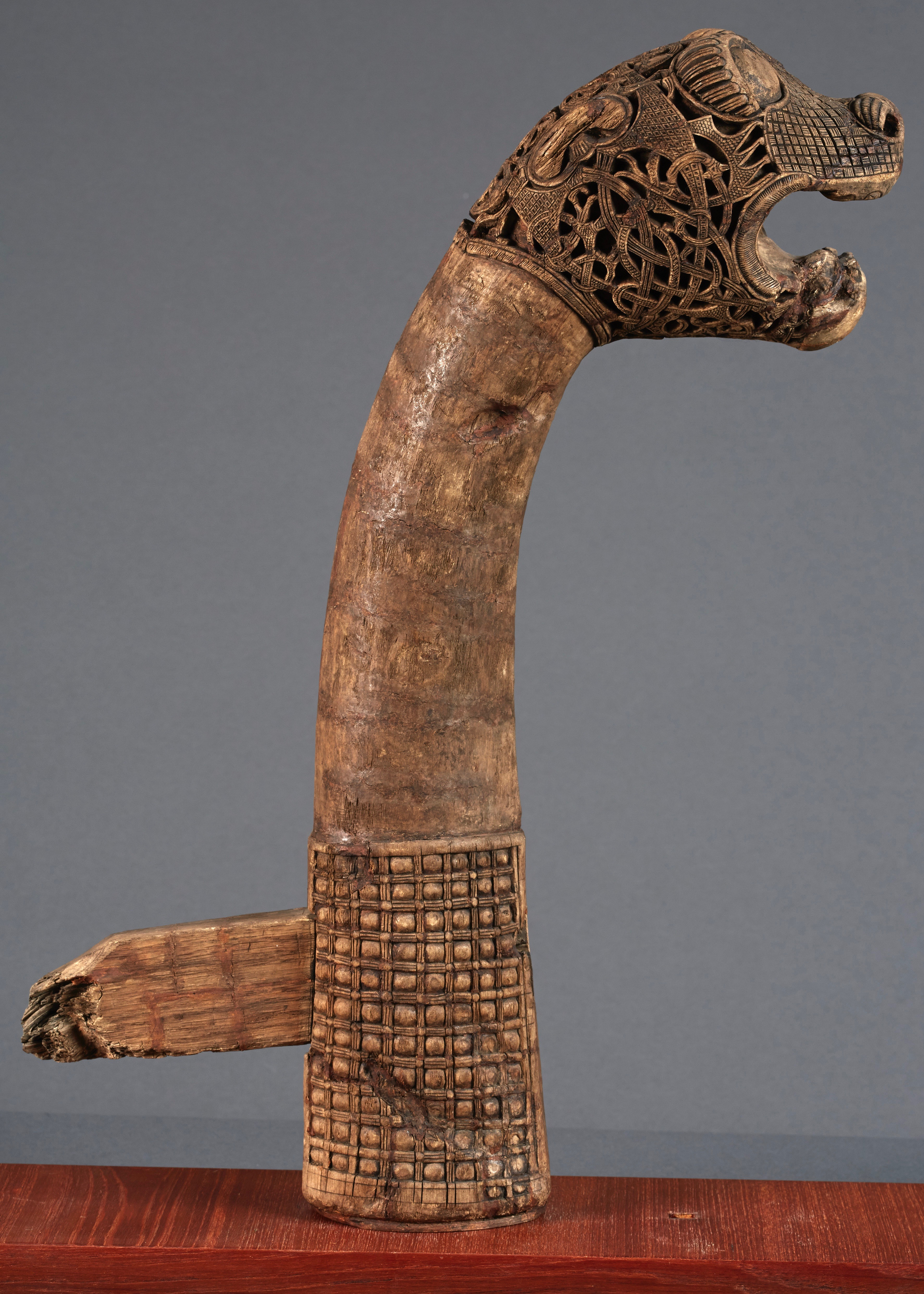
Carved animal headed posts from the Oseberg ship burial

In Úlfljótslǫg, a law aiming to prevent upsetting landvættir:

Þat var upphaf inna heiðnu laga, at menn skyldu eigi hafa höfuðskip í haf, en ef þeir hefði, þá skyldi þeir af taka höfuð, áðr þeir kæmi í lands sýn, ok sigla eigi at landi með gapandi höfðum eða gínandi trjónum, svá at landvættir fælist við.

— Old Norse text
Translation:

It was the beginning of the preamble of the heathen laws that men should not take ships to sea with carved figure heads upon their sterns, but if they did, they should take them off before they came in sight of land and not sail to land with gaping heads or yawning snouts lest the guardian feys of the land should be scared thereat.

— Modern English Translation

Eyrbyggja saga depicts human waste as scaring elves, identified by some scholars as landvættir. In this account, Þórólfr Mostrarskegg sets aside a skerry that he names Dritsker ("Shit-skerry") so that they would not defile with their faeces Helgafell, which he held holy.

=== Harming and scaring humans ===
Landvættir are often depicted as deeply connected to a particular place and as being willing and able to harm people who live there if the landvættir do not consider them welcome. Landnámabók for example describes how two brothers, Ingólf and Hjörleif, went to settle Iceland from Norway. Ingólf performed blóts often while his brother did not. Hjörleif was later killed by his thralls at Hjörleifshöfði which Ingólf attributes to his lack of adherence to heathen customs. Later, the book states that no one dared live where Hjörleif had settled because of the landvættir. Consistent with other accounts, this depicts Iceland as inhabited by landvættir and has been further argued to represent a belief that they might harm settlers if the appropriate ritual precautions were not carried out. Alternative suggestions have been made such as that the landvættir were angry because of the spilling of blood on the land they inhabited or that they had been frightened by it and so the land would not prosper.

They further feature in saga literature, for example in the Heimskringla version of Óláfs saga Tryggvasonar when they drive away a possible invasion from Harald Bluetooth:

Haraldr konungr bauð kungum manni at fara í hamförum til Íslands ok freista hvat hann kynni segja honum. Sá fór í hvals líki. En er hann kom til landsins, þá fór hann vestr fyrir norðan landit; hann sá at fjöll öll ok hólar váru full af landvættum, sumt stórt en sumt smátt.

— Old Norse text
Translation:

King Harald told a warlock to hie to Iceland in some altered shape, and to try what he could learn there to tell him: and he set out in the shape of a whale. And when he came near to the land he went to the west side of Iceland, north around the land, where he saw all the mountains and hills full of guardian-spirits, some great, some small.

— Modern English Translation

After this, the man in whale-shape swims around Iceland and each time he reaches a new part he is driven away. First on the East side by a large dragon followed by snakes, toads and lizards who blew atter, or poison, at him, then on the North side by a great bird with many smaller birds, next in the West a large bull followed by beasts and other landvættir, and finally a huge bergrisi with an iron staff in the South followed by many other jötnar. It is unclear whether all these protective beings were considered landvættir, given that the bull is explicitly said to be followed by landvættir, however, the four figures are what most Icelanders understand by the term. It is further unclear if the imagery of these four beings is drawn from traditional lore, but scholars typically belief it is heavily influenced by Christian imagery of the Four Evangelists. It has been noted that in an account of this same event from Jómsvíkinga saga does not reference the magic-worker or the landvættir. Knýtlinga saga, however, retells the account from Heimskringla and refers to the beings instead as óvættir ("evil spirits"), consistent with it being told from a Danish perspective.

In Egils saga, when in Norway, Egil Skallagrímsson erects a níðstöng, a horses head on a stake, as an insult to the landvættir. He curses them to not be able to find their dwellings until they have driven Erik Bloodaxe and Gunnhild from Norway. The two are forced to abandon Norway the next year, although the saga intentionally leaves the cause unclear.

=== Association with fertility ===
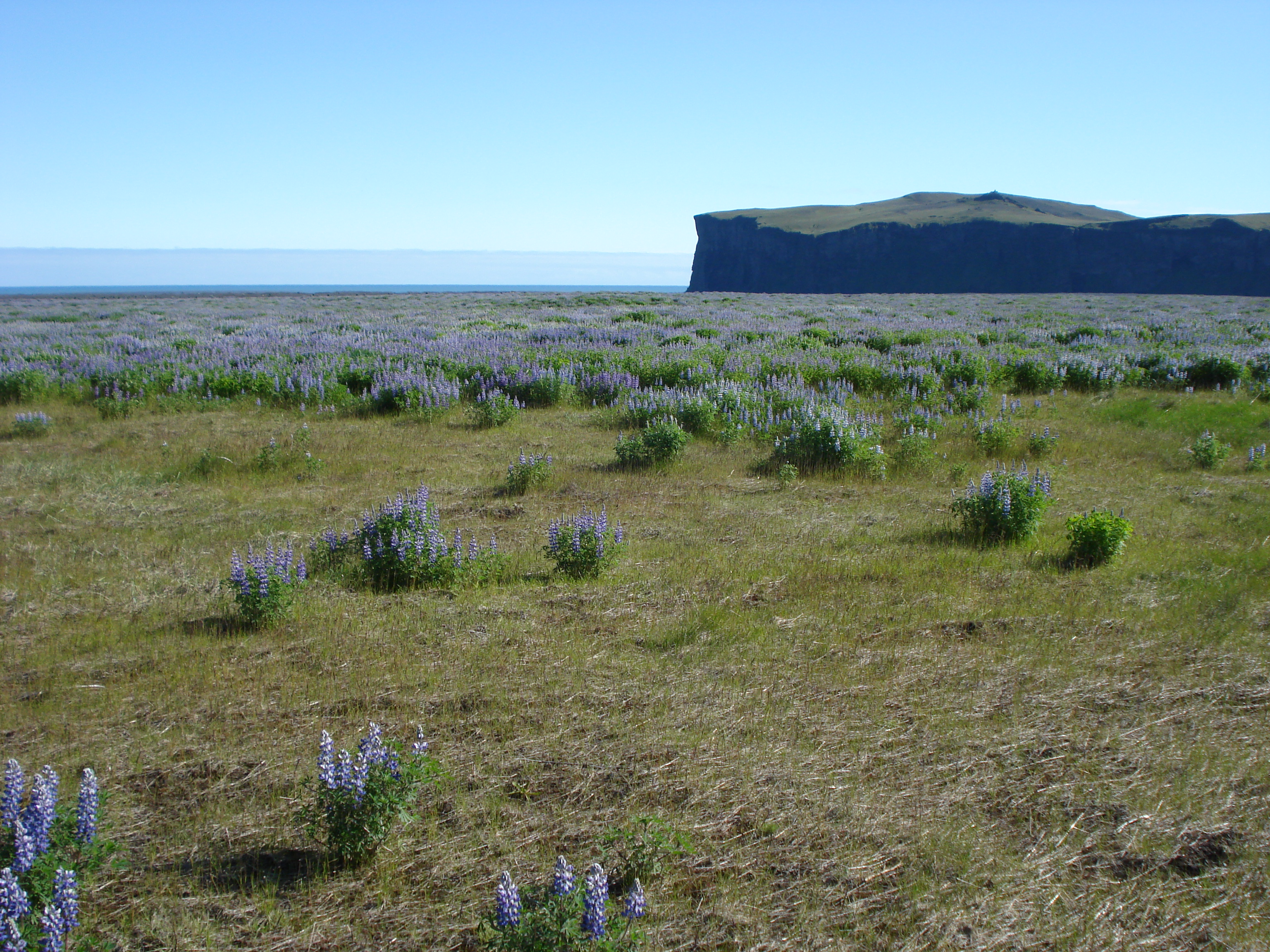
Hjörleifshöfði where, according to Landnámabók, a man named Hjörleif was killed by his thralls and that was later not settled out of fear of landvættir.

In Landnámabók, one account describes a bergbúi ("rock-dweller") making an agreement with a man named Björn, who had few goats after fleeing from a lava flow. After this, a billy goat appears and has many children with his nanny goats, making him rich from all the livestock he owned. It describes that landvættir could be seen with Björn by those who had second sight. It has been proposed that in this context, bergbúar are synonymous with landvættr, supported by the idea that landvættir live in stones, mountains and hills. It has been further suggested that in return, Björn may have been expected to make food offerings, as is recorded as being performed by women for landvættir in Heimslýsing ok Helgifrœði, a homily found in the Hauksbók. In this account, the women take food to stone piles or flat stones, hoping that in return the landvættir would make them prosperous.

=== Banning and criticism of belief and worship ===
The Norwegian Gulating laws, written in the latter half of the 13th century, made illegal the belief that howes, wooded areas and waterfalls, were inhabited by landvættir, considering it a heresy and belonging to the heathen religion. (Note: The Old Norse is: "En þæssir luttir heyra til villu ok hædins atrunaddar [...] ok at trua a landvættir at se i lundum æda haugum æda forsum.") Similarly, the author of the homily Heimslýsing ok Helgifrœði states that the willingness of some women to give offerings to landvættir results from their stupidity.

=== Further scholarship ===
==== Relation to other beings ====
Landvættir have been discussed in relation to landdísasteinar (landdísir stones). These are stones in northwestern Iceland that were described as having been respected as late as the 19th century, with it being seen as inappropriate to mow grass or let children play near them. The term landdísir is not attested in Old Norse sources but can be reconstructed from the term landdísasteinar, where they were likely believed to dwell. Based on this living in rocks, it has been proposed that they are closely connected to landvættir and it has been noted that other beings in Germanic folklore are believed to live in these places too such as elves and dwarfs.

Relationships between people and landvættir have been further linked to a wider pattern of people in the same cultural context worshipping and receiving advice from spirits living in waterfalls, woods, and rocks at which they would make offerings. This is attested in Landnámabok, which records settlers giving offerings to a waterfall and a holy grove. Beyond this, Þorvalds þáttr viðfǫrla and Kristni saga recount a tale in which an Icelandic farmer named Koðrán has a partnership with a spirit living in a stone referred to as a spámaðr or ármaðr which is eventually driven away when a bishop sprinkles the stone in which it lived with holy water. It has been noted that the being is likely modelled on landvættir and bergbúar, closely resembling their portrayals in other sources.

Some scholars have suggested that landvættir are chthonic and spirits of the dead, but others have interpreted them as nature spirits, since they sometimes live in land that has never been populated.

It has been argued that in early 12th century Iceland, álfar and landvættir were conceived of as distinct beings, with landvættir living in fells and hills, and elves being more similar to gods. The account of a blót being made to elves living in a hill in Kormaks saga, according to this proposition, would be an early stage in the merging of the two beings. The folklorish representation of elves would be a result of this later conflation, seen in later saga material like Norna-Gests þáttr, Hrólfs saga kraka and Þiðriks saga.

==== Absence of mythological importance ====
Landvættir have been argued to not have had any role in Nordic mythology as they are not mentioned in any Eddic material.

== Modern period ==
=== Modern Heathenry ===
Jörmundur Ingi Hansen, former High Priest of the Ásatrúarfélagið, said that landvættir are "spirits and they in some way control the safety of the land, the fertility of the land, and so on." According to him, they are "tied to a spot in the landscape, to a huge rock, to a mountain, or to a specially beautiful place" and that place can be recognized by being more beautiful than "just a few yards away".

=== Popular culture ===
The four beings identified as the landvættir of Iceland are depicted on the Icelandic coat of arms, on the obverse of the Icelandic króna coins, and the team crest of Iceland's national football teams.

== See also ==
- Wight, a spirit or being in Germanic lore
- Animism, religious belief that objects, places, and creatures all possess a distinct spiritual essence
- Cofgod, Anglo-Saxon household gods
- Rå, spirits of the land in later Scandinavian folklore
- Genius loci, spirits of a place in classical Roman religion
- Kami, venerated beings in Shinto, often associated with natural sites

== Bibliography ==
=== Primary ===
- Sturluson, Snorri (1961). Heimskringla. Part two, Sagas of the Norse Kings. Translated by Laing, Samuel. London: Dent. ISBN 0460008471.
- Þorgilsson, Ari; Ellwood, Thomas (1898). The Book of the Settlement of Iceland: Tr. from the Original Icelandic of Ari the Learned. T. Wilson.
- "Landnámabók (Part 4)". heimskringla.com.
- "Saga Ólafs Tryggvasonar". heimskringla.no.

=== Secondary ===
- Blain, Jenny (2000). Wights and Ancestors: Heathenism in a Living Landscape. Wiltshire: Wyrd's Well. ISBN 0953904407.
- Davidson, Hilda Roderick Ellis (1988). Myths and symbols in pagan Europe : early Scandinavian and Celtic religions. Manchester University Press. ISBN 978-0-7190-2207-4.
- de Vries, Jan (1956). "Das heilige Amt". Altgermanische Religionsgeschichte. 1: 260.
- Gunnell, Terry (2007). "How Elvish were the Álfar?". Constructing Nations, Reconstructing Myth. Making the Middle Ages. 9. Brepols Publishers: 111–130. doi:10.1484/m.mmages-eb.3.3608. ISBN 978-2-503-52393-4. S2CID 163209884.
- Hughes, Thomas Andrew (2022). "[Dixit] non se carere posse consortio praedecessorum suorum, 'He said he was unable to be without his predecessors': Attitudes towards the damnation of heathen ancestors in Old Norse-Icelandic literature" (PDF). Sagas and the Circum-Baltic Arena. 18: 128–134.
- Meyland, Nicolas (2013). "The (Re)conversion of the "Spirits of the Land" in Medieval Iceland". Revue de l'histoire des religions. 230 (3): 333–354.
- Noetzel, Justin T. (2018). "7 Outlaws and the Undead: Defining Sacred and Communal Space in Medieval Iceland". Dealing With The Dead. Brill. pp. 175–200. ISBN 978-90-04-35833-1.
- Nygaard, Simon (2021). "ein lǫg ok einn siðr: Law, Religion, and their Role in the Cultivation of Cultural Memory in Pre-Christian Icelandic Society". Scandinavian-Canadian Studies. 28: 144–177. doi:10.29173/scancan205. ISSN 2816-5187. S2CID 246009592.
- Phelpstead, Carl (2014). "Ecocriticism and Eyrbyggja saga" (PDF). Leeds Studies in English.
- Sanmark, Alexandra (2010). "Chapter 8 Living On: Ancestors and the Soul". Signals of Belief in Early England: Anglo-Saxon Paganism Revisited. Oxbow Books. ISBN 978-1-84217-395-4. JSTOR j.ctt1cd0nf9.14.
- Schanda, Flora (2018). ""fjöll öll ok hólar váru fullir af landvéttum":: The Old Norse landvættir and related mythological beings". University of Vienna.
- Simek, Rudolf (2008). A Dictionary of Northern Mythology. Translated by Hall, Angela. BOYE6. ISBN 9780859915137.
- Steven, Rachael. "Iceland's national football team gets a new identity". Creative Review.
- Turville-Petre, Edward Oswald Gabriel (1975). Myth and Religion of the North: the religion of ancient Scandinavia (Repr ed.). Westport, Conn: Greenwood Press. ISBN 9780837174204.
- "Old Icelandic Dictionary - Landvættr". Old Icelandic Dictionary.
- "Old Icelandic Dictionary - Vættr". Old Icelandic Dictionary.
- "wight". Wiktionary, the free dictionary. 6 September 2023.
- "Reconstruction:Proto-Germanic/wihtiz". Wiktionary, the free dictionary. 9 April 2023.
- "Iceland's Goalkeeper-Film Director Makes Reveal Video for Bold New Crest". Sports Illustrated. ABG-SI LLC. 1 July 2020.
