= IDIS (company) =

International security technology company

IDIS Co., Ltd.
- Type: Public
- Traded as: 054800:KS
- Industry: Video Surveillance
- Founded: 1997; 29 years ago South Korea
- Founders: Y.D. Kim, Albert Ryu, J.H. Jeong
- Headquarters: Yuseong-gu, Daejeon, South Korea
- Area served: Worldwide
- Products: Surveillance technology, cameras, NVRs, DVRs, monitors, surveillance software, DirectIP, IDIS Security Suite, DirectCX

IDIS (054800:KS) is a security technology company based in South Korea. It is headquartered just outside of Seoul and operates globally through regional offices and key strategic partners. IDIS has more than two million recorders installed worldwide and more than 16.5 million cameras use IDIS technology. The company has twice been named one of the 200 "best under a billion" by Forbes.

== History ==
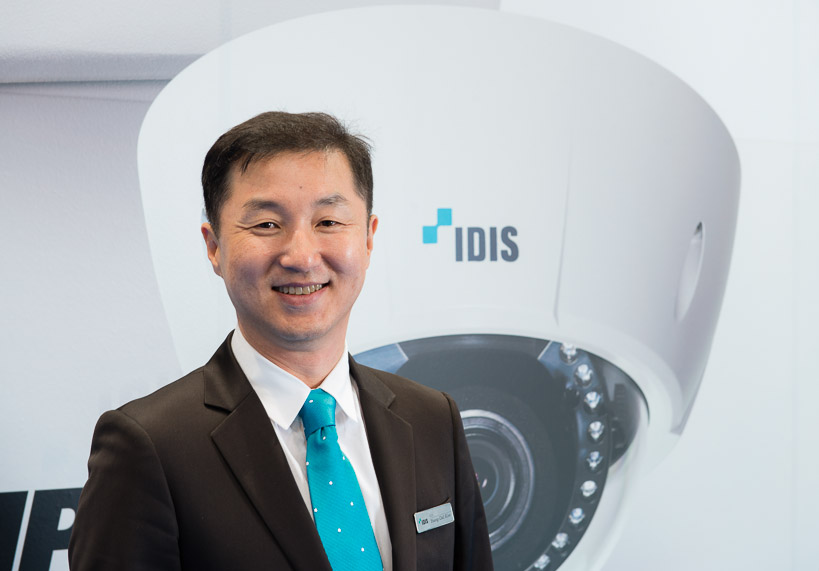
Dr. Y.D. Kim is co-founder and CEO of IDIS.

IDIS was founded in 1997 by Y.D. Kim, Albert Ryu, and J.H. Jeong, as Intelligent Digital Integrated Security Co., Ltd., with a focus on digital video recording (DVR) technology. The company quickly grew, gaining certification as a "Technology Venture Oriented Company" in 1999, and a listing on the KOSDAQ stock exchange in 2001. The company also became the number one seller of DVRs in the surveillance industry, as an Original Design Manufacturer/Original Equipment Manufacturer (ODM/OEM) for leading surveillance solution providers.

In the mid-2000s, the company began a series of in-house innovations and acquisitions that expanded the company's focus beyond DVRs to include next-generation camera and network video recording (NVR) offerings and industrial display technologies. In 2013, IDIS implemented changes to its business and began to transition away from being a supplier of manufactured goods to other companies and towards selling its own branded products. As part of this change, IDIS launched a branded security solution, DirectIP™, at the 2013 IFSEC International security exhibition in Birmingham, United Kingdom. The company subsequently launched DirectIP and other components of the IDIS Total Solution in the Middle East in 2014, at the Intersec exhibition in Dubai, United Arab Emirates, and the Americas in 2015, at the ISC West trade show in Las Vegas, Nevada. At each regional launch, the company debuted regional headquarters and staff dedicated to the sale and support of IDIS branded offerings in those areas.

In August 2023, it was announced IDIS had completed the acquisition of the Coppell-headquartered electronic security product company, Costar Technologies, Inc.

Currently, Dr. Y.D. Kim serves as CEO of IDIS.

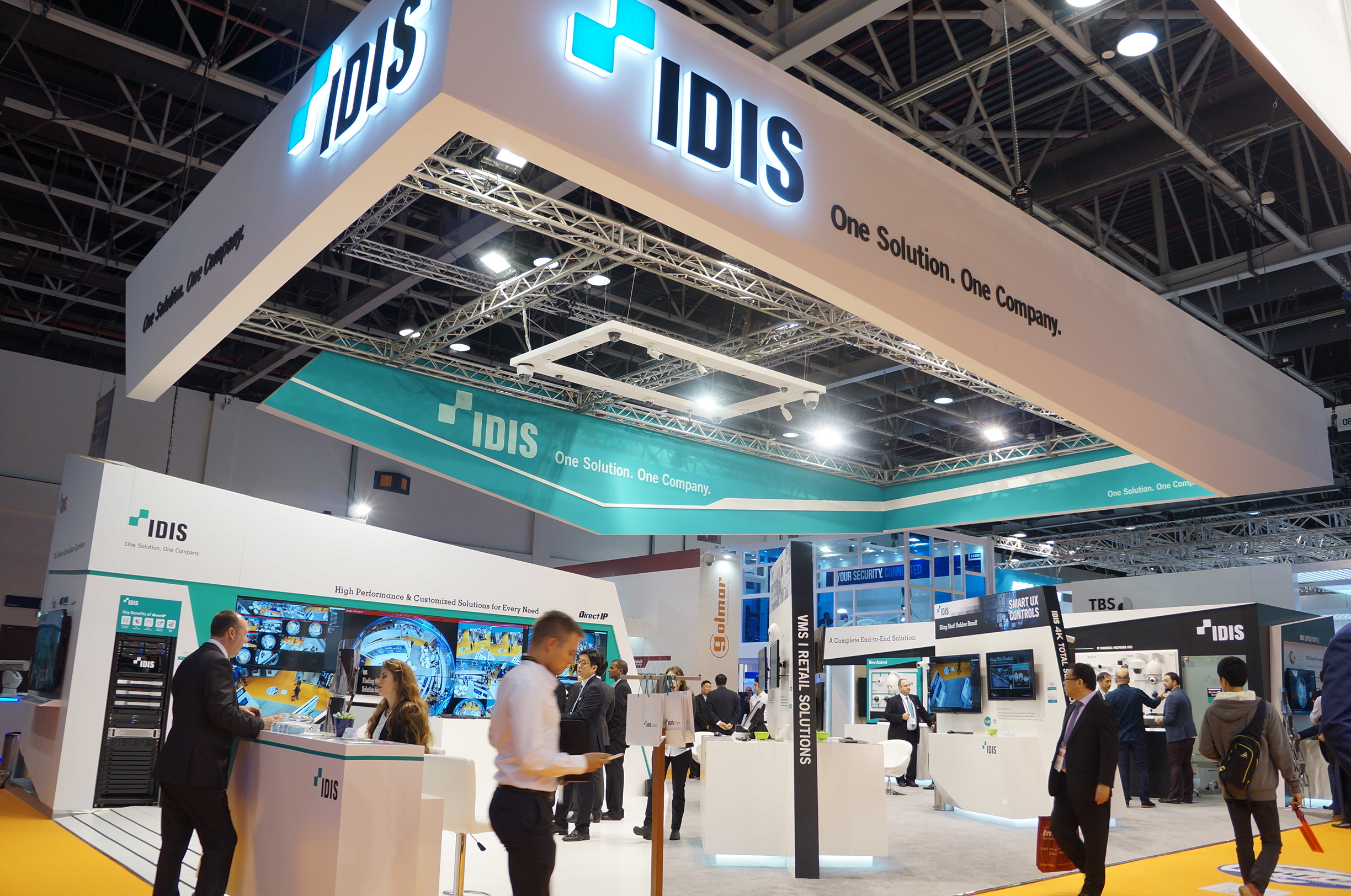
IDIS innovations are featured at the INTERSEC trade show in 2016.

== Innovation ==
IDIS was an early pioneer in digital video recording, leading the security industry's shift from VCR recording to DVR technology, growing to become the world's top selling provider of DVRs to the security marketplace. IDIS held this position until the company's strategic shift in focus toward the development and sale of latest-generation NVR and IP technologies in the mid-to-late 2010s.

Additional technical milestones include IDIS's release of RAS, a mobile remote review for mobile phones and PDA in 2007, INC (featured on the D1 IP Camera) and MMX, a mini-matrix switcher, in 2008. In 2009, IDIS developed and launched ISP100, a H.264 based image processing IC for DVRs as well as iNEX, a VMS.

== Locations ==
In addition to the IDIS headquarters and corporate offices outside Seoul, South Korea, IDIS maintains key offices with regional responsibilities throughout the world, including IDIS Europe, located near London, United Kingdom; IDIS Middle East, based in Dubai, United Arab Emirates; and IDIS America, located near Dallas, Texas, in the United States.

== IDIS Holdings Co., Ltd. ==
The IDIS business falls under IDIS Holdings Co., Ltd., a parent company with annual turnover of more than $450M. The company's other subsidiaries include Kortek Corporation, a leading manufacturer of display technologies for industry use; HD PRO Co., Ltd., a video surveillance technology company; and IDP Corp., Ltd., which manufacturers ID card printers."
