= Guðrúnarkviða =

Three different heroic poems in the Poetic Edda

Guðrúnarkviða I, II and III are three different heroic poems in the Poetic Edda with the same protagonist, Gudrun.

In Guðrúnarkviða I, Gudrun finds her dead husband Sigurd. She cries and laments her husband with beautiful imagery.

In Guðrúnarkviða II, she recapitulates her life in a monologue.

In Guðrúnarkviða III, one of Attila's (Atli) bondmaids accuses her of infidelity with king Theodoric (Þjóðrekr) of the Goths. Gudrun proves her innocence by picking up gems from the bottom of a boiling cauldron with her bare white hands.
