= Blót =

Religious practice in Germanic paganism

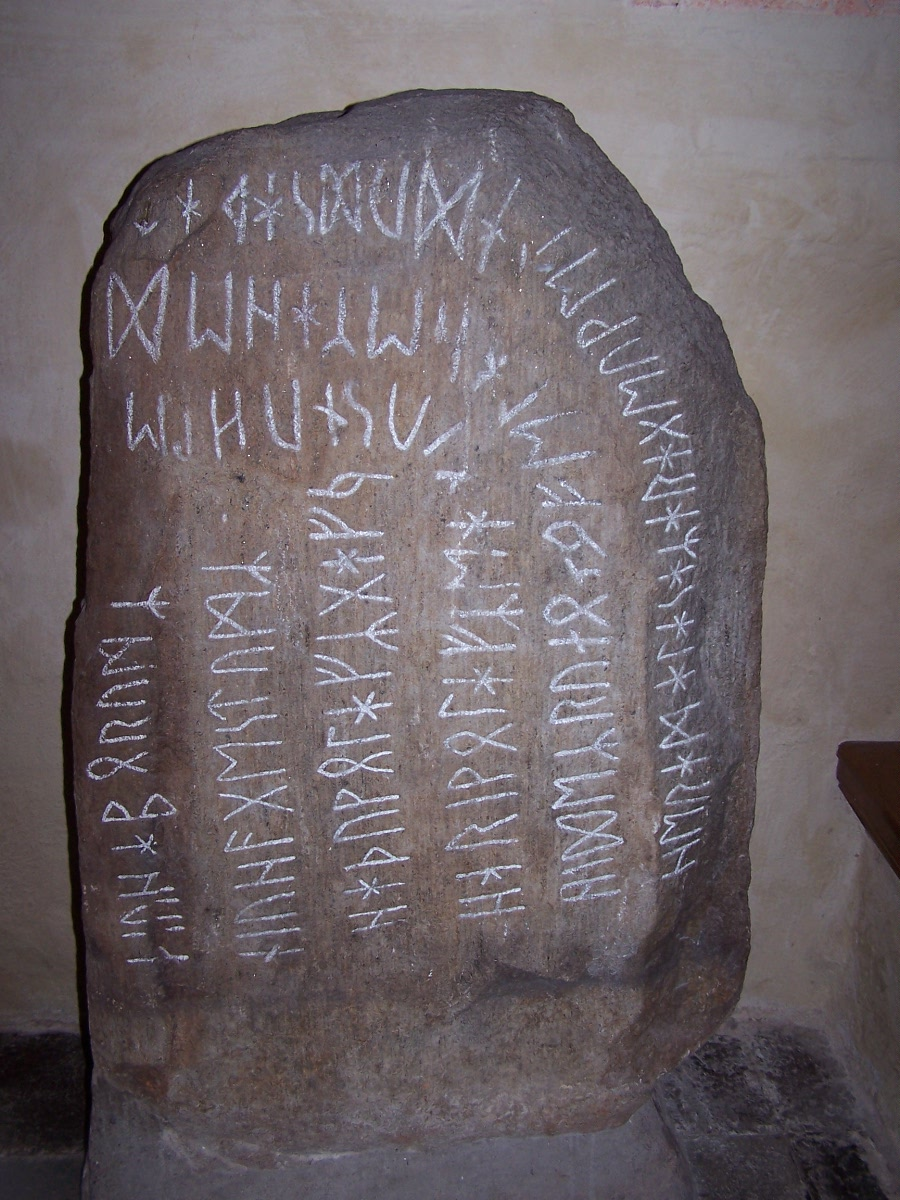
The Stentoften Stone, bearing a runic inscription that likely describes a blót of nine bucks and nine stallions bringing fertility to the land.

Blót (Old Norse and Old English) or geblōt (Old English) are religious ceremonies in Germanic paganism that centred on the killing and offering of an animal to a particular being, typically followed by the communal cooking and eating of its meat. Old Norse sources present it as a central ritual in Old Nordic religion that was intimately connected with many wider aspects of life. Large blót are often described as taking place in halls, organised by the rulers of the region who were expected to carry out the practice on behalf of the people. Blót were central to the legitimacy of rulers and Christian rulers refusing to hold them were at times replaced by more willing alternatives and driven out of the land. Smaller, household blót were sometimes recorded as being led by women. Beyond strengthening legitimacy for the ruling elites, the performance of blót was often to ensure the fertility of the land, a good harvest and peace, although they are also recorded as being performed for divination or to achieve desired results in legal matters.

After the establishment of Christianity, blót were routinely made punishable offences, as seen in early Germanic legal codes, with the recipients of the worship and sacrifice often equated with demons. Despite this, some aspects of the practice were likely incorporated into local Christian culture and continued into the modern period. The conscious performing of blót has also been revived in the modern period as part of the practice of modern heathens.

== Etymology and meaning ==
=== Etymology ===
The verb form is seen in Old Norse: blóta ("to worship; to sacrifice"), Gothic: blotan ("to serve (God); to worship"; to honour (through sacrifice)"), Old English: blōtan ("to sacrifice") and Old High German: blōzan. The Proto-Germanic form of the verb can be reconstructed as the strong verb *blōtanan, or *blōtan meaning "to sacrifice".

The noun form is seen in Old English: blót and ge-blót ("sacrifice"), and Old Norse: blót ("sacrifice; worship"). A Proto-Germanic form of the noun can be similarly reconstructed as *blōtan. A similar and related form can be reconstructed as *blōtan from Old High German: bluostar ("sacrifice") and Gothic: blostreis, a component of guþ-blostreis ("worshipper of God"). Blót can also be used to mean "idol-worship" in general, an "idol" (often in the form blœti) or metaphorically to mean "cursing" or "swearing" in Christian times due to the negative view of heathenry. (Note: Examples of blót being used to mean "idol" is seen in compound nouns such as mat-blót and leir-blót which have been translated as "dough-" and "clay-idol" respectively.)

The shared Germanic root has been proposed to be related to *blōtan ("to blow; to bloom; to blossom"), which is further connected to *blōđan ("blood"). A connection has been further proposed to Latin: flamen ("priest"), although it has been argued that the validity of this is dependent on the exact root of flamen which cannot be determined with certainty. (Note: The uncertainty in etymology of flāmen results from it being unclear whether the root word was *flā-, *flād- or *flāg-.)

=== Usage ===
In the context of "to worship" or "to worship with sacrifice", the Old Norse verb blóta is typically used with that being worshipped in the accusative case, and rarely with it in the dative case. The dative case is more typically used for the object being sacrificed. The verb is often followed by the aim of the blót, for example til friðar, sigrs, langlífis, árs, byrjar ("for peace, victory, long life, good season, fair wind").

=== In compounds ===
Old Norse: Blót is found in many compound words relating to worship or sacrifice. These include adjectives such as blót-auðigr ("rich in sacrifices") and terms for individuals also include it is a prefix such as blót-biskup, blót-kennimaðr, or blót-goði ("heathen priest"), blót-hofðingi ("heathen chief"). Other compounds include recipients of worship such as blót-guð ("heathen god") and blót-kálfr ("calf worshipped with sacrifices"). Items with religious function can also include it as a prefix such as blót-bolli ("sacrificial bowl") and blót-klæði ("garments worn at sacrifices"), and it can refer to religious concepts such as blót-dómr or blót-skapr ("idolatry"), and blótnaðr which is used to mean both "sacrificing to heathen gods" and "idolatry".

== Components of the practice ==
=== Location ===
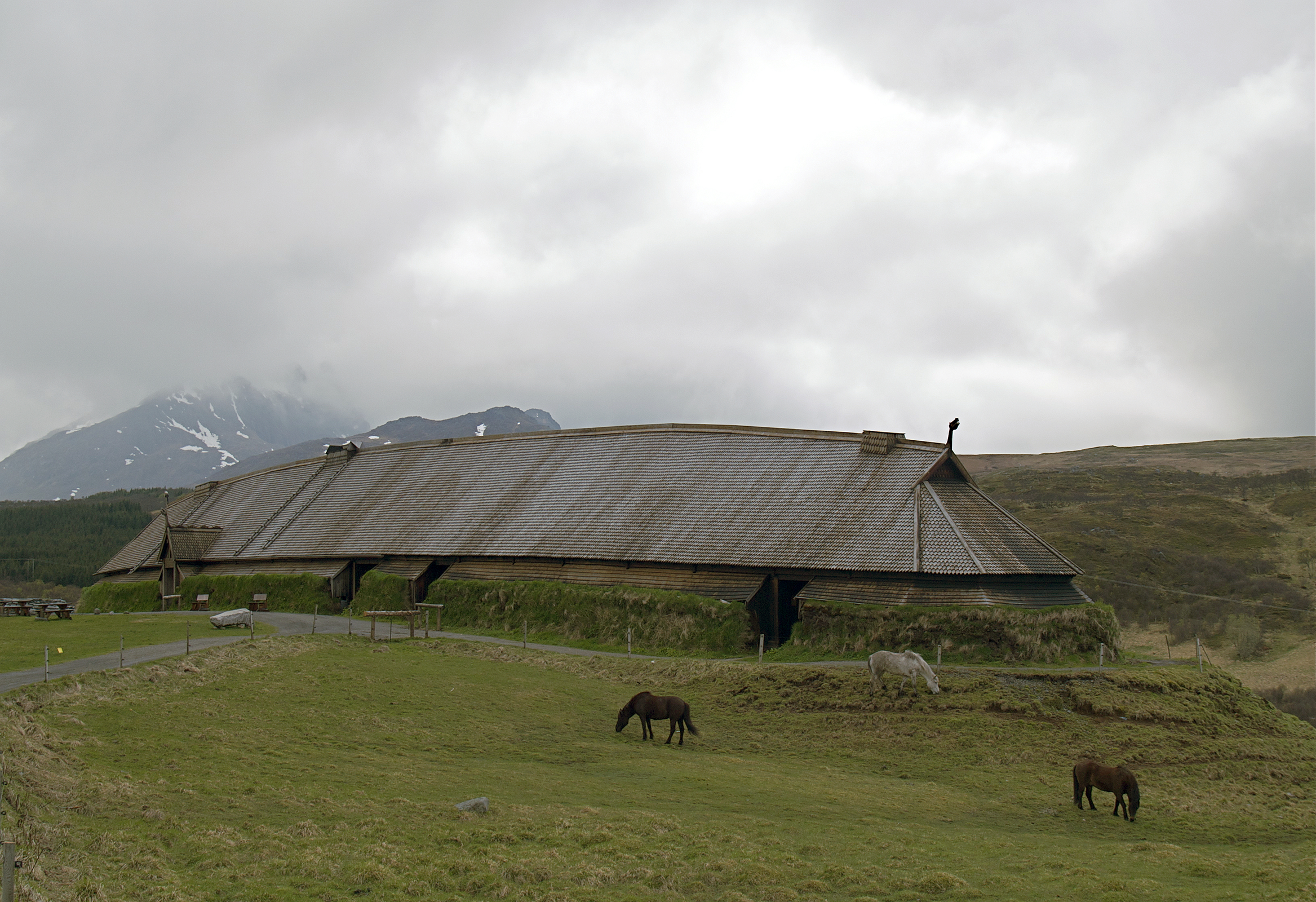
A reconstructed Viking Age hall at the Lofotr Viking Museum in Lofoten, Norway

It has been proposed that during the Migration Period, religious organisation drastically changed, with rulers gaining enough power to centralise sacrifices and ceremonies to their own homes rather than in outdoor spaces such as bogs and lakes, as had been done before. These indoor cultic buildings are referred to in Old Norse sources variously as hof, hǫrgar, goðahús, blóthús.

Sources do still record Viking Age blót taking place at a diverse range of sites, with groves, hofs and waterfalls being described as the recipients of blót, along with beings such as gods, elves and heathen vættir. Some nouns for places include blót as a prefix, suggesting them as sites where these ceremonies took place, such as blót-haugr ("sacrificial mound or cairn") and blót-hof ("heathen house of worship"). Kjalnesinga saga describes how there was a site near a large hof called Blótkelda ("sacrificial fen/bog/well/spring" or "fen near the heathen temple") into which sacrifices were thrown during sacrificial feasts. This idea is also reflected in Icelandic placenames such as Blótkelda at Möðrudalur and Goðakelda ("fen/spring of the gods") at Mývatn.

=== Killing of humans and other animals ===
The written sources and the archaeological record indicate that in Old Norse religious practice, the sacrifice of animals, particularly pigs and horses, played a significant part in the blót. Closer in conception to a gift, it usually involved killing animals, and sometimes humans, in ritual fashion.

Adam of Bremen's account of the temple at Uppsala notes that only the heads were offered. This practice is possibly supported by the archaeological record. At the temple-hall of Hofstaðir in northern Iceland, oxen were decapitated in seasonal rituals for many years and the heads displayed at the hall. Osteological analysis of the bones shows that the animals were killed with blows to the neck by axe or sword. This method was perhaps intended to produce the spectacle of a shower of arterial blood. Similar observations have been made at other sites such as the Viking Age birch stump found underneath the church at Frösön ("Freyr's island") in Jämtland, and a site of a possible cult-house in Borg in Östergötland. Both of these sites had a significant enrichment of skulls relative to other bones. It has been proposed that there was a widespread practice to offer the heads to the gods, whilst cooking the meat for the feast that followed. It has also been suggested that the number of skulls that a hall displayed would act as a status signal, indicating the size of the feast that could be hosted within.

The written sources speak of sacrifices made of prisoners of war; Roman descriptions of Germanic tribes sacrificing their defeated enemies to Mars or Mercury have a similarity with customs related to the cult of Óðinn in Old Norse religion. The Icelandic skáld Helgi Trausti mentions his killing an enemy as a sacrifice to Óðinn; Egils saga einhenda ok Ásmundar berserkjabana and Orkneyinga saga describe the sacrificing of captive enemies to Óðinn. In depositions of remains found near Uppland, most of the human bodies are of young males with healed bone trauma, a possible congruence with the sacrificed captives of war mentioned in the written corpus. In almost all instances, human sacrifices occurring in the context of the Old Norse texts are related to Óðinn. Criminals and slaves are the humans being sacrificed in the majority of cases which has been compared to modern executions. Scholars doubt the reliability of some claims of human sacrifice. In the case of Adam of Bremen's account of the sacrifices at Uppsala, for example, the author likely exaggerated about the sacrifices of humans to demonise Germanic religion. Similarly, the accuracy of the account of human sacrifice in Kjalnesinga saga has been doubted by some scholars.

=== Role of blood and stallar ===
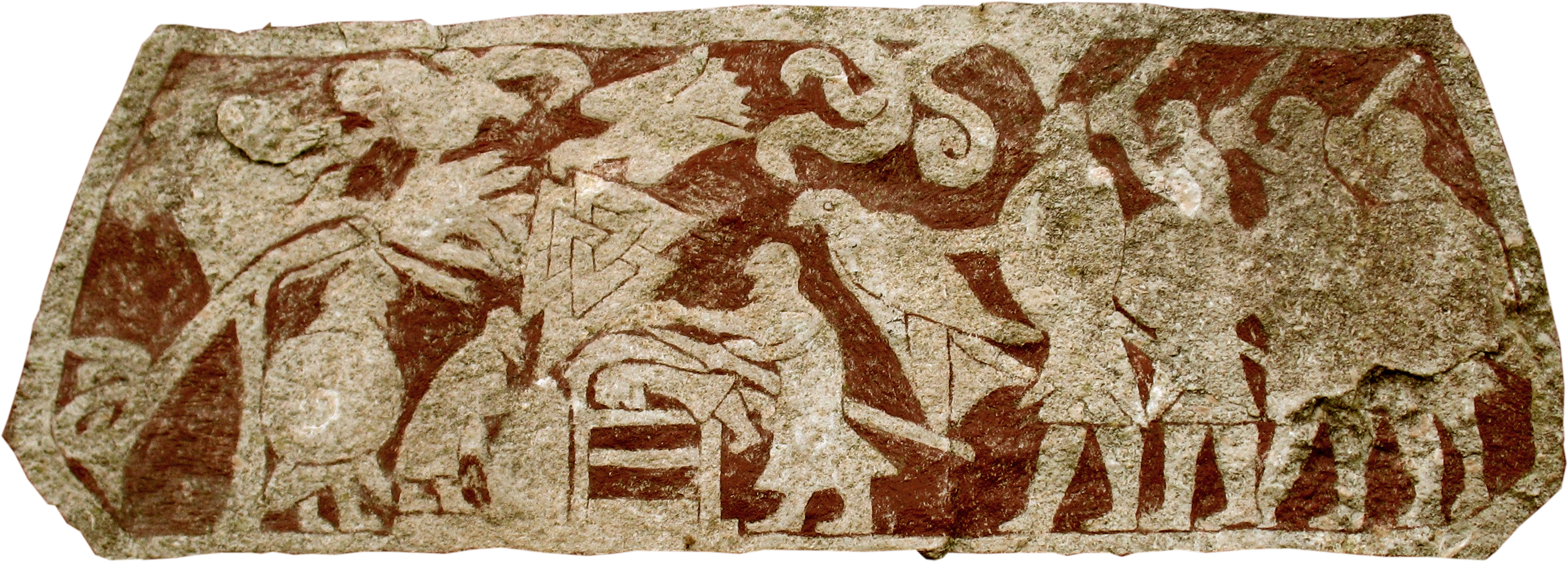
Detail from Stora Hammars I showing a man lying on his belly with another man using a weapon on his back. This has been proposed to depict a stallr (platform used in specific religious contexts).

In Hákonar saga góða, Snorri Sturluson describes hlautteinar ("sacrificial twigs") being used like sprinklers to spread blood over the stallar ("altars" or "platforms"), the walls of the hof (both inside and outside) and the people who were present there. It is possible that this description was influenced by the ecclesiastical ceremonies of the medieval church in which holy water was sprinkled over the congregation, or the account in the Old Testament, in which Moses sprinkles blood on his people. Snorri in his description explicitly notes the similarity between hlautteinar and stǫklar ("aspergillum"). Building on this, it has been proposed that the use of terms such as hlaut, hlautolli and hlautteinn to mean "sacrificial blood", "sacrificial twig" and "sacrificial bowl" respectively does not accurately reflect their use in pre-Christian times. This is partly based on the absence of the terms from Skaldic poetry and Eddic poems. Olof Sundqvist supports the idea that hlaut formerly had the meaning of "lot" in the context of divination.

While Klaus Düwel has taken this argument further, arguing that the sprinkling of sacrificial blood had no influence from heathen Germanic culture and was derived wholly from other sources such as the Old Testament, this has been challenged. The word stallar (corresponding to one of the places sprinkled with blood in Snorri's account), likely did have a meaning related to sacrifice in pre-Christian Scandinavian contexts. The phrase véstallr ("sacred stand") is found in Skaldic poetry and there are attestations of blood being smeared on holy objects elsewhere in Western Scandinavia. In Hyndluljóð, Freyja says about how one of her worshippers has made a hǫrgr ("altar") for her, faced with stone that was turned to glass and reddened with ox blood. Similarly, the U-version of Hervarar saga tells how a holy tree, referred to as a blóttre, is reddened with blood from a sacrificial horse. It is unclear if this is meant to be interpreted as a literal tree or as a platform or altar (véstallr, stallr or véstalli). In Ynglinga saga, the king Dómaldi is sacrificed to make their crops grow and they redden the stallar with his blood; Ynglingatal, the poem upon which this narrative is built, does not reference stallar but it does emphasise that the ground was reddened with blood. It has been suggested that the pouring of blood on the ground below stallar may be related to the taking of soil from below the stallr by Þórólfr from Norway to Iceland during the settlement of the island, as described in Eyrbyggja saga. Religious objects are recorded as being reddened with blood during blót, like oath-rings according to the Hauksbók version of Landnámabók. The practice of collecting sacrificial blood and pouring it on altars is well attested in other cultures such as in Ancient Greek and Roman religion and in Jewish burnt offerings.

Along with having a role in divination, other suggestions for the importance of blood in blót have been put forward by scholars. It has been put forward that the violence used to kill the animals found at Hofstaðir may have acted as a way to remove tensions in the community. Olof Sundqvist instead proposes that the blood was used in a performative setting, creating a feeling of spectacle and that the event was strongly separate from usual daily life. If true, those participating in the ceremony would likely have become emotionally engaged in the ritual drama. He further suggests, consistent with ideas by Bruce Lincoln, that there may have been a perceived connection between the killing during the blót and the killing of Ymir during the creation account told in Gylfaginning, which acted as its mythic counterpart. In this context, the bloodshed may have signalled a renewal of the world, in which conditions would improve for those who performed the blót.

=== Feasting and drinking ===
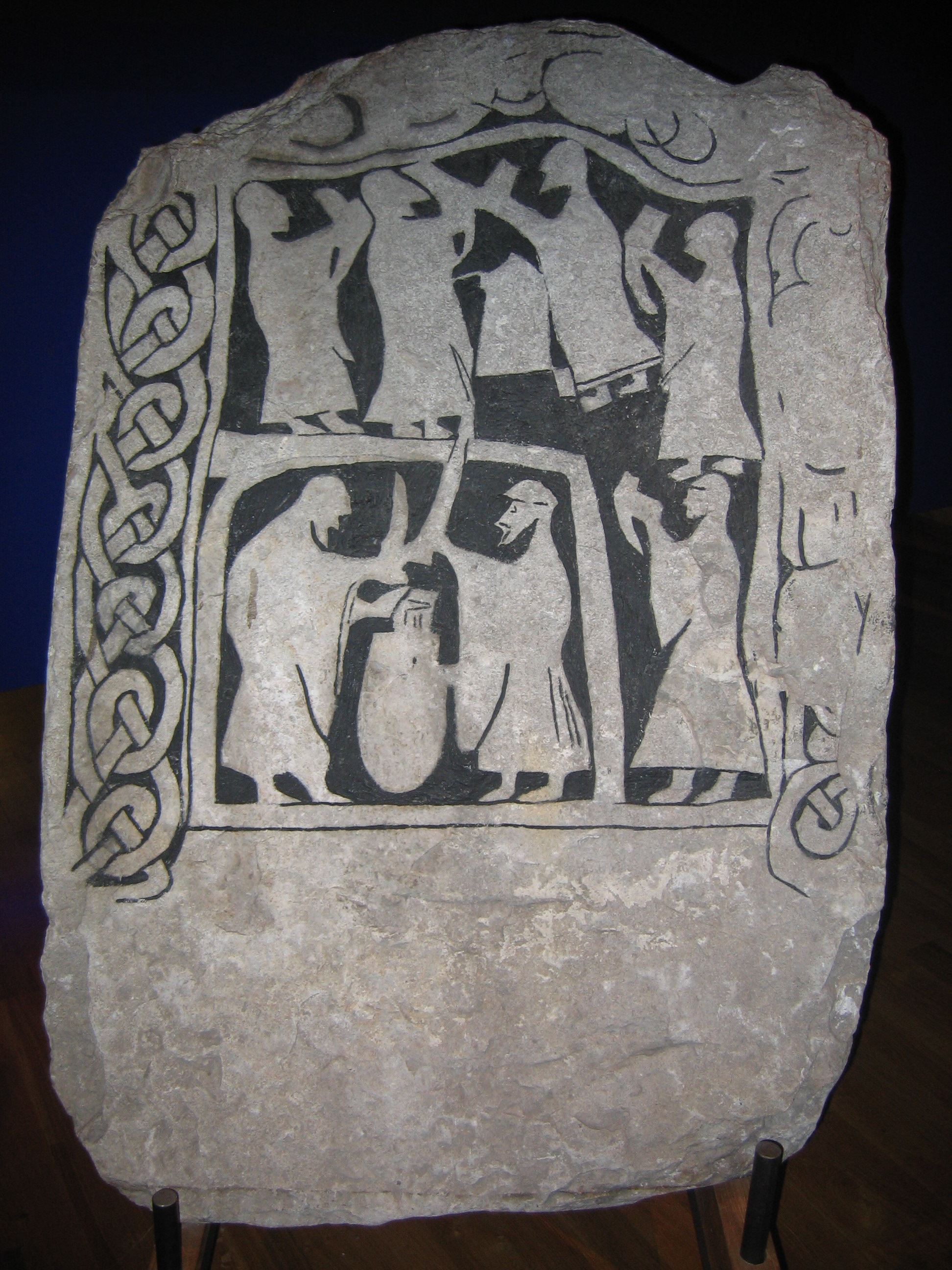
A drinking scene on an image stone from Gotland, Swedish Museum of National Antiquities, Stockholm

Sacrificial feasts (Old Norse: blótveizlur or blótdrykkjur) had a prominent place in the ancient religious practices of the Scandinavians, and were part of the seasonal festivals attended by large numbers of people. Family rituals such as the álfablót in western Sweden mentioned by the Norwegian skald Sigvatr Þórðarson in an early 11th-century poem, were usually performed on farm homesteads. Feasts and ritual drinking at blót are also mirrored in a mythological context in the depictions of Valhǫll in Hákonarmál.

Horses are often recorded as being eaten in blótveizlur and the eating of horsemeat was made an offence punishable by fines and outlawry by a number of medieval Scandinavian laws made after the adoption of Christianity, such as the Borgarthings-Lov, Den ældre Gulathings-Lov and the Frostathings-Lov. In Iceland, an exception was made for eating horsemeat in private for a short time after the establishment of Christianity but was later repealed.

The ritual killing of animals was followed by feasts on the meat, as described in the Eddic and Scaldic poetry, the Icelandic sagas, and on rune stones. The meat was boiled in large cooking pits with heated stones, either indoors or outdoors, and ale or mead was drunk in the ceremony.

Sites suggesting religious feasting have been found in Scandinavia such as in Melhus where many cooking pits, mainly dating to between 900 and 1300 CE, were found containing bones of domesticated animals. The hearths in hall-room C at Borg in Lofoten has also been suggested to have been the site of ritual cooking of meat from sacrificed animals. One large pit measuring around 6 m by 3 m has been interpreted as a seyðir (a cooking pit intended for ritual preparation of meat). The Old Gutnish cognate term is found as a prefix in Guta saga, which describes those who partook in blót together as suþnautar ("boiling companions") as they cooked their meals made from sacrificed animals together. Seyðir and suþ- are likely both related to Gothic: sauþs ("sacrifice").

=== Function ===
More than just a simple sacrifice, blót was central to all the ritual activities that took place in Norse sacral structures.

==== Help from the gods ====
Bulls have been noted to have been often sacrificed when seeking help from the gods in legal matters. Blót are also often described as being performed to achieve good harvests, with some texts explicitly recording that they are held til árs ok friðar ("for a good harvest and peace"). The rituals are suggested to be effective by some sources such as Fagrskinna, which notes that Hákon Sigurðarson restored the holy sites that had been damaged by Christians and made more blót than before and soon a period of prosperity followed, with a greater grain harvest and abundance of herring. This has been argued to show an ideology that a legitimate ruler must protect holy places and uphold blót so as to maintain a good relationship with the gods, in turn leading to the good fortunes of the people.

==== Divination ====
Divination is suggested to have occurred at some blót and is recorded in Ynglinga saga in connection to a sonarblót ("boar sacrifice"). This is not accepted universally by scholars, with Düwel arguing the link is only seen in Snorri's works. The link has been proposed to be seen elsewhere though, such as the compound word blótspánn ("chip used in divination").

According to Eyrbyggja saga, Þórólf Mostrarskeggi made preparations for his settlement of Iceland by performing a blót before he left Norway:

Þórólfr Mostrarskegg fekk at blóti miklu ok gekk til fréttar við Þór, ástvin sinn, hvárt hann skyldi sættast við konung eða fara af landi brott ok leita sér annarra forlaga, en fréttin vísaði Þórólfi til Íslandi.

Translation:

Þórólfr Mostrarskeggi prepared a great sacrifice and enquired of Thór, his beloved friend, whether he should be reconciled with the king or leave the country to seek a new destiny for himself; and the answer directed Þórólfr to Iceland.

According to the Sturlubók and Hauksbók versions of Landnámabók, a man named Ingólf prepared to settle in Iceland with his brother Hjörleif by performing a blót in a similar way to Þórólf:

Þenna vetr fekk Ingólfr at blóti miklu ok leitaði sér heilla um forlög sín, en Hjörleifr vildi aldri blóta. Fréttin vísaði Ingólfi til Íslands.

Translation:

That winter Ingólfr prepared a great sacrifice and sought omens for his destiny, but Hjorleifr would never sacrifice. The answer directed Ingólfr to Iceland.

Hjörleif was later killed by his thralls which Ingólf attributed to his refusal to uphold heathen customs. The book later states that no one dared live where Hjörleif had settled for fear of the landvættir.

==== Legitimisation of rulers ====
The holding of blót and associated feasts were an opportunity for rulers to demonstrate their wealth and generosity and praise of these traits is recorded in sources such as the skaldic poem Sigurðardrápa. Giving of gifts at feasts, such as rings, is well attested in Germanic texts such as Egils saga and Beowulf and has been proposed to have been a central practice in building loyalty to the king and strengthening authority. Displaying of heads of eaten animals may have created a degree of competition between communities and played into the wider strategy of rulership in Viking Age Iceland.

== Religious and cultic leaders ==
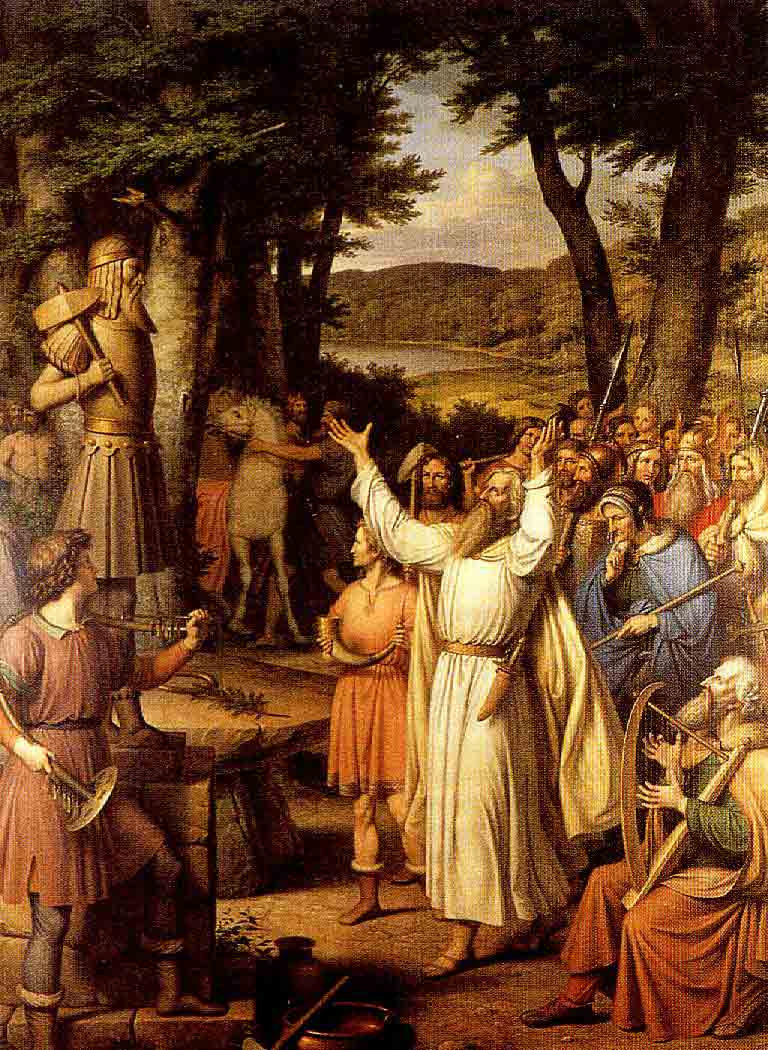
A painting of a goði leading the people in sacrificing to an idol of Thor by J. L. Lund

Scholars have debated the concept of religious leaders in Late Iron Age Scandinavia, with some such as Folke Ström supporting the idea that there was no professional priesthood and that rulers instead held this role. While this remains debated by scholars, there is no strong evidence for formal training into religious role whilst the organisation of sanctuaries and blót by elites is well attested in Old Norse texts.

Certain elites are highlighted for their participation in blót such as Sigurðr Hlaðajarl who is called inn mesti blótmaðr ("the most ardent heathen worshipper") and is described as having maintained all the sacrificial feasts in Trøndelag on behalf of the king. This concept is also attested on the Stentoften stone which records that a man named HaþuwulfR, likely a local ruler, held a blót to give a good harvest. In Iceland, goðar ("chieftains") are often recorded as leading public religious activities including blót.

Sources further describe how in both Norway and Svetjud, taking part in public blót was required for the ruler to be accepted by their subjects. Hákonar saga góða tells how the Christian King Hákon came to Trøndelag and did not want to take part in the blót, upsetting the local farmers and chieftains. At the Frostaþing he was asked to partake in them as his father had done and he was later strongly pressured to eat horse liver at a blótveizla ("sacrificial feast") in Mære. Similarly, the heathen king Blótsveinn took part in a horse sacrifice and ate horsemeat when becoming king of the Svear according to Hervarar saga ok Heiðreks. The U-version of this saga further tells how Blótsveinn became king after his brother-in-law, Ingi, refused to uphold the old customs due to him being Christian and was thus driven away by the Svear to Västergötland. This closely resembles Adam of Bremen's description of king Anunder who was also driven out for refusing to uphold the performing of blót.

There is evidence of blót being led by women such as the húsfreyja ("housewife") in Vǫlsa þáttr and possibly the húsfreyja who is also mentioned as holding álfablót in Austrfararvísur. Whilst absent from detailed accounts such as those in Hákonar saga góða, this is consistent with a wider Germanic context of some women playing central roles in ceremonies, the holding of feasts and running of the farm. This is attested in written sources such as Beowulf, Egils saga and the Hassmyra Runestone and is potentially also represented in the archaeological record in high status female burials.

== Calendrical blót ==
=== Yearly ===
==== Beginning of winter ====
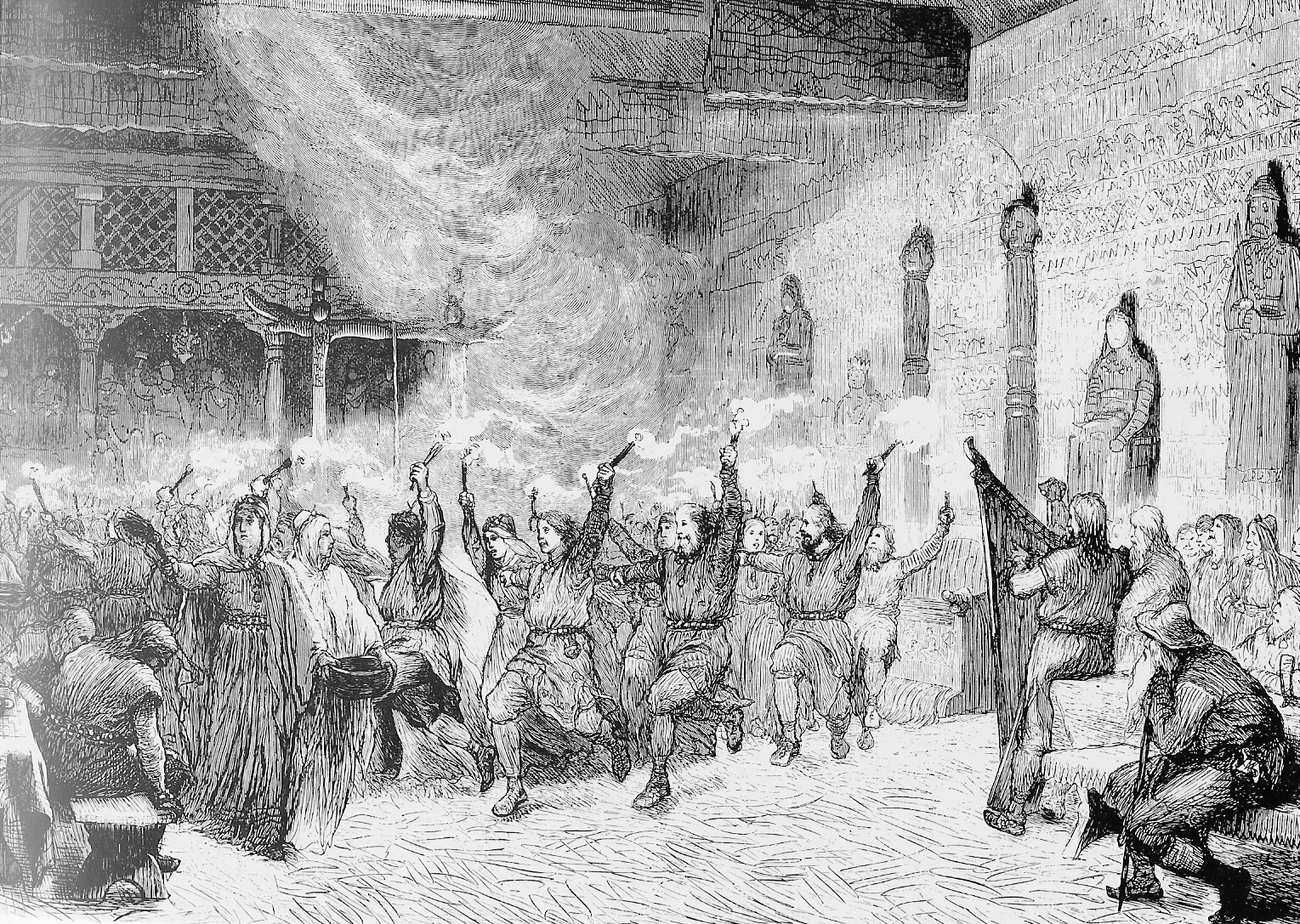
The Dísablót, by August Malmström (1829–1902)

Blót taking place at the beginning of winter in Norway and Iceland to celebrate vetrnætr ("winter-nights") are recorded in multiple sources, such as Gísla saga Súrssonar, in which the goði Þorgrímr Þorsteinsson sacrifices to Freyr during the feast. This time has been suggested to have marked the beginning of the new year and may be the same as the dísablót, named for the disir, which is recorded in Ynglinga saga as having taken place in Uppsala. Two further blót are attested as having taken place in Scandinavia, each in a single source. Völsa þáttr, preserved in Flateyjarbók, describes a family in Northern Norway at the beginning of the 11th century CE in which blót are performed each night in the autumn to the preserved penis of a horse that had been previously killed. An álfablót is recorded as having taken place in autumn in Svetjud in Austrfaravísur, written around 1020 CE.

In Anglo-Saxon contexts, blót are recorded as occurring in Blōtmōnaþ, a month in the Old English calendar which roughly corresponds to the Gregorian month of November.

==== Later in winter ====
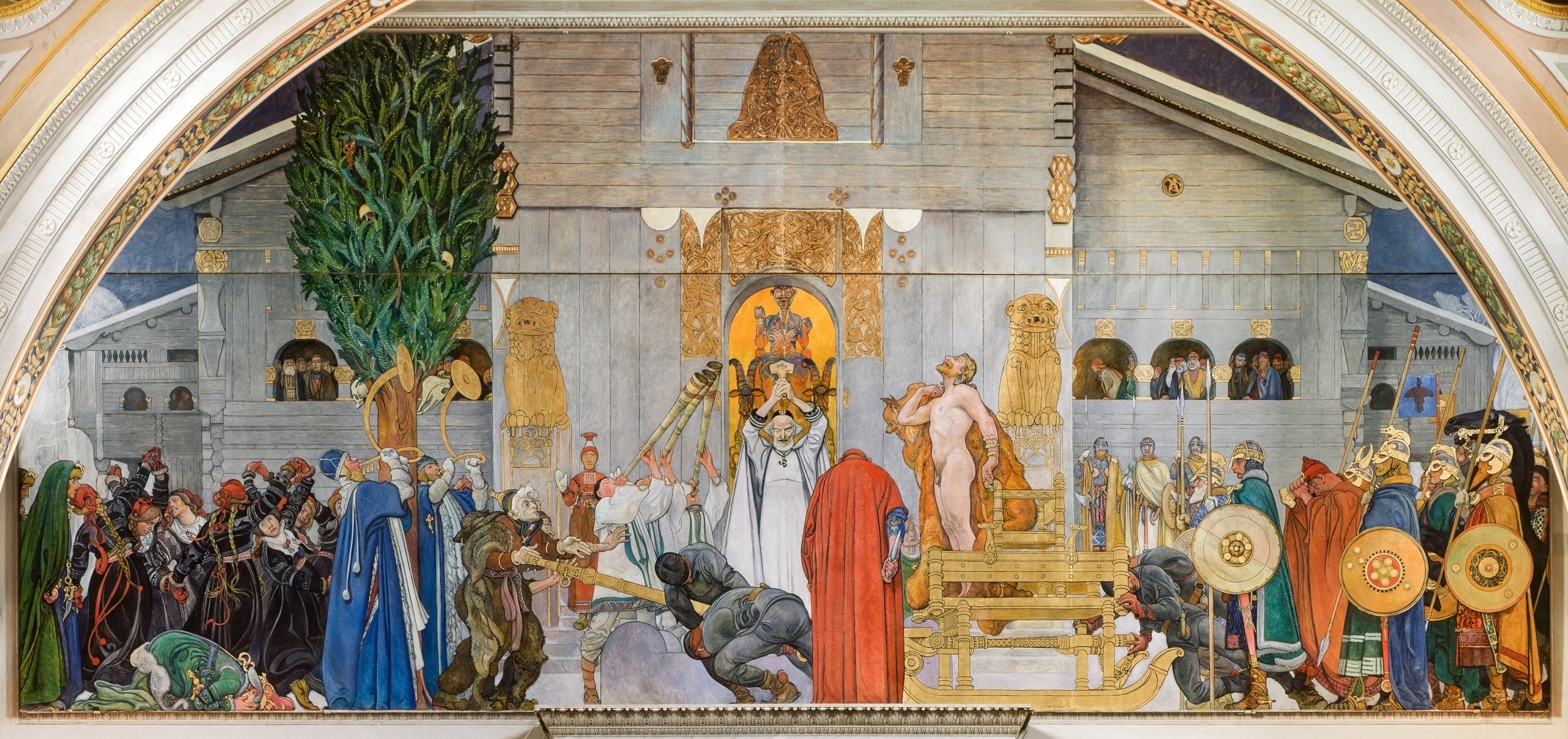
Carl Larsson's Midvinterblot ("Midwinter blót) depicts the legendary king Domalde offering himself as a sacrifice to prevent famine.

Other blót are also recorded as having taken place in winter, such as the miðsvetrarblót in Trøndelag recorded in Heimskringla. Yule was celebrated in the middle of winter and had a diversity of religious components such as the performing of blót and heitstrengingar. The Þorrablót was held at midwinter in the month of Þorri. The Orkneyinga saga tells in an aetiological story that the blót got its name from the son of King Snær who held a blót every year at this time but it is more likely it got its name from the month.

==== Summer ====
Óláfs saga Tryggvasonar mentions a miðsumarsblót ("midsummer sacrifice") at Mære. Furthermore, Ynglinga saga describes how Odin instituted three festivals in Sweden, one of which was the sigrblót ("sacrifice for victory"), which was to take place at the start of summer.

==== Other ====
Saxo Grammaticus's Gesta Danorum tells how Hadding, after having his fleet destroyed in a storm began sacrificing dark-coloured victims to Frey to regain his favourof the gods. The sacrifice was repeated yearly, being called by the Swedes the Frøblot

=== Every nine years ===
==== Lejre ====
Thietmar of Merseburg wrote in his chronicle, dated to the early 11th century CE, that the Danes had their main cult centre on Zealand at Lejre and gathered there every nine years and held a large sacrifice:

Latin text	Warner translation
Sed quia ego de hostiis eorundem antiquis mira audivi, haec indiscussa praeterire nolo. Eit unus in his partibus locus, caput istius regni, Lederun nomine, in pago qui Selon dicitur, ubi post VIIII, annos mense Ianuario post hoc tempus, quo nos theophaniam domini celebramus, omnes convenerunt et ibi diis suismet LXXXX et VIIII. homines et totidem equos, cum canibus et gallis pro accipitribus oblatis immolant, pro certo, ut praedixi, putantes, hos eisdem apud inseros fervituros et commissa crimina apud eosdem placaturos. Quam bene Rex noster fecit, qui eos a tam execrando ritu prolhibuit!	Because I have heard marvellous things about their ancient sacrifices, I will not allow these to pass by unmentioned. In those parts, the centre of the kingdom is a place called Leire, in the region of Seeland. Every nine years, in the month of January, after the day on which we celebrate the appearance of the Lord [6 January], they all convene here and offer their gods a burnt offering of ninety-nine human beings and as many horses, along with dogs and cocks – the latter being used in place of hawks. As I have said, they were convinced that these would do service for them with those who dwell beneath the earth and ensure their forgiveness for any misdeeds. Our king did well when he forbade them to practise such an execrable rite.

It has been noted that at the time of Thietmar's writing, Denmark had been nominally Christian for nearly 50 years and it is unlikely that large scale blót were still being performed at the end of the 10th century in Lejre. It has been further noted that Thietmar was determined to show the heathen Danes as being as ferocious and backward as possible, using large numbers to show their barbarity. He further potentially based his description on existing literature available to him, which formed part of a long tradition of supposing that heathens in general commonly sacrificed humans. Such sources would have allowed him to further dehumanise the Danish heathen population and depict them as evil.

==== Uppsala ====
The chronicler Adam of Bremen has described a blót being performed every 9 years at Temple at Uppsala in Sweden in Gesta Hammaburgensis ecclesiae pontificum, written in the mid 11th century CE:

Latin text	Tschan translation
Omnibus itaque diis suis attributos habent sacerdotes, qui sacrificia populi offerant. Si pestis et famis imminet, Tbor ydolo lybatur, si bellum, Wodani, si nuptiae celebrandae sunt, Fricconi. Solet quoque post novem annos communis omnium Sueoniae provintiarum sollempnitas in Ubsola celebrari. Ad quam videlicet sollempnitatem nulli praestatur immunitas. Reges et populi, omnes et singuli sua dona tramsmittunt ad Ubsolam, et quod omni poena crudelius est, illi qui iam induerunt christianitatem, ab illis se redimunt cerimoniis. Sacriticium itaque tale est. Ex omni animante, quod masculinum est, novem capita offeruntur, quorum sanguine deos placari mos est. Corpora autem suspenduntur in lucum, oui proximus est templo. Is enim lucus tam sacer est gentilibus, ut singulae arbores eius ex morte vel tabo immolatorum divinae credantur. Ibi etiam canes et equi pendent cum hominibus... Ceterum neniae, quae in eiusmodi ritu libationis fieri solent, multiplices et inhonestae ideoque melius reticendae.	For all their gods there are appointed priests to offer sacrifices for the people. If plague and famine threaten, a libation is poured to the idol Thor; if war, to Wotan; if marriages are to be celebrated, to Frikko. It is customary also to solemnize in Uppsala, at nine-year intervals, a general feast of all the provinces of Sweden. From attendance at this festival no one is exempted. Kings and people all and singly send their gifts to Uppsala and, what is more distressing than any kind of punishment, those who have already adopted Christianity redeem themselves through these ceremonies. The sacrifice is of this nature: of every living thing that is male, they offer nine heads, with the blood of which it is customary to placate gods of this sort. The bodies they hang in the sacred grove that adjoins the temple. Now this grove is so sacred in the eyes of the heathen that each and every tree in it is believed divine because of the death or putrefaction of the victims. Even dogs and horses hang there with men... Furthermore, the incantations customarily chanted in the ritual of a sacrifice of this kind are manifold and unseemly; therefore, it is better to keep silence about them.

Rudolf Simek has argued that Adam of Bremen had a strong motive in his work to present both that a Christian mission to Scandinavia would be successful, while also emphasising the urgency as the heathens were still supposedly performing what he perceived as evil practices, such as performing blood sacrifices to idols. He proposes that he likely drew on accounts such as Thietmar of Merseburg's chronicle and this could have been the source of certain details such as it recurring every nine years, although the possibility does remain that similar sacrifices were held at both religious sites. Despite this, he argues there that the account is still informed by reliable sources and notable details are not found in sources that he would have had access to, such as the hanging of the sacrificed in trees.

== Reception by medieval Christians ==
=== Blót strengthening evil spirits ===
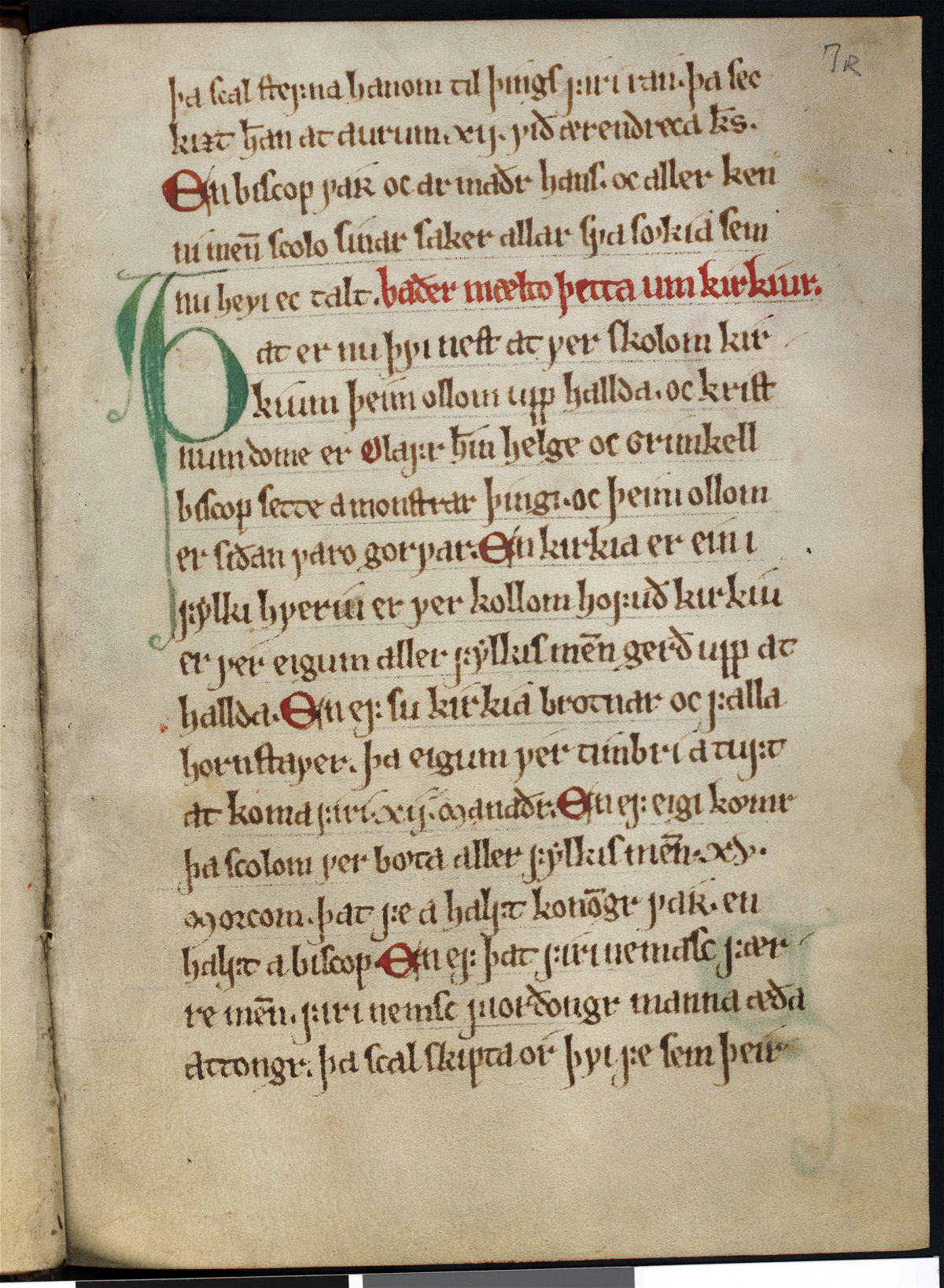
A page of the Older Gulaþing Law from Codex Rantzovianus, which lists holding blót as a punishable offence

Several conversion þættir, short stories concerned with reconciling Christian doctrine and heathen beliefs, present blót as harmful practices that, whilst effective in bringing benefits to the community that performs them, function by empowering evil spirits that pose as the helpful beings in which the heathens believe.

The conversion þáttr Óláfs þáttr Geirstaðaálfs gives an account of Óláfr digrbeinn, a king who the author says predicted his own death and warned his people not to perform blót to him after he dies, claiming that doing so turns the dead into trolls. Following this, Óláfr explains that these demons can bring good harvests but are also harmful. After his death, bad harvests occur and the people ignore his requests and worship him, calling him "Geirstaðaálfr" ("the elf of Geirstad"). Shortly after this, the harvests improve though when they stop their blót, the evil spirits that were receiving the gifts become angered. It has been proposed that this tale is the result of the author imperfectly trying to combine the ideas of Christian demonology and "the noble heathen", who is meant to maintain his dignity after death.

Similarly in another conversion þáttr, Ögmundar þáttr dytts, the author equates Freyr and the devil and explains that the constant offerings to the carving of Freyr have given the devil the ability to speak through it so as to strengthen their belief in Freyr. Later in the tale, Óláfr Tryggvason spiritually helps a Norwegian named Gunnar in defeating the devil, driving it out of the wooden carving. Gunnar then pretends to be Freyr, putting on the clothes of the cult image and accepting offerings of valuable gifts from the worshippers of the god, who stop sacrificing animals from then on.

=== Banning and suppression ===
The Anglo-Saxon Penitential of Theodore imposes 1–10 years of penance for those qui immolant demonibus ("who sacrifice to demons"). In this context, "demons" would likely have been used to refer to heathen gods and other beings connected to the cult, given that these were commonly equated in Christian thought. The penitential further prohibits the eating of food offered in sacrifices to the recipient being. Similar prohibitions are seen throughout later law codes in England such as the laws of King Wihtred of Kent. In Norðhymbra preosta lagu, blót are explicitly forbidden along with other practices deemed heathen such as idol-worship, with those caught performing them being made to pay 5 half-marks to the Church and 5 to the king.

Early Norwegian law codes explicitly forbid performing of blót, making it a punishable offence. The Older Gulaþing Law, dating to around the mid 11th century CE, bans performing of blót to heathen gods, howes or hǫrgar, listing it an offence for which the punishment is a fine, penance and if this is not followed, expulsion from the land. This is built upon in the ecclesiastical Law of Sverrir Sigurðarson, which further forbids blót to heathen vættir, and is consistent with the Frostaþing law which likewise bans blót. When Christianity was adopted as the main religion of Iceland, blót were allowed for a short time, as long as they were performed in private, with the punishment being lesser outlawry if they were observed publicly. This exception was soon repealed and the practice was fully banned.

The Af blotan section of Gutalagen, the legal code for Gotland, imposes fines for those who perform blót, along with those who follow heathen customs more widely. It further specifies that it is forbidden to make invocations with food or drink if they are not following Christian customs. In Sweden, the Upplandslagen forbade veneration of groves and stones, and sacrificing to affguþum ("idols").

=== Incorporation into Christian culture ===
Upon adoption of Christianity by the elite, ritual drinking at blót was sometimes blended with the incoming traditions, as recorded in the late 12th-century history of the kings of Norway Ágrip when King Óláfr Tryggvason:

...felldi blót ok blótdrykkjur, ok lét í stað koma í vild við lýðinn hátíðardrykkjur jól ok páskar, Jóansmessu mungát, ok haustöl at Mikjálsmessu.

Translation:

...abolished pagan feasts and sacrifices, in place of which, as a favour to the people, he ordained the holiday feasts Yule and Easter, St John's Mass ale, and an autumn-ale at Michaelmas.

This process of incorporating pre-existing heathen traditions into Christian traditions is likely also seen with the ritual formula til árs ok friðar ("for good harvest and peace"). In Hákonar saga góða it is used as part of Njörðr's and Freyr's toast, while other sources record it being used in a Christian context. Den ældre Gulathings-Lov, for example, states that the beer drunk during All Saints' Day and Christmas should be consecrated to thank Christ and Mary til árs. oc til friðar ("For property and peace").

== Modern period ==
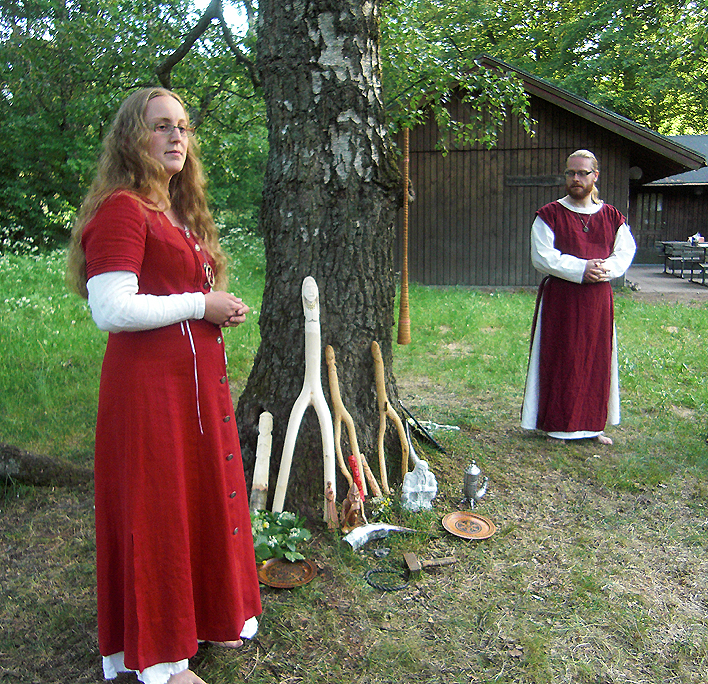
Council gyðja and goði of Samfundet Forn Sed Sverige hallowing the blót at the annual Thing in June 2011.

After the banning of blót by church officials, the giving of food and drink to beings believed to inhabit the landscape continued as part of local folk practices. This includes the offering to house spirits such as tomter in Sweden which is recorded throughout history such as in medieval criticisms by individuals such as heliga Birgitta and Olaus Magnus and folktales as late as the 20th century. Further, the blót at Yule may be the origin of the practice in Orkney recorded in the 18th century by which each family in Sandwick that rears pigs would slaughter one sow on the 17th of December which was known as Sow Day. A similar practice is recorded in the 19th century in which each household on North Ronaldsay slaughtered a sheep known as the Yule sheep on Christmas Eve.

Reconstructionist adherents of contemporary Germanic paganism have developed traditions of blót rituals celebrated in a contemporary context since the 1970s. In these practices, animal sacrifice is usually replaced with offerings of food or drink, although there remains a large focus on sharing food and strengthening relationships.

== See also ==
- Eucharist, a Christian rite involving eating and drinking
- Lác, an Old English word derived from a term for ritual
- Shechita, ritual slaughter in Judaism
- Qurban (Islamic ritual sacrifice)

== Bibliography ==
=== Primary ===
- Adam of Bremen (2002). History of the archbishops of Hamburg-Bremen. Translated by Tschan, Francis Joseph. New York: Columbia university press. ISBN 0231125747.
- Adam of Bremen (1876). Gesta Hammaburgensis ecclesiae pontificum. Hannoverae : Hahniani.
- Thietmar von Merseburg (1807). Chronicon;. Norimberg, Lechner.
- "Íslendingabók & Kristni Saga – The book of the Icelanders & The story of the conversion" (PDF). Viking society for northern research. Translated by Grønlie, Siân. 2006.
- Guta lag: the law of the Gotlanders. Translated by Peel, Christine. London: Viking Society for Northern Research, Univ. College London. 2009. ISBN 978-0-903521-79-6.
- Simensen, Erik (6 April 2021). Simensen, Erik (ed.). The Older Gulathing Law. Routledge. doi:10.4324/9781003134459. ISBN 978-1-003-13445-9. S2CID 233604491.
- Thorpe, Benjamin (2012). "Law of the Northumbrian priests". Ancient Laws and Institutes of England. Cambridge University Press. pp. 290–303. ISBN 9781139177412.
- Warner, David A. (1 January 2013). "The Chronicon of Thietmar of Merseburg". Ottonian Germany. Manchester University Press. pp. 65–385. doi:10.7765/9781526112774.00008. ISBN 978-1-5261-1277-4.
- "Eyrbyggja saga". heimskringla.no.
- "King Olaf Trygvason's saga". sacred-texts.com.
- "Landnámabók – Fyrsti hluti". heimskringla.no.

=== Secondary ===
- Aðalsteinsson, Jón Hnefill (1999). Jónsson, Jakob S. (ed.). Under the Cloak: A Pagan Ritual Turning Point in the Conversion of Iceland (2nd, extended ed.). University of Iceland Press. p. 16. ISBN 978-9979-54-380-0.
- Driscoll, Matthew James (2008). Ágrip Af Nóregskonungasqgum: A Twelfth-century Synoptic History of the Kings of Norway (PDF). Vol. x (2nd ed.). Viking Society for Northern Research. pp. 30–33. ISBN 978-0-903521-27-7.
- Gunnell, Terry (19 November 2018). "Part I: 6 Performance Studies". Handbook of Pre-Modern Nordic Memory Studies: Interdisciplinary Approaches. Walter de Gruyter GmbH & Co KG. ISBN 978-3-11-043136-0.
- Heinrichs, Anne (1994). "The Search for Identity: A Problem after the Conversion" (PDF). Alvissmál. 3.
- Hultgärd, Anders (2008). "The religion of the Vikings: Rituals and Worship". In Brink, Stefan; Price, Neil (eds.). The Viking World. Routledge. pp. 215–216. ISBN 978-1-134-31826-1.
- Kovárová, Lenka (2011). The Swine in Old Nordic Religion and Worldview. Háskóla Íslands (Thesis).
- Kroonen, Guus (2013). Etymological Dictionary of Proto-Germanic.
- Magnell, Ola; Iregren, E. (2010). "Veitstu hvé blóta skal? The Old Norse blót in the Light of Osteological Remains from Frösö Church, Jämtland, Sweden" (PDF). Current Swedish Archaeology. 18: 241. doi:10.37718/CSA.2010.14. S2CID 190714215.
- Magnell, Ola (2019). "Animals of Sacrifice: Animals and the Blót in the Old Norse Sources and Ritual Depositions of Animals of Sacrifice". In Wikström af Edholm, Klas; Rova, Peter Jackson; Nordberg, Andreas; Sundqvist, Olof; Zachrisson, Torun (eds.). Myth, Materiality and Lived Religion. Stockholm University Press. p. 303. doi:10.16993/bay. ISBN 978-91-7635-097-3. S2CID 195459479.
- Meyland, Nicolas (2013). "The (Re)conversion of the "Spirits of the Land" in Medieval Iceland". Revue de l'histoire des religions. 230 (3): 333–354.
- Nordberg, Andreas (2006). "Jul, disting och förkyrklig tideräkning". Acta Academiae Regiae Gustavi Adolphi. 91: 155–156. Archived from the original on 14 March 2023.
- Nygaard, Mathias Ephraim (3 April 2019). "Tomte Stories in Swedish Hälsingland: Place and Vernacular Religion". Folklore. 130 (2): 153–174. doi:10.1080/0015587X.2018.1556980. ISSN 0015-587X. S2CID 197848245.
- Orel, Vladimir (11 September 2003). A Handbook of Germanic Etymology. Brill. ISBN 978-90-04-12875-0.
- Price, Neil (2020). Children of Ash and Elm: A History of the Vikings. Basic Books. ISBN 978-0-465-09699-2.
- Rabinovitch, Shelley (2004). The Encyclopedia of Modern Witchcraft and Neo-Paganism. Citadel Press. ISBN 978-0-8065-2407-8.
- Sanmark, Alexandra (2004). Power and Conversion. A Comparative Study of Christianization in Scandinavia. The University of Uppsala.
- Santesson, Lillemor (1989). "En blekingsk blotinskrift : en nytolkning av inledningsraderna på Stentoftenstenen". Fornvännen: 221–229.
- Simek, Rudolf (2008). A Dictionary of Northern Mythology. Translated by Hall, Angela. BOYE6. ISBN 9780859915137.
- Simek, Rudolf (25 March 2022). "The Sanctuaries in Uppsala and Lejre and their Literary Antecedents". Religionsvidenskabeligt Tidsskrift (in Danish). 74 (74): 217–230. doi:10.7146/rt.v74i.132104. ISSN 1904-8181.
- Sundqvist, Olof (27 November 2015). "An Arena for Higher Powers: Ceremonial Buildings and Religious Strategies for Rulership in Late Iron Age Scandinavia". An Arena for Higher Powers. Brill. ISBN 978-90-04-30748-3.
- Wikström af Edholm, Klas (2019). "Finitude: Human and Animal Sacrifice in a Norse Setting: Response". In Wikström af Edholm, Klas; Rova, Peter Jackson; Nordberg, Andreas; Sundqvist, Olof; Zachrisson, Torun (eds.). Myth, Materiality and Lived Religion. Stockholm University Press. doi:10.16993/bay. ISBN 978-91-7635-097-3. S2CID 195459479.
- Zoëga, Geir (1910). A concise dictionary of old Icelandic. Oxford : Clarendon Press.
- Statistical Account, County of Orkney, Vol. XV. 1845. p. 110.
- Statistical Account, County of Orkney, Vol. XVI. 1795. p. 460.
- Tichy, Martin Rocek, Ondrej. "blót-mónaþ". Bosworth-Toller's Anglo-Saxon Dictionary online.
- Tichy, Martin Rocek, Ondrej. "ge-blót". Bosworth-Toller's Anglo-Saxon Dictionary online.
- "Old Norse Dictionary – Blót". Cleasby & Vigfusson – Old Norse Dictionary.
- "Old Norse Dictionary – Blót". Cleasby & Vigfusson – Old Norse Dictionary.
- "Old Icelandic Dictionary – Sigrblót". Old Icelandic Dictionary.
- "Religions: Heathenry". BBC.
