= Aslak =

Aslak is a Norwegian masculine given name derived from Old Norse Áslákr, which consists of áss (meaning "god"), and leikr (meaning "game"). The English surname Ashlock also ultimately originates from Áslákr. The Norwegian patronymic surname Aslaksen comes from Aslak; Aslakson is a variant of the surname. Oslac is a related Anglo-Saxon given name.

Notable people with the name include:

- Aslak Bolt, 15th-century Norwegian priest
  - Aslak Bolt's cadastre, a Norwegian cadastre of the Archdiocese of Nidaros
- Aslak Borgersrud, former member of the Norwegian rap group Gatas Parlament
- Aslak Brekke, Norwegian musician and vocalist
- Aslak Dørum, Norwegian musician and writer
- Aslak Falch, Norwegian footballer
- Aslak Fonn Witry, Norwegian footballer
- Aslak Hartberg, Norwegian rapper and bass player
- Aslak Hætta, Norwegian Sámi rebellion leader
- Aslak Nilsen, Norwegian politician
- Aslak Nore, Norwegian journalist, publisher and writer
- Aslak Reiersson Midhassel, Norwegian politician
- Aslak Sira Myhre, Norwegian culture administrator
- Aslak Torjusson, Norwegian educator
- Aslak Tveito, Norwegian scientist
- Aslak Versto, Norwegian politician
- Hans Aslak Guttorm, Finnish Northern Sámi teacher and author
- Nils-Aslak Valkeapää (Áilu, Áillohaš), Finnish-born Norwegian Sámi writer, musician and artist

== See also ==
- Aslak Lie Cabin, Springdale, Wisconsin, United States
- Aslaksen, Norwegian surname
- Aslakson
- Oslac, related Anglo-Saxon given name
