= Dweomer =

Dweomer may refer to:

- Dweomer (Dungeons & Dragons), the magical aura on an enchanted item in the Dungeons & Dragons role-playing game
- Dweomer, a city of magicians in the Fabled Lands game books
- Dweomer, a form of magic in the Deverry Cycle fantasy novels

== See also ==
- Dwemer, a race in The Elder Scrolls role-playing video games
- Dweomerlak (disambiguation)
