= Aslaksen =

Aslaksen is a Norwegian patronymic surname derived from the masculine given name Aslak. Aslakson is a variant of the surname. Notable people with the surname include:

- Elias Aslaksen, Norwegian Christian religious leader
- Erik Aslaksen, engineer and physicist
- Iulie Aslaksen, Norwegian economist

== See also ==
- Mons Aslaksen Somby, Norwegian Sámi rebellion leader
