= Oslac =

Óslác is a theophoric Anglo-Saxon given name, cognate to Old Norse Ásleikr/Áslákr (Latinised Ansleicus, modern Scandinavian Aslak) and to Old High German Ansleh (Anslech, Ansleccus). It is composed of ós "god" and lác "play, sport; offering, sacrifice".

Historical individuals bearing the name include:

- a son of Æthelfrith of Northumbria (recorded in MS E of the Anglo-Saxon Chronicle s.a. 617),
- king Oslac of Sussex (8th century),
- Oslac of Hampshire, butler of Æthelwulf of Wessex (9th century),
- earl Oslac of York (10th century),
- Anslech de Bricquebec (10th century).
- Ansleicus is the name of a Dane converted to Christianity in 864 according to the Miracles de St. Riquier. This Ansleicus subsequently mediated between Charles the Bald and the Viking invaders of Normandy.

The Norman French toponyms Anneville are from Anslecvilla "the farm of Ansleicus" and Annebecq too (cf. Norman patronymic Anlec still mentions in Jersey 1306 and in Hémévez around 1320).

The name is attested in a medieval runic inscription on a sword scabbard found in Tangen, Hedmark (the Korsøygarden sword, dated c. 1100), reading aumutær : geþemik : aø ͡slikæramik (normalized Old Norse Auðmundr gerði mik, Ásleikr á mik) "Audmund made me, Asleik owns me". As a given name, English Oslac unlike Norse Aslak is mostly extinct, but it survives into Modern English as a surname, besides Oslac also in the spellings Aslock, Ashlock, and Hasluck.

Based on the Anglo-Saxon, Old High German and Old Norse cognates of the name, Koegel (1894) assumes that the term *ansu-laikom may go back to Common Germanic times, denoting a Leich für die Götter, a hymn, dance or play for the gods in early Germanic paganism. Grimm (s.v. "Leich") compares the meaning of Greek χορός, denoting first the ceremonial procession to the sacrifice, but also ritual dance and hymns pertaining to religious ritual. Hermann (1906) identifies as such *ansulaikom the victory songs of the Batavi mercenaries serving under Gaius Julius Civilis after the victory over Quintus Petillius Cerialis in the Batavian rebellion of 69 (according to Tacitus), and also the "abominable song" to Wodan sung by the Lombards at their victory celebration in 579. The sacrificial animal was a goat, around whose head the Lombards danced in a circle while singing their victory hymn. As their Christian prisoners refused to "adore the goat", they were all killed (Hermann presumes) as an offering to Wodan.
