= Dweomerlak =

Dweomerlak (demerlaik, dwimmerlaik, of dweomer "illusion" and -lock) may refer to:

- a Middle English word for occult practices or magic
- a Rohirric word once used of the Witch-king of Angmar in The Lord of the Rings
