= Anneville =

Anneville (from Anslecvilla "the estate of Ansleicus") may refer to:

- In France:
  - Anneville-Ambourville, Seine-Maritime, Normandy
  - Anneville-sur-Scie, Seine-Maritime, Normandy
  - Anneville-en-Saire, Manche, Normandy
  - Anneville-sur-Mer, Manche, Normandy
- In the Netherlands:
  - Anneville (Ulvenhout), a country estate in Ulvenhout
- In the Republic of Ireland:
  - Anneville, County Clare, a townland in the civil parish of Killinaboy, barony of Inchiquin, County Clare
  - Anneville, County Laois, a townland in the civil parish of Shrule, barony of Slievemargy, County Laois
  - Anneville, County Meath (or Clonard Old), a townland in the civil parish of Clonard, barony of Upper Moyfenrath, County Meath
  - Anneville, County Westmeath (or Rathduff), a townland in the civil parish of Moylisker, barony of Fartullagh, County Westmeath

== See also ==
- Annoville
- Annville (disambiguation)
- Annéville-la-Prairie
