= Condé Nast Traveler =

American travel magazine (founded 1987)

- Cover of the September/October 2024 issue
- Global Editorial Director: Divia Thani
- Deputy Global Editorial Director and Head of Editorial Content, US: Jesse Ashlock
- Frequency: 8 issues per year
- Total circulation: 712,343 (2024)
- First issue: 1987; 39 years ago
- Company: Condé Nast
- Country: United States
- Based in: New York City
- Language: English
- Website: www.cntraveler.com
- ISSN: 0893-9683

Condé Nast Traveler is a luxury and lifestyle travel magazine published by Condé Nast. The magazine publishes across various international markets, covering hotels, restaurants, and other aspects of travel. It also releases rankings of countries to visit, luxury resorts, and other travel trends.

Condé Nast Traveler has won 25 National Magazine Awards. As of 2026, the magazine's website attracts more than four million monthly visits.

== History ==
The Condé Nast unit of Advance Publications purchased Signature, a magazine for Diners Club members, for $25 million in 1986. The company used it as the basis for Condé Nast Traveler, led by Sir Harold Evans (1928–2020) in 1987, with a focus on literary journalism and hard news reporting. As editor in chief, Evans coined the motto "Truth in Travel," which declared that travel industry freebies would not be accepted.

In 1995, Condé Nast Traveler's circulation was about 900,000, with hundreds of thousands of paid subscribers.

Since 2021, Condé Nast Traveler has been led by Global Editorial Director Divia Thani, who previously ran the magazine's Indian edition for 10 years. Based in London, she oversees eight editions of the brand worldwide. The magazine is produced at Condé Nast's U.S. headquarters at One World Trade Center in New York City. A separate U.K. edition, Condé Nast Traveller, is produced from Condé Nast's offices at The Adelphi in London.

== Controversy ==
In 2018, Condé Nast Traveler produced a series of videos officially titled Many People, Many Places, consisting of 13 videos. Over 70 people from 70 countries revealed how to say everyday phrases in their country of birth. The Filipino representative, an unidentified woman, counted numbers and money, sang Happy Birthday, and said "Cheers!" in English rather than Tagalog before stating that the Tagalog language lacked tongue twisters. Users complained the woman was not properly portraying Filipino culture in comparison to the other representatives. In response, Condé Nast Traveler responded in a Facebook post that "we appreciate your feedback and take seriously our responsibility to respectfully represent the many different aspects of the countries we cover at Condé Nast Traveler."
