= Hasluck =

Hasluck can refer to:

== People ==
- Alexandra Hasluck (1908–1993), author and social historian in Western Australia
- Frederick William Hasluck (1878-1920), English archaeologist
- Margaret Masson Hardie Hasluck (1885-1948), English archaeologist
- Paul Hasluck (1905-1993), Governor-General of Australia

== Places ==
- Division of Hasluck, an Australian electoral division

== See also ==
- Oslac (disambiguation)
