= Álfablót =

Sacrificial feast in Norse paganism

The álfablót (or the Elven sacrifice) is a pagan Scandinavian sacrifice to the elves towards the end of autumn, when the crops had been harvested and the animals were most fat. Unlike the great blóts at Uppsala and Mære, the álfablót was a local celebration at the homesteads that was mainly administered by the woman of the household. Nothing is known about the particular rites because they were surrounded by secrecy and strangers were not welcome to the homesteads during the celebrations. However, since the elves were collective powers with a close connection to ancestors and fertility, it is possible that the álfablót concerned ancestor worship and the life force of the family. It also appears that Odin was implied and that the master of the household was called Ǫlvir when administering the rites. The first element of Ǫlvir means "beer", which was an important element in Norse pagan sacrifices generally.

There is a notable account of the ceremony in Austrfararvísur by the Norwegian skald Sigvatr Þórðarson, where he tried to impose on the privacy of a series of homes during the sacred family holiday, a privacy that he was accordingly asked to respect.

== Austrfararvísur ==
In his skaldic poem Austrfararvísur, the Christian Norwegian skald Sigvatr Þórðarson gave a first hand account of his less than agreeable encounter with the holiday in Sweden. Sigvatr and his companions had been sent on a diplomatic mission to Skara in Västergötland and were to meet jarl Ragnvald Ulfsson, but they had not arrived at the destination yet and had to find night quarters.

After an arduous journey, Sigvatr and his companions arrived at a homestead called Hof, which probably is modern Stora Hov, near Edsvära in Västergötland. They expected to be received according to the laws of hospitality, but the door remained shut. Sigvatr had to stick his nose down into a narrow opening in order to present himself, but the people of the household declined by saying that the place was hallowed. Sigvatr retorted that the trolls should take them, and continued to the next homestead.

At the following farm, he met a lady who told him to go away and said "Don't go further inside unlucky man! We are afraid of Odin's wrath; we are pagans!" Then, she chased him away as if he were a wolf and said that they were having the elven sacrifice at the homestead.

They tried three more times to find a place to rest, but all the times they were dispatched by men who called themselves Ölvir. Then, they decided to seek out the man who was reputedly the most hospitable man in the district. The last man only scowled at them, and calling the man the "guardian of the pickaxe", Sigvatr stated that if that man was the "best man", the worst man must have been truly evil.

== Kormáks saga ==
In Kormáks saga, there is an account on how sacrifices were done to the elves in order to heal a battle wound. Unlike the sacrifices described by Sigvatr, this one appears to have been a sacrifice that could have been performed at any time of the year:

Hún segir: "Hóll einn er héðan skammt í brott er álfar búa í. Graðung þann er Kormákur drap skaltu fá og rjóða blóð graðungsins á hólinn utan en gera álfum veislu af slátrinu og mun þér batna."

"A hill there is," answered she, "not far away from here, where elves have their haunt. Now get you the bull that Cormac killed, and redden the outer side of the hill with its blood, and make a feast for the elves with its flesh. Then thou wilt be healed."
