= Ashlock =

Ashlock is an English surname derived from the masculine given name Aslak, ultimately from Old Norse Áslákr. Notable people with the surname include:

- Jesse Ashlock, American writer and journalist
- Pofele Ashlock, American football player

== See also ==
- Ashlock Formation, Kentucky, United States
