= Annville =

Annville can refer to a place in the United States:

- Annville, Kentucky, in Jackson County
- Annville Township, Pennsylvania, in Lebanon County
- Annsville, New York, in Oneida County

== See also ==
- Anneville (disambiguation)
