= Aslak Lie Cabin =

Historic house in Wisconsin, United States

- U.S. National Register of Historic Places
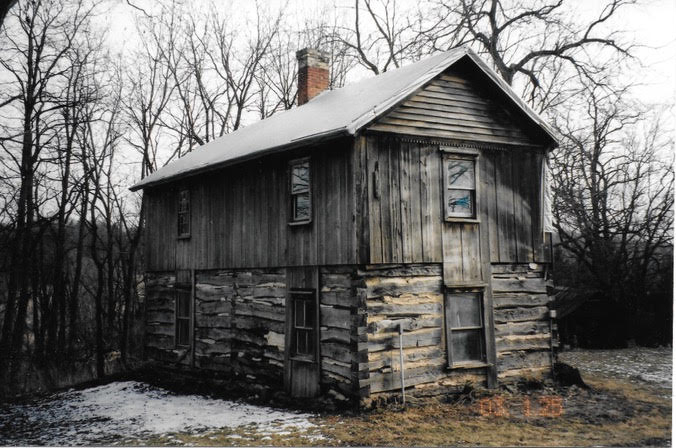
- On Aslak's farm, before disassembly in 2003
- Location: 3022 County Trunk P, Springdale, Wisconsin
- Coordinates: 43°01′14″N 89°40′05″W
- Area: 5 acres (2.0 ha)
- Built: 1849
- Architect: Aslak Lie
- NRHP reference No.: 86000622
- Added to NRHP: April 3, 1986

The Aslak Lie Cabin in Springdale, Wisconsin was built in 1848 by a Norwegian immigrant master craftsman who mixed traditional techniques from the old country with newer American ways of building. The cabin was listed on the National Register of Historic Places in 1986 and on the State Register of Historic Places in 1989.

== History ==
Aslak Oleson Lie was born in 1798 at Hofseie in Søndre Aurdal, Norway - born into a family of poor landless laborers who moved between farms every year or two. Aslak learned to read and write and became a corporal in a musketry corps. By 1820 he had established a reputation as a craftsman, and in 1828 carved the organ case for the Bagn Church. He also built furniture and he was an early experimenter in his Valdres region with veneer and designs with contrasting woods. In 1826 he married Marit Knudsdatter Dølven, a daughter of a wealthy landowner - a remarkable jump in social status.

The year he was married, Aslak built a small log house near Reinli - three rooms, one story, with a large corner fireplace in a living room/kitchen, with two small bedrooms. In 1837 he built another more modern house on land he owned himself, L-shaped with log walls covered with beaded vertical boards and a "shocking" diamond-shaped window in the gable. Inside, the room layout was unconventional for rural Norway at that time, but it had a sval, an exterior hallway connecting the rooms.

In 1848, at age 50, Aslak emigrated from Norway with his wife Marit, six children, and his brother and sister-in-law. In May they sailed out of Bergen with a shipload of others from their part of Norway and arrived in New York on June 28. They passed Koshkonong, the "Queen of Norwegian-American settlements," and came to western Dane County, where only a few Norwegians had settled at that time.

Aslak chose to build his cabin on a south-facing slope above a marsh that feeds the Sugar River. The basement may have started as a natural depression in the rock. It is said that Aslak and his brother lived in a dugout the first winter there, and the dugout may have been expanded into a basement by quarrying shelves and platforms from the natural rock.

Aslak built the first story in a Norwegian folk style: horizontal logs joined at the corners with chiseled dovetail joints, with cracks chinked with wood strips and probably mortar or clay. Especially on the inside he carefully created a smooth surface, leaving little need for plaster. The first story had two rooms divided by a log wall: a living room and a kitchen, probably with a wood-burning stove right from the start. Aslak installed traditional Norwegian double casement windows in the log first story. He built a 'sval' across the front of the house, just like his second house in Norway. And the diamond-shape from his house in Norway appears in the door panels of his house in Wisconsin.

The second story is quite different from the first. It may be that the oak logs of Dane County were harder to work with than Norwegian fir and spruce, so he adjusted his construction technique. Instead of logs, the second story is timber-framed in oak, then clad in vertical boards. The second-floor windows are American-style double-hung. The second story was divided into two rooms: a heated bedroom and a "cold storage room" where they kept food, clothes and furniture.

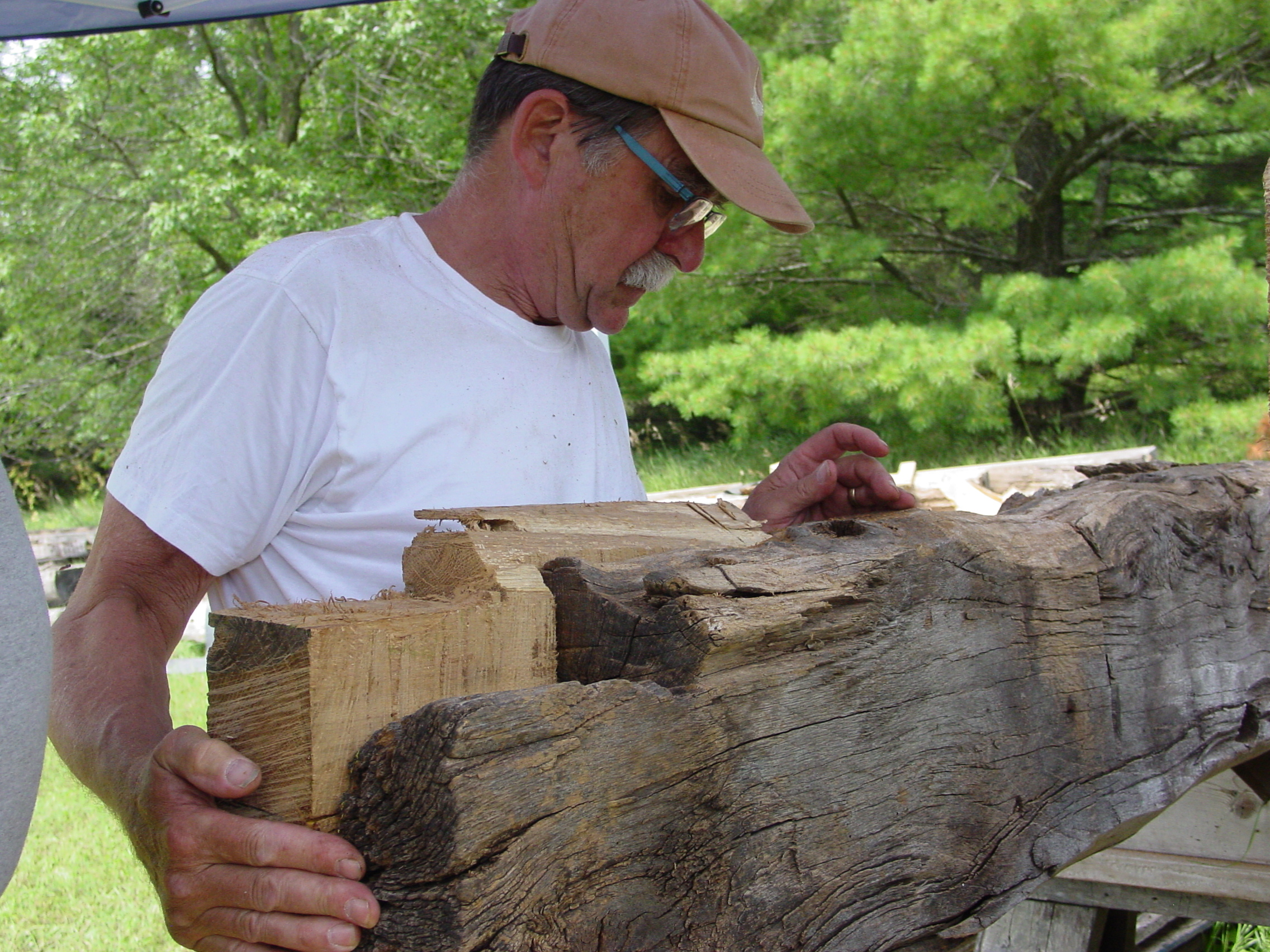
Sistering a splint onto an 1849 beam

Aslak was also a leader - not just a builder. Over the years he attracted other immigrants to the area, and helped them with gifts of clothing and food. He built houses and cabinets for many. He wrote for Norwegian-language Midwestern newspapers, and coordinated visits by clergy and Norwegian-American spokesmen. He helped found the three-point Lutheran parish at Perry, East Blue Mounds, and Springdale.

At age 80, Aslak and Marit moved to Buffalo County to live with their son Halvor, where he had founded a Norwegian-American settlement. Aslak was still active there in carpentry and church for a bit, but Marit died in 1881 and finally Aslak in 1886.

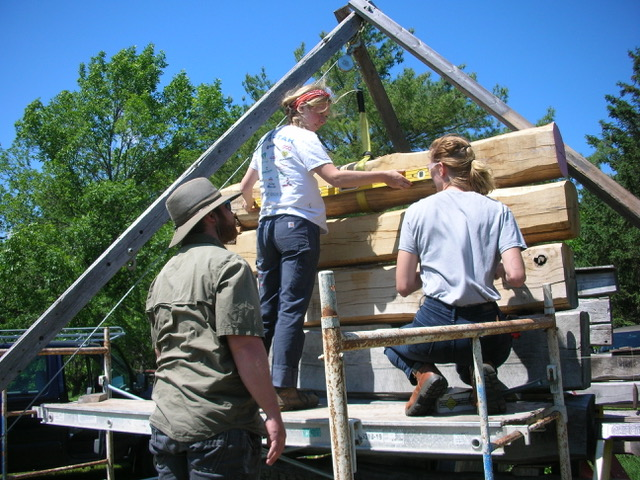
Reassembling the cabin in 2018

Aslak's house in Springdale was occupied until the 1960s, then sat empty for forty years. By 2002 it was deteriorating, so its owners donated it to the Folklore Village at Dodgeville. It was carefully documented, pieces labeled, disassembled, and moved. At Folklore Village the cabin is being restored and rebuilt.
