= Jesse Ashlock =

American writer and journalist

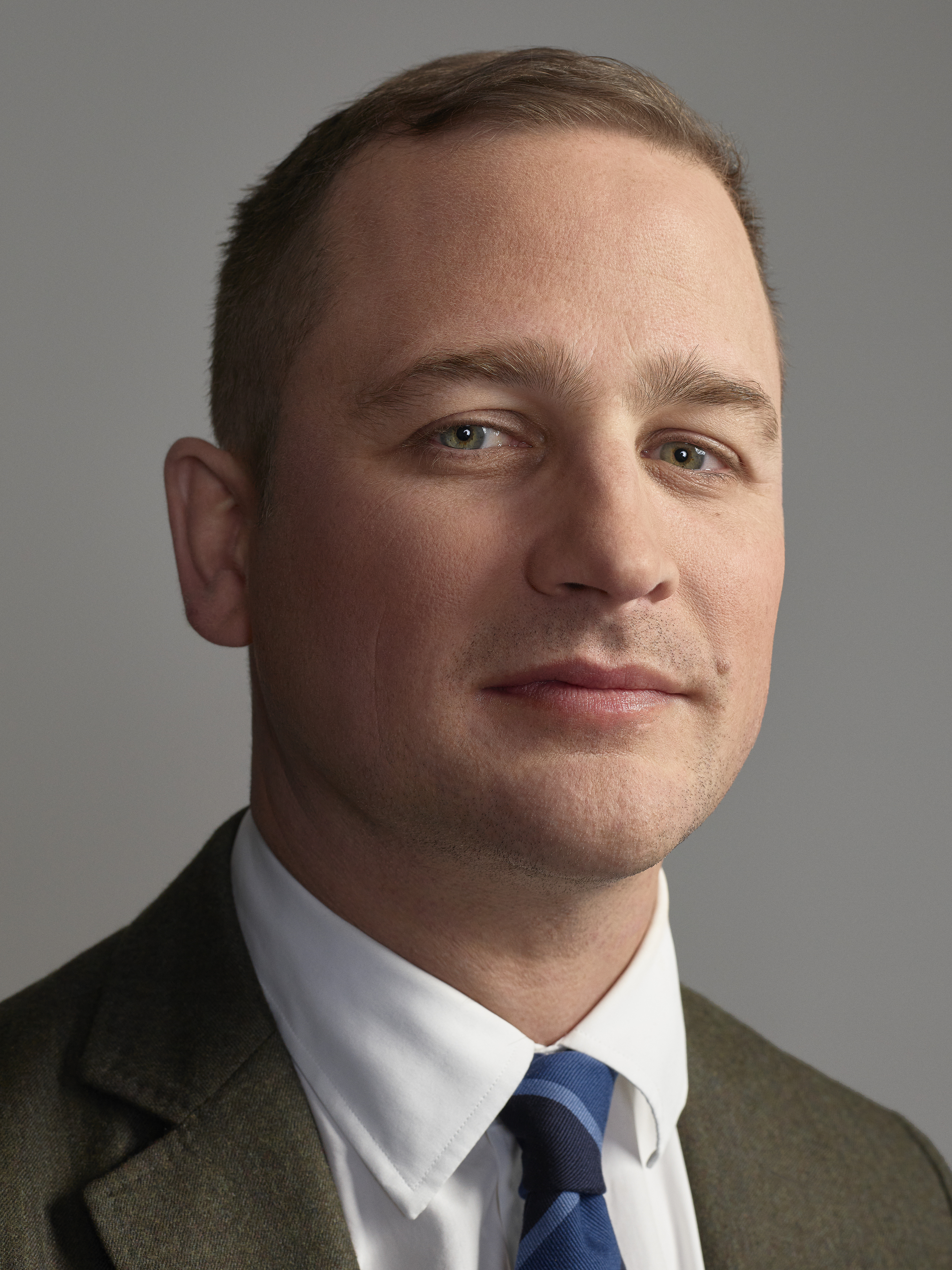
- Born: December 22, 1977 (age 48); New Haven, Connecticut, U.S.
- Education: Wesleyan University
- Occupations: Writer; journalist
- Children: 2

Jesse Ashlock (born December 22, 1977) is an American writer and journalist. He is the deputy global editorial director and head of editorial content in the US for Condé Nast Traveler.

== Professional life ==
During the 2000s, Ashlock held senior positions at I.D., Visionaire, the Tribeca Film Festival, and Palm Pictures. Between 2010 and 2013 he worked as deputy editor Condé Nast's Details.

From 2013 to 2014, Ashlock served as online director for T: The New York Times Style Magazine. After that, he joined Travel + Leisure, where he worked from 2014 to 2019 first as the magazine's featured editor, and then as executive editor.

Ashlock initially joined Condé Nast Traveler as US editor in September 2019, and in December 2020 he was promoted to deputy global editorial director.

He is an adjunct instructor at the Center for Publishing at NYU’s School for Professional Studies, where he sits on the board of directors.

== Personal life ==
Ashlock was born in New Haven, Connecticut, grew up in Northern California, and attended high school at The College Preparatory School in Oakland, CA. Ashlock attended Wesleyan University in Middletown, Connecticut, where he studied as an English major. He lives in Brooklyn, New York, with his wife and two children.
