= Austrfararvísur =

Skaldic poem written in 1019

Austrfararvísur (‘verses of an eastern journey’) is a skaldic poem composed by the Icelandic skald Sigvatr Þórðarson c. 1019. It is written in the meter dróttkvætt (‘courtly spoken’).

== Historical context ==
Sigvat was a court poet and trusted advisor of King Olaf Haraldson of Norway. He was sent with a diplomatic delegation to the court of King Olof of Sweden. The delegation was successful. Reconciliation was achieved between the two kings, sealed with engagement between Olaf II and the Swedish princess Astrid Olofsdotter of Sweden.

== Content ==
Austrfararvísur contains a humorous and sarcastic description of Sigvat's arduous journey to Svíþjóð, modern eastern Sweden. In one particularly memorable sequence, he describes how the men passed through Eidskogen into Västergötland, and reached a farm named Hof (for its identity see Fulk 2012, p. 589). The door was barred, and the people inside hostile; due to being Christian, Sigvat and his retinue were not welcome. According to the prose context and alluded to in the poem, Sigvat went on to ask for lodging at two other homesteads, but were likewise refused at each. The relevant verses (4-6) from the poem in Fulk's edition (pp. 589–592):

Réðk til Hofs at hœfa;
hurð vas aptr, en spurðumk
— inn settak nef nenninn
niðrlútt — fyrir útan.
Orð gatk fæst af fyrðum,
(flǫgð baðk) en þau sǫgðu
— hnekkðumk heiðnir rekkar —
heilagt (við þau deila).

I resolved to aim for Hof; the door was barred, but I made enquiries from outside; resolute, I stuck my down-bent nose in. I got very little response from the people, but they said [it was] holy; the heathen men drove me off; I bade the ogresses bandy words with them.

‘Gakkat inn,’ kvað ekkja,
‘armi drengr, en lengra;
hræðumk ek við Óðins
— erum heiðin vér — reiði.’
Rýgr kvazk inni eiga
óþekk, sús mér hnekkði,
alfablót, sem ulfi
ótvín, í bœ sínum.

‘Do not come any farther in, wretched fellow’, said the woman; ‘I fear the wrath of Óðinn; we are heathen.’ The disagreeable female, who drove me away like a wolf without hesitation, said they were holding a sacrifice to the elves inside her farmhouse.

Nú hafa hnekkt, þeirs hnakka
(heinflets) við mér settu,
(þeygi bella þollar)
þrír samnafnar (tíri).
Þó séumk hitt, at hlœðir
hafskíðs myni síðan
út, hverrs Ǫlvir heitir,
alls mest, reka gesti.

Now three namesakes have driven [me] away, they who turned their backs on me; not at all do the firs of the whetstone-platform [SWORD > MEN] display praiseworthiness. However, I fear this above all, that every loader of the ocean-ski [SHIP > SEAFARER] who is named Ǫlvir will henceforth chase strangers away.

== See also ==
- Ragnvald Ulfsson

== Editions and translations ==
- Fulk, R. D. (2012). "Austrfararvísur". In Whaley, Diana (ed.). Poetry from the Kings' Sagas 1: From Mythical Times to c. 1035. Skaldic Poetry of the Scandinavian Middle Ages 1. Turnhout: Brepols. p. 578. ISBN 978-2-503-51896-1.
- Om skalden Sighvat Thordsson och tolkning af hans Austrfararvísur, Vestrfararvísur och Knútsdrápa (author: Sighvatr Þórðarson; editor: Sven Alfred Ternström, publisher:Lund, H. Ohlssons boktryckeri, 1871. text in Old Norse with Swedish introduction, translation and notes)

== Other sources ==
- Jonsson, Finnur (1907) Den islandske litteraturs historie tilligemed den old norske (University of California Libraries)
- Lagerqvist, Lars O. (1982) Sverige och dess regenter under 1.000 år (Albert Bonniers Förlag AB) ISBN 91-0-075007-7
- Thunberg, Carl L. (2012) Att tolka Svitjod [To interpret Svitjod] (Göteborgs universitet CLTS) ISBN 978-91-981859-4-2, ISBN 978-91-637-5725-9
