= Folke Ström =

Swedish religious studies scholar

- Born: 15 October 1907; Eskilstuna, Sweden
- Died: 20 January 1996 (aged 88); Gothenburg, Sweden

Academic background
- Education: Stockholm University

Academic work
- Discipline: Religious studies
- Sub-discipline: Old Norse studies
- Institutions: Stockholm University; Lund University
- Main interests: Germanic religion

Stig Axel Folke Ström (15 October 1907 – 20 January 1996) was a Swedish religious studies scholar who specialized in the study of Germanic religion.

== Biography ==
Folke Ström was born in Eskilstuna, Sweden on 15 October 1907. the son of politician Fredrik Ström and author Tua Ström. He grew up in Stockholm. After graduating from high school, Ström studied ethnography, Nordic languages and religious history at Stockholm University. Among his teachers were Elias Wessén, Tor Andræ and Ernst Arbman. He gained his B.A. in 1936, and his Ph.D. in 1942. His doctoral thesis, On the Sacred Origin of the Germanic Death Penalties (1942). Ström's thesis was praised upon publication, and he was appointed a docent at Stockholm University in 1943. He was offered the position of professor at Lund University in 1943, but decided to continue his work at Stockholm. Since 1948, Ström was docent at the University of Gothenburg.

Ström specialized in the study of Germanic religion, particularly Old Norse religion. He wrote numerous influential studies on this subjects.

Ström retired in 1972. Ström died in Gothenburg, Sweden on 20 January 1996.

== Selected works ==
- On the Sacral Origin of the Germanic Death Penalties, 1942
- Den döendes makt och Odin i trädet, 1947
- Den egna kraftens män. En studie i forntida irreligiositet, 1948
- Diser, nornor, valkyrjor. Fruktbarhetskult och sakralt kungadöme i Norden, 1954
- Loki. Ein mythologisches problem, 1956
- Nordisk hedendom: tro och sed i förkristen tid, 1961

== See also ==
- Åke V. Ström
- Dag Strömbäck
- Geo Widengren
- Stig Wikander
- Anders Hultgård

== Sources ==
- Religionshistorikern Folke Ström. Acta Academiae Regiae Gustavi Adolphi (in Swedish). Vol. 157. Royal Gustavus Adolphus Academy. 2019. ISBN 978-91-87403-36-1.
