= -lock =

English language suffix

The suffix -lock in Modern English survives only in wedlock and bridelock. It descends from Old English -lāc, which was more productive, carrying a meaning of "action or proceeding, state of being, practice, ritual". As a noun, Old English lāc means "play, sport", deriving from an earlier meaning of "sacrificial ritual or hymn" (Proto-Germanic *laikaz). A putative term for a "hymn to the gods" (*ansu-laikaz) in early Germanic paganism is attested only as a personal name, Oslac.

== Suffix ==
The Old English nouns in -lāc include brýdlāc "nuptials" (from which the now obsolete bridelock), beadolāc, feohtlāc and heaðolāc "warfare", hǽmedlāc and wiflāc "sexual intercourse", réaflāc "robbery", wítelāc "punishment", wróhtlāc "calumny" besides the wedlāc "pledge-giving", also "nuptials" (from which wedlock). A few compounds appear only in Middle English, thus dweomerlak "occult practice, magic", ferlac "terror", shendlac "disgrace", treulac "faithfulness", wohlac "wooing", all of them extinct by the onset of Early Modern English. The earliest words taking the -lāc suffix were probably related to warfare, comparable to the -pleȝa (-play) suffix found in "swordplay".

The Old Norse counterpart is -leikr, loaned into North Midlands Middle English as -laik, in the Ormulum appearing as -leȝȝe. The suffix came to be used synonymously with -nesse, forming abstract nouns, e.g. clænleȝȝe "cleanness".

== Noun ==
The etymology of the suffix is the same as that of the noun lāc "play, sport", but also "sacrifice, offering", corresponding to obsolete Modern English lake (dialectal laik) "sport, fun, glee, game", cognate to Gothic laiks "dance", Old Norse leikr "game, sport" (origin of English lark "play, joke, folly") and Old High German leih "play, song, melody." Ultimately, the word descends from Proto-Germanic *laikaz. Old English lícian ("to please", Modern English like) is from the same root. In modern English, the noun has been reintroduced through the cognate Swedish lek as a specialist term referring to mating behavior.

Thus, the suffix originates as a second member in nominal compounds, and referred to "actions or proceedings, practice, ritual" identical with the noun lāc "play, sport, performance" (obsolete Modern English lake "fun, sport, glee", obsolete or dialectal Modern German leich).

Only found in Old English is the meaning of '(religious) offering, sacrifice, human sacrifice,' in Beowulf 1583f. of the Danes killed by Grendel, in Lambeth Homilies (c. 1175) of the sacrifice of Christ. In the Anglo-Saxon Gospel (c. 1000) in Matthew 8:4 for δωρον, denoting an offering according to Mosaic law. In the 13th century it appears to lose its religious connotations and denotes gifts more generally, of the offerings of the Three Magi (Ancrene Riwle 152, c. 1225), and in Genesis and Exodus (c. 1225, 1798) of the gifts sent by Jacob to Esau. From the 14th century, under the influence of to lake "to move quickly, to leap, to fight", the noun comes to mean "fun, sport" exclusively. In this meaning, it survives into the 19th century in North English dialect in the compound lake-lass "female playmate."

The word is also a compound member in given names, in Sigelac, Hygelac and Oslac.

Oslac has Scandinavian and continental cognates, Asleikr and Ansleih. Based on this, Koegel (1894) assumes that the term *ansu-laikaz may go back to Common Germanic times, denoting a Leich für die Götter, a hymn, dance or play for the gods in early Germanic paganism. Grimm (s.v. Leich) compares the meaning of Greek χορος, denoting first the ceremonial procession to the sacrifice, but also ritual dance and hymns pertaining to religious ritual.

Hermann (1928) identifies as such *ansulaikaz the hymns sung by the Germans to their god of war mentioned by Tacitus and the victory songs of the Batavi mercenaries serving under Gaius Julius Civilis after the victory over Quintus Petillius Cerialis in the Batavian rebellion of 69 AD, and also the "abominable song" to Wodan sung by the Lombards at their victory celebration in 579. The sacrificial animal was a goat, around whose head the Lombards danced in a circle while singing their victory hymn. As their Christian prisoners refused to "adore the goat", they were all killed (Hermann presumes) as an offering to Wodan.

== See also ==
- Hörgr
- Blót
