= Hans Aslak Guttorm =

Finnish author

- Born: Hans Aslak Guttorm; 15 December 1907
- Died: 24 March 1992 (aged 84); Outakoski, Finland

Hans Aslak Guttorm (15 December 1907 – 24 March 1992 in Outakoski, Finland) was a Northern Sámi teacher and author who wrote in Northern Sámi. He graduated as a teacher from Jyväskylä's teachers' seminary in 1935 and worked in that profession in Inari and Outakoski until 1969. He also worked for many years as an editor for the Sápmelaš monthly magazine. In 1985, Guttorm was shortlisted for the Nordic Council Literature Prize for his book Golgadeamen; the prize ended up going to Antti Tuuri, however.

== Works ==
- Koccam spalli: tivtak ja maidnasak (1940)
- Golgadeamen (1982)
- Čierru jietna meahcis (1982)
- Radjajohtin (1984)
- Iešnjárgga šiljut (1986)
- Šuvvi jahki (1996) (toim. Inga Guttorm)
