= Erik Aslaksen =

Australian engineer and physicist (born 1938)

Erik Waldemar Aslaksen
- Born: 2 November 1938 (age 87)
- Education: Swiss Federal Institute of Technology; Lehigh University
- Occupations: Engineer and physicist

Erik Waldemar Aslaksen FRSN (born 2 November 1938 in Oslo, Norway) is a systems engineer and physicist. After serving in the Norwegian Airforce, he obtained an MSc in electrical engineering from the Swiss Federal Institute of Technology in 1962, a Graduate Study Certificate from Bell Telephone Laboratories in 1965 and a PhD in theoretical physics from Lehigh University in 1968.

He has worked in the US, Switzerland and Australia in roles ranging from basic research to corporate management, including twelve years as adjunct professor at the University of Technology, Sydney. He is the author of numerous books, book chapters, and journal articles. In recent years, he has investigated the foundations of systems engineering. and the evolution of social systems.

He is a Fellow of the International Council on Systems Engineering (INCOSE) and a Fellow of the Royal Society of New South Wales.
