= Abresan Metro Station (Tabriz) =

Metro station in Tabriz, Iran

Abresan Station ایستگاه آبرسان

General information
- Location: Imam Khomeini Street; Districts 1-2, Tabriz; Iran
- Coordinates: 38.0668316°N 46.3217202°E
- System: Tabriz Metro Station
- Operator: Tabriz Urban and Suburban Railways Organization
- Line: 1
- Connections: Tabriz City Buses: BRT1 Rahahan-Basij; 144/2 Azarbayjan; 166 Kuy-e Daneshgah

History
- Opened: 4 Mehr, 1395 H-Sh (25 September 2016)

Services
Preceding station	Tabriz Metro	Following station
Daneshgah towards El Goli		Shahid Beheshti towards Noor
Location

Abresan Metro Station is a station on Tabriz Metro Line 1. The station opened on 25 September 2016. It is located on Tabriz's main street at Abresan bridge.
