= 29 Bahman Metro Station (Tabriz) =

Metro station in Tabriz, Iran

29 Bahman Station ایستگاه ۲۹ بهمن
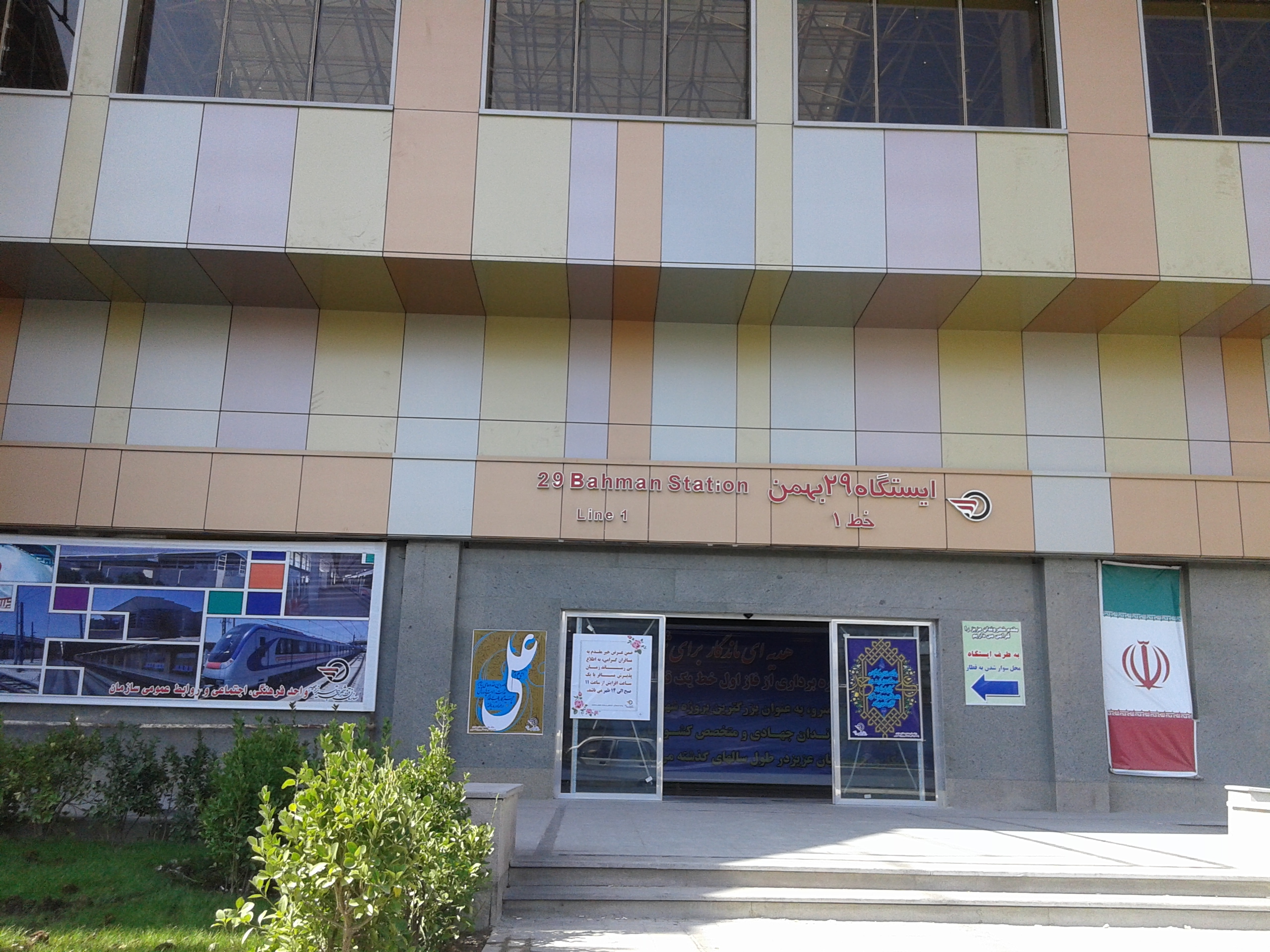

General information
- Location: 29 Bahman Boulevard, Tabriz Cable Bridge; Districts 1-2, Tabriz; Iran
- Coordinates: 38°3′15″N 46°20′50″E
- System: Tabriz Metro Station
- Operator: Tabriz Urban and Suburban Railways Organization
- Line: 1
- Connections: Tabriz City Buses: BRT1 Rahahan-Basij; 101 El Goli; 110/1 Valiasr; 110/2 Valiasr (Express); 127 Za'feranieh; 129/1 Mirdamad; 129/2 Mirdamad (Express); 139 Farhangshahr; 140 Shahrak-e Parvaz; 141 Basmenj; 142 Golshahr; 156 Baranj; 159 Negin Park; 161 Rajaeishahr; 176 Daneshgah-e Azad; 179 Shahrak-e Shahid Yaghchian

History
- Opened: 5 Shahrivar, 1394 H-Sh (27 August 2015)

Services
Preceding station	Tabriz Metro	Following station
Khayyam towards El Goli		Ostad Shahriar towards Noor
Location

29 Bahman Metro Station is a station on Tabriz Metro Line 1. The station opened on 27 August 2015. It is located on 29 Bahman Boulevard at Tabriz Cable Bridge. It is between Khayyam Metro Station and Ostad Shahriar Metro Station.
