= Emam Reza Metro Station (Tabriz) =

Metro station in Tabriz, Iran

Emam Reza Station ایستگاه امام رضا
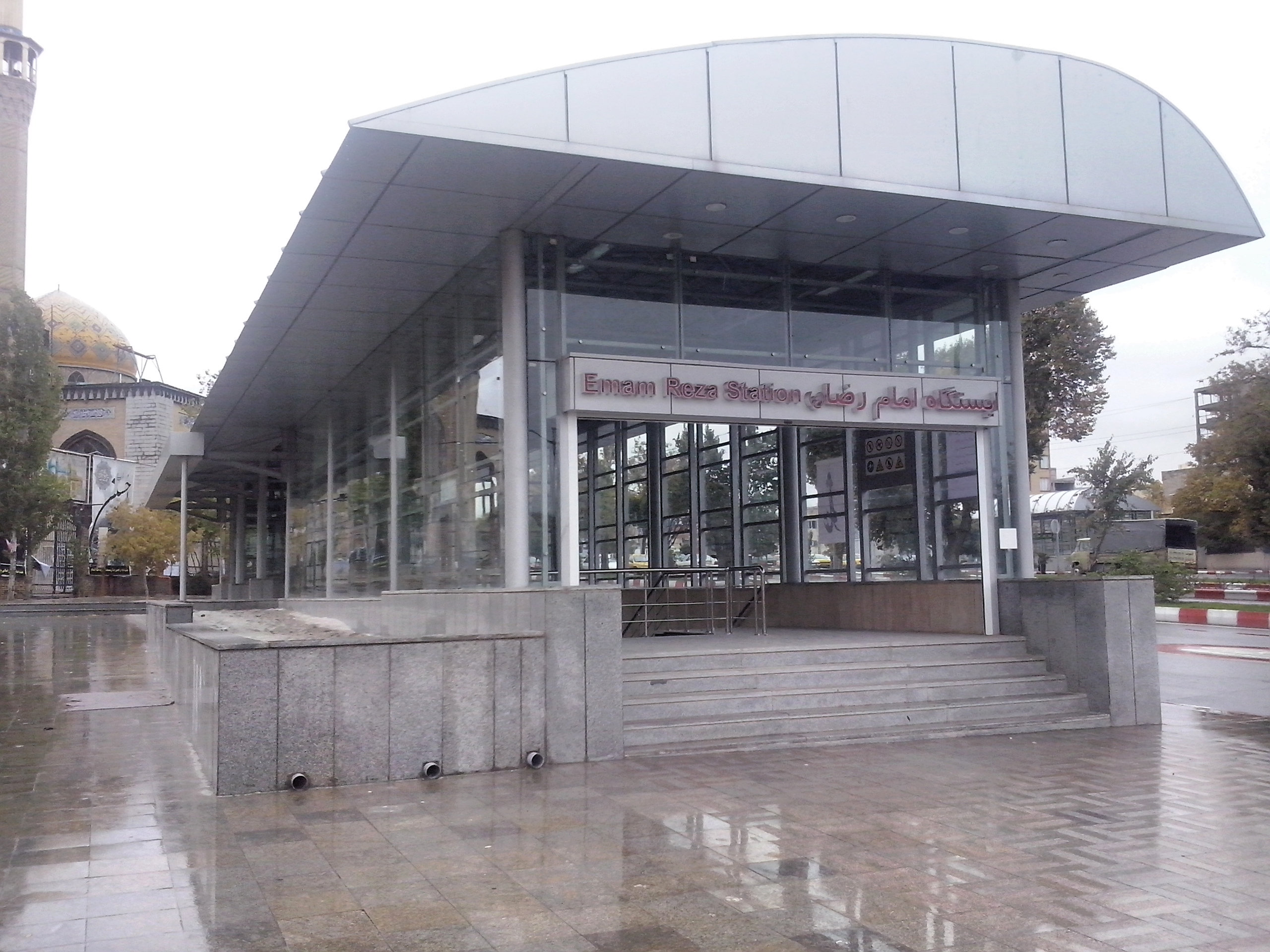

General information
- Location: Bakeri Boulevard, Golshahr; District 2, Tabriz; Iran
- Coordinates: 38°2′16″N 46°21′57″E
- System: Tabriz Metro Station
- Operator: Tabriz Urban and Suburban Railways Organization
- Line: 1
- Connections: Tabriz City Buses: 101 El Goli; 142 Golshahr

History
- Opened: 5 Shahrivar, 1394 H-Sh (27 August 2015)

Services
Preceding station	Tabriz Metro	Following station
Sahand towards El Goli		Khayyam towards Noor
Location

Emam Reza Metro Station is a station on Tabriz Metro Line 1. The station opened on 27 August 2015. It is located next on Bakeri Boulevard at Golshahr neighbourhood. It is between Sahand Metro Station and Khayyam Metro Station.
