= Shahid Beheshti Metro Station (Tabriz) =

Metro station in Tabriz, Iran

Shahid Beheshti Station ایستگاه شهید بهشتی

General information
- Location: Beheshti Square; Districts 3-8, Tabriz; Iran
- Coordinates: 38.0718446°N 46.3053426°E
- System: Tabriz Metro Station
- Operator: Tabriz Urban and Suburban Railways Organization
- Line: 1
- Connections: Tabriz City Buses: BRT1 Rahahan-Basij; 102 Shahid Montazeri; 103 Hafez

History
- Opened: 4 Mehr, 1395 H-Sh (25 September 2016)

Services
Preceding station	Tabriz Metro	Following station
Abresan towards El Goli		Meydan-e Sa'at towards Noor
Location

Shahid Beheshti Metro Station is a station on Tabriz Metro Line 1. The station opened on 25 September 2016. It is located in central area of Tabriz, on Beheshti Square.
