= Daneshgah Metro Station (Tabriz) =

Metro station in Tabriz, Iran

Daneshgah Station ایستگاه دانشگاه

General information
- Location: 29 Bahman Street; Districts District 1, Tabriz; Iran
- Coordinates: 38.0648318°N 46.3297722°E
- System: Tabriz Metro Station
- Operator: Tabriz Urban and Suburban Railways Organization
- Line: 1
- Connections: Tabriz City Buses: BRT1 Rahahan-Basij; 166 Kuy-e Daneshgah

History
- Opened: 22 Shahrivar 1396 H-Sh (13 September 2017)

Services
Preceding station	Tabriz Metro	Following station
Ostad Shahriar towards El Goli		Abresan towards Noor
Location

Daneshgah Metro Station is a station on Tabriz Metro Line 1. The station opened on 13 September 2017. It is located across from University of Tabriz, and is named after the university (Daneshgah being Persian for University).
