= Meydan-e Sa'at Metro Station (Tabriz) =

Metro station in Tabriz, Iran

Meydan-e Sa'at Station ایستگاه میدان ساعت

General information
- Location: Sa'at Square; District 8, Tabriz; Iran
- Coordinates: 38.0743615°N 46.2967596°E
- System: Tabriz Metro Station
- Operator: Tabriz Urban and Suburban Railways Organization
- Line: 1
- Connections: Tabriz City Buses: BRT1 Rahahan-Basij; 102 Shahid Montazeri; 103 Hafez; 104 Mashruteh-Terminal; 120 Shahid Beheshti

History
- Opened: 4 Mehr, 1395 H-Sh (25 September 2016)

Services
Preceding station	Tabriz Metro	Following station
Shahid Beheshti towards El Goli		Meydan-e Kohan towards Noor
Location

Meydan-e Sa'at Metro Station is a station on Tabriz Metro Line 1. The station opened on 25 September 2016. It is located in central area of Tabriz, on Sa'at Square, in Iran. The site in near several landmarks, mainly its namesake Saat Tower.
