= Khayyam Metro Station (Tabriz) =

Metro station in Tabriz, Iran

Khayyam Station ایستگاه خیام
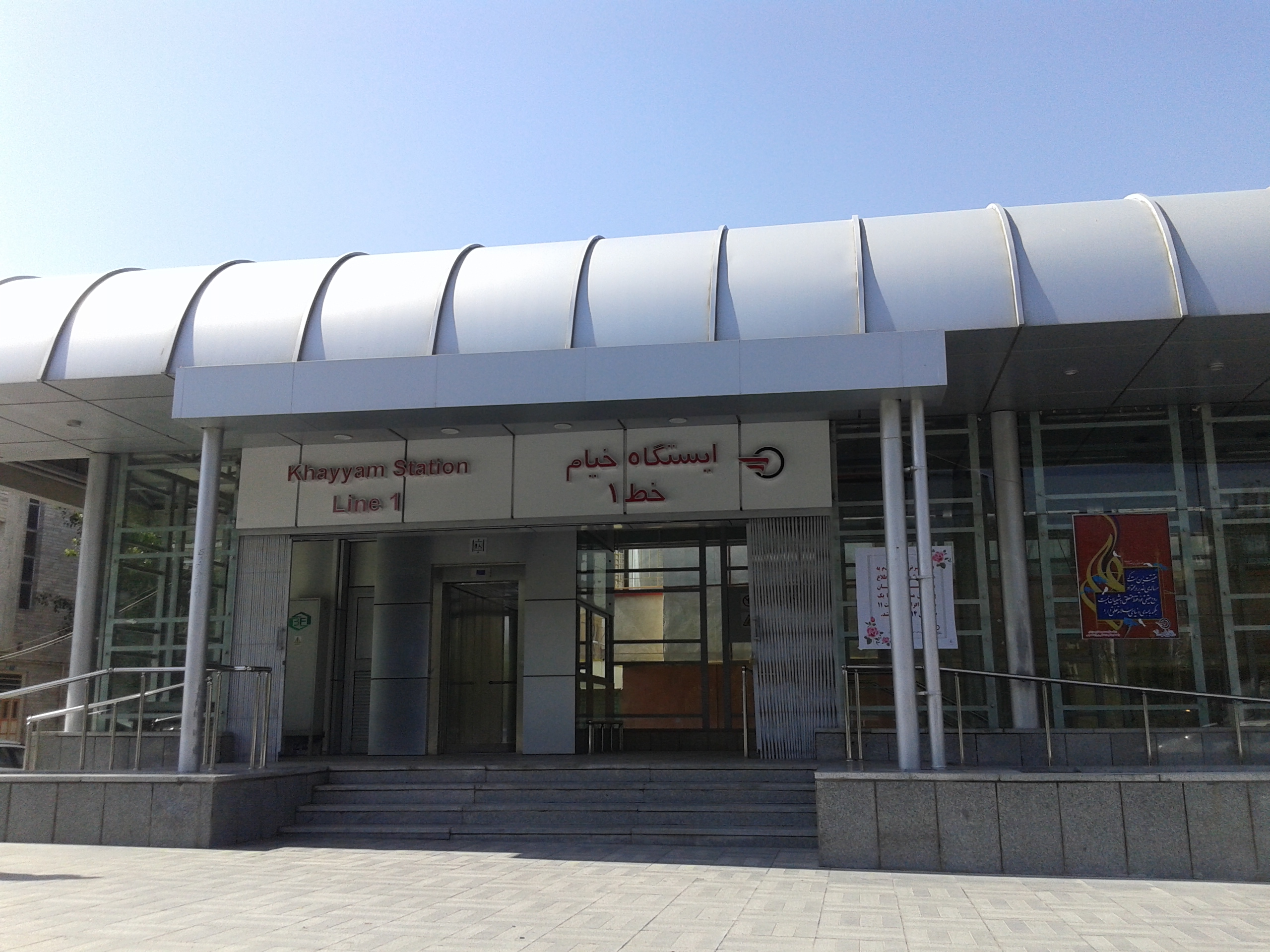

General information
- Location: Bakeri Boulevard; Khayyam Square, Rajaeishahr; District 2, Tabriz; Iran
- Coordinates: 38°2′49″N 46°21′12″E
- System: Tabriz Metro Station
- Operator: Tabriz Urban and Suburban Railways Organization
- Line: 1
- Connections: Tabriz City Buses: 101 El Goli; 142 Golshahr; 161 Rajaeishahr

History
- Opened: 5 Shahrivar, 1394 H-Sh (27 August 2015)

Services
Preceding station	Tabriz Metro	Following station
Emam Reza towards El Goli		29 Bahman towards Noor
Location

Khayyam Metro Station is a station on Tabriz Metro Line 1. The station opened on 27 August 2015. It is located next on Bakeri Boulevard at Khayyam Square near Rajaeishahr neighbourhood. It is between Emam Reza Metro Station and 29 Bahman Metro Station.
