= Ostad Shahriar Metro Station (Tabriz) =

Metro station in Tabriz, Iran

Ostad Shahriar Station ایستگاه استاد شهریار
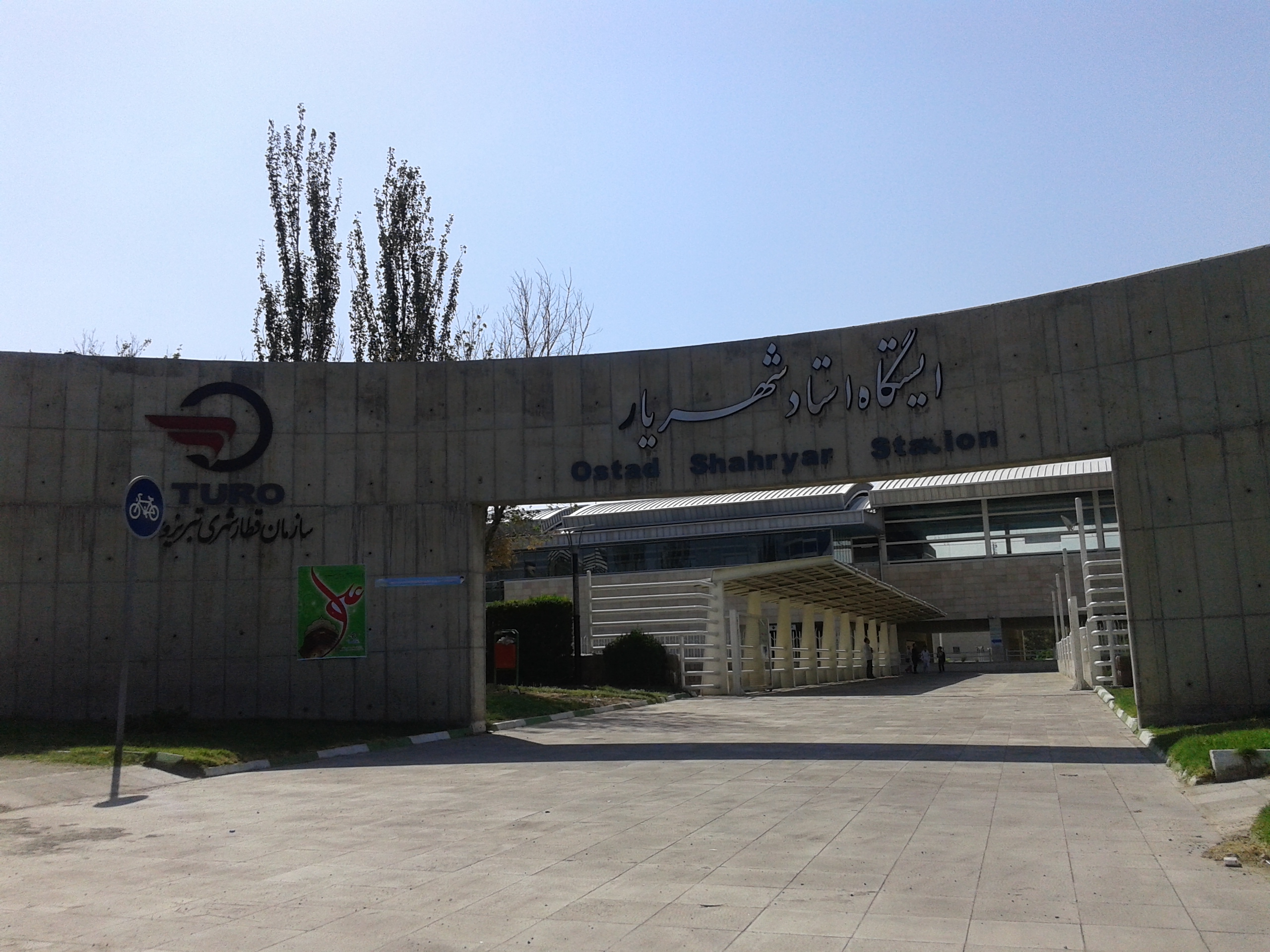

General information
- Location: Shahriar Expressway, Baghlar Baghi; District 1, Tabriz; Iran
- Coordinates: 38°3′38″N 46°20′36″E
- System: Tabriz Metro Station
- Operator: Tabriz Urban and Suburban Railways Organization
- Line: 1
- Connections: Tabriz City Buses: 101 El Goli; 110/1 Valiasr; 110/2 Valiasr (Express); 127 Za'feranieh; 129/1 Mirdamad; 129/2 Mirdamad (Express); 139 Farhangshahr; 140 Shahrak-e Parvaz; 142 Golshahr; 156 Baranj; 159 Negin Park; 161 Rajaeishahr; 179 Shahrak-e Shahid Yaghchian

History
- Opened: 5 Shahrivar, 1394 H-Sh (27 August 2015)

Services
Preceding station	Tabriz Metro	Following station
29 Bahman towards El Goli		Daneshgah towards Noor
Location

Ostad Shariar Metro Station is a station on Tabriz Metro Line 1. The station opened on 27 August 2015. It is located on Shahriar Expressway at Mehranrud River shore next to Baghlar Baghi Garden. The next eastern station is 29 Bahman Metro Station and the next western station is Daneshgah Metro station.
