= Sahand Metro Station (Tabriz) =

Metro station in Tabriz, Iran

Sahand Station ایستگاه سهند
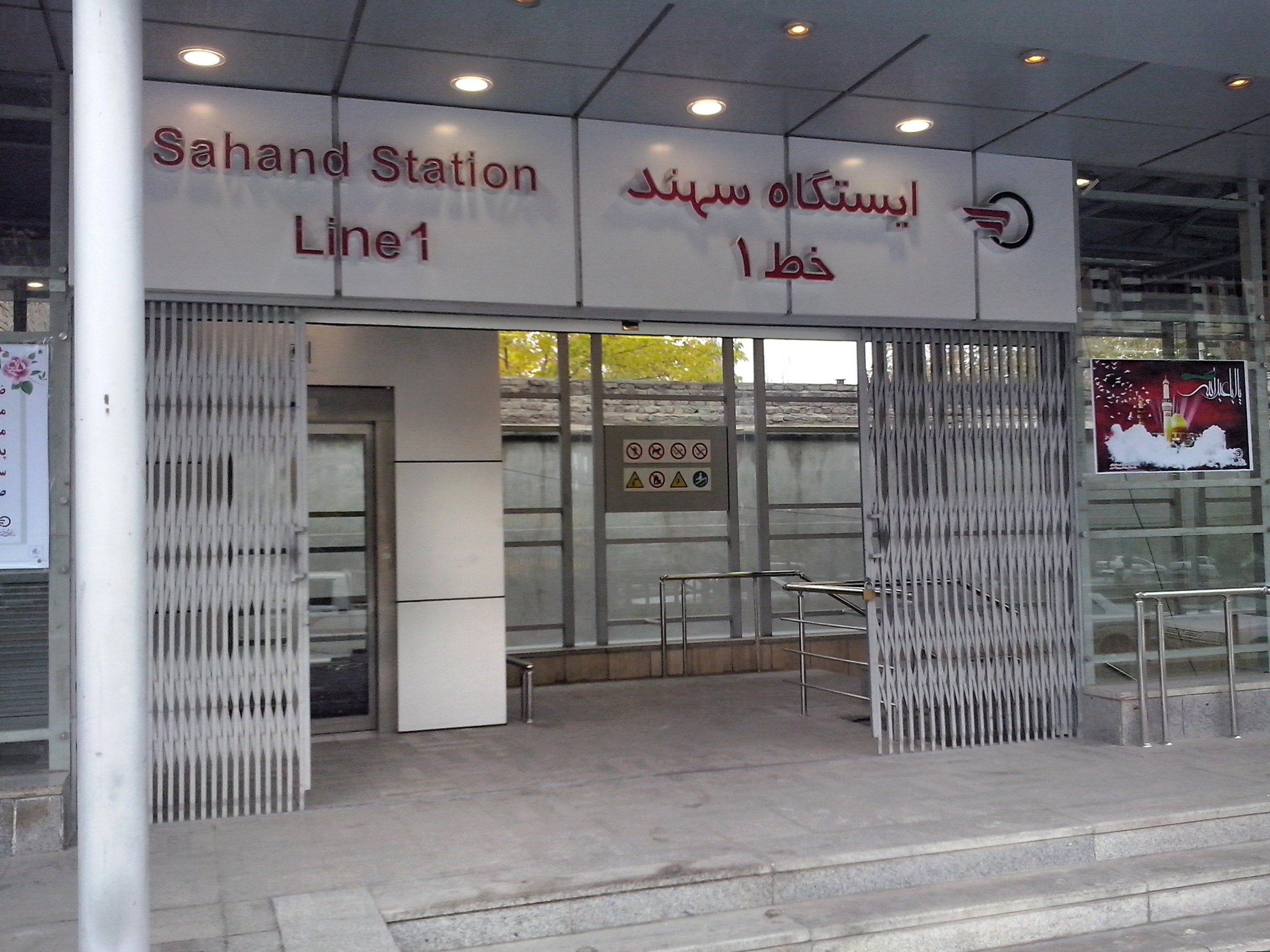

General information
- Location: Bakeri Boulevard, Kuy-e Sahand; District 2, Tabriz; Iran
- Coordinates: 38°1′47″N 46°21′46″E
- System: Tabriz Metro Station
- Operator: Tabriz Urban and Suburban Railways Organization
- Line: 1
- Connections: Tabriz City Buses: 101 El Goli

History
- Opened: 5 Shahrivar, 1394 H-Sh (27 August 2015)

Services
| Preceding station | Tabriz Metro | Following station |
|---|---|---|
| El Goli Terminus | | Emam Reza towards Noor |
Location

Sahand Metro Station is a station on Tabriz Metro Line 1. The station opened on 27 August 2015. It is located next on Bakeri Boulevard at Kuy-e Sahand neighbourhood. It is between El Goli Metro Station and Emam Reza Metro Station.
