= Tabriz Cable Bridge =

Tabriz Cable Bridge پل کابلی تبریز
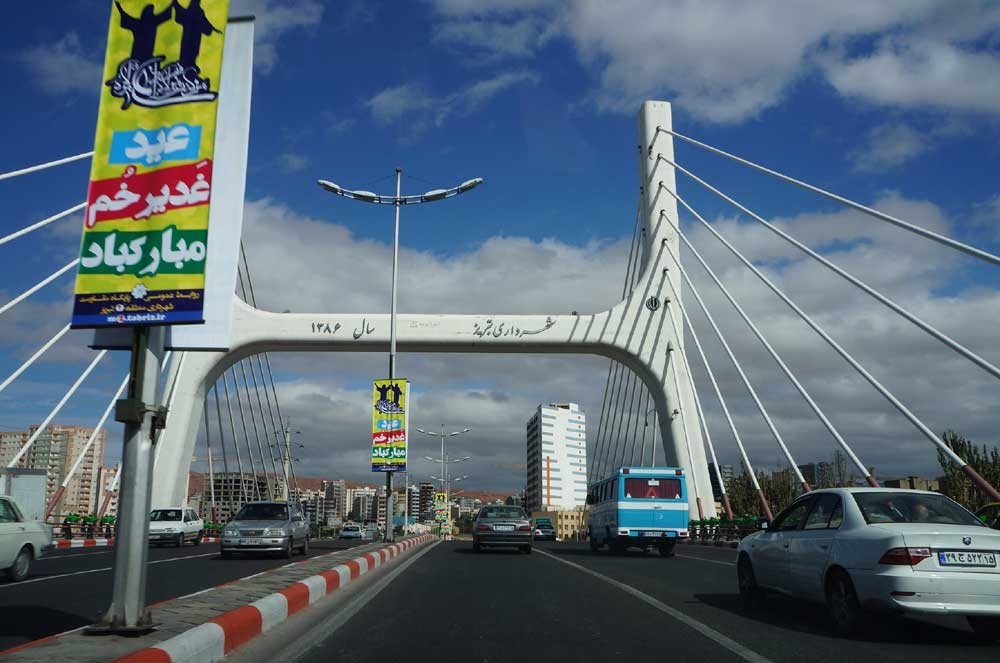
- Coordinates: 38.0309°N 46.2103°E
- Locale: Tabriz, Iran
- Other name(s): Ettehad-e Melli
- Owner: Municipality of Tabriz
- Maintained by: Municipality of Tabriz

Characteristics
- Design: Cable-stayed bridges
- Material: Concrete
- Total length: 113 m (371 ft)
- Width: 32 m (105 ft)

History
- Engineering design by: Iranian and French firms
- Constructed by: Iran and France
- Construction start: 2003
- Construction end: 2007
- Construction cost: 75 million dollars
- Opened: 2007
- Inaugurated: 2007

Tabriz Cable Bridge (Persian: پل کابلی تبریز), officially calls Ettehad-e-Melli (National Unity), is a cable-stayed bridge flanked by 29 Bahman Metro Station at the eastern entrance of Tabriz, capital of East Azerbaijan province, Iran. It is the biggest cable-stayed bridge in Iran with a total length of 113 meters and width of 32 meters.

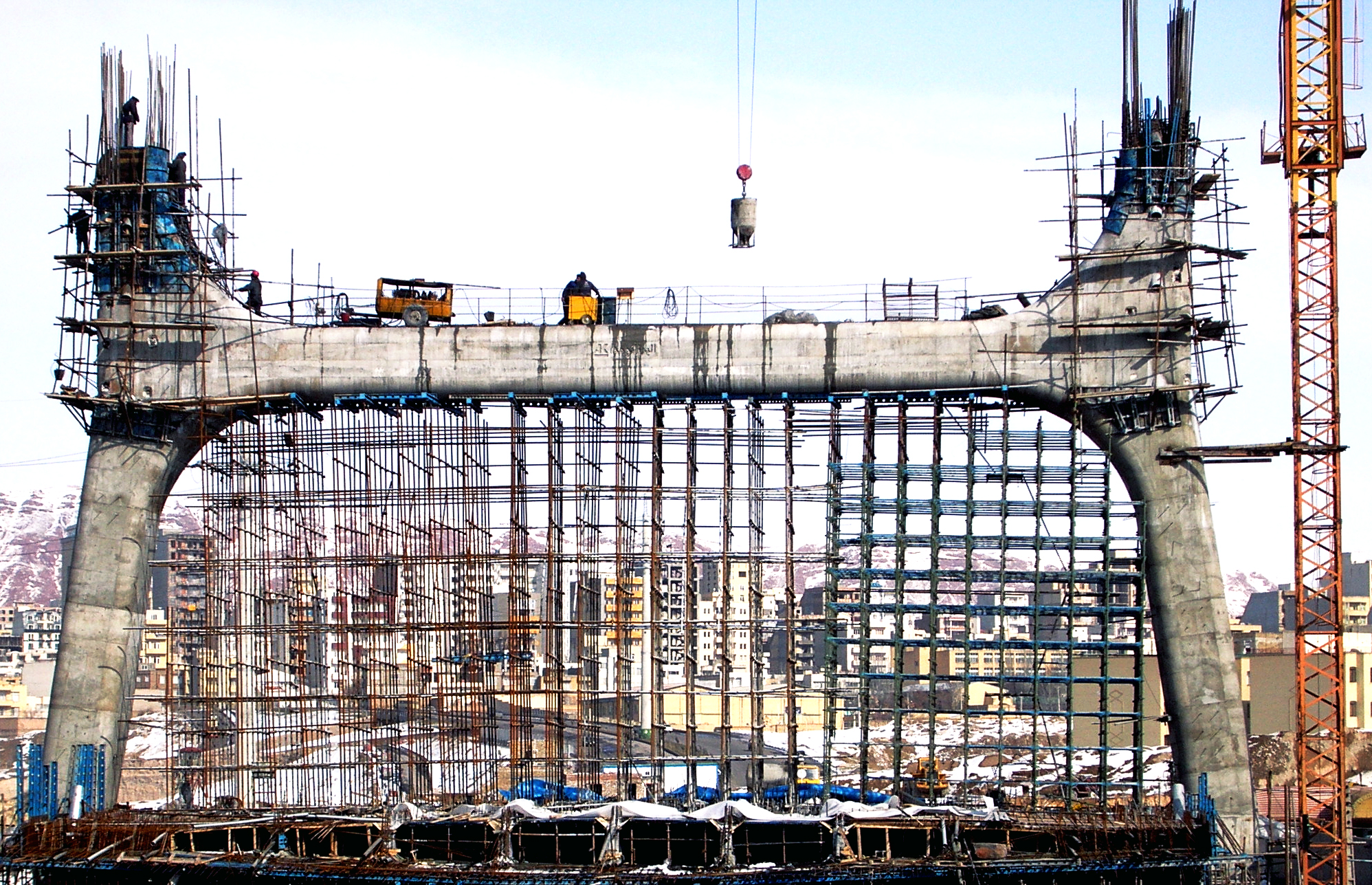
Workers on the middle pier of an inchoate hanging cable bridge in Tabriz, Iran
