= Tabriz Metro =

Rapid transit system in Tabriz, Iran

Tabriz Metro متروی تبریز / Metro-ye Tabrīz
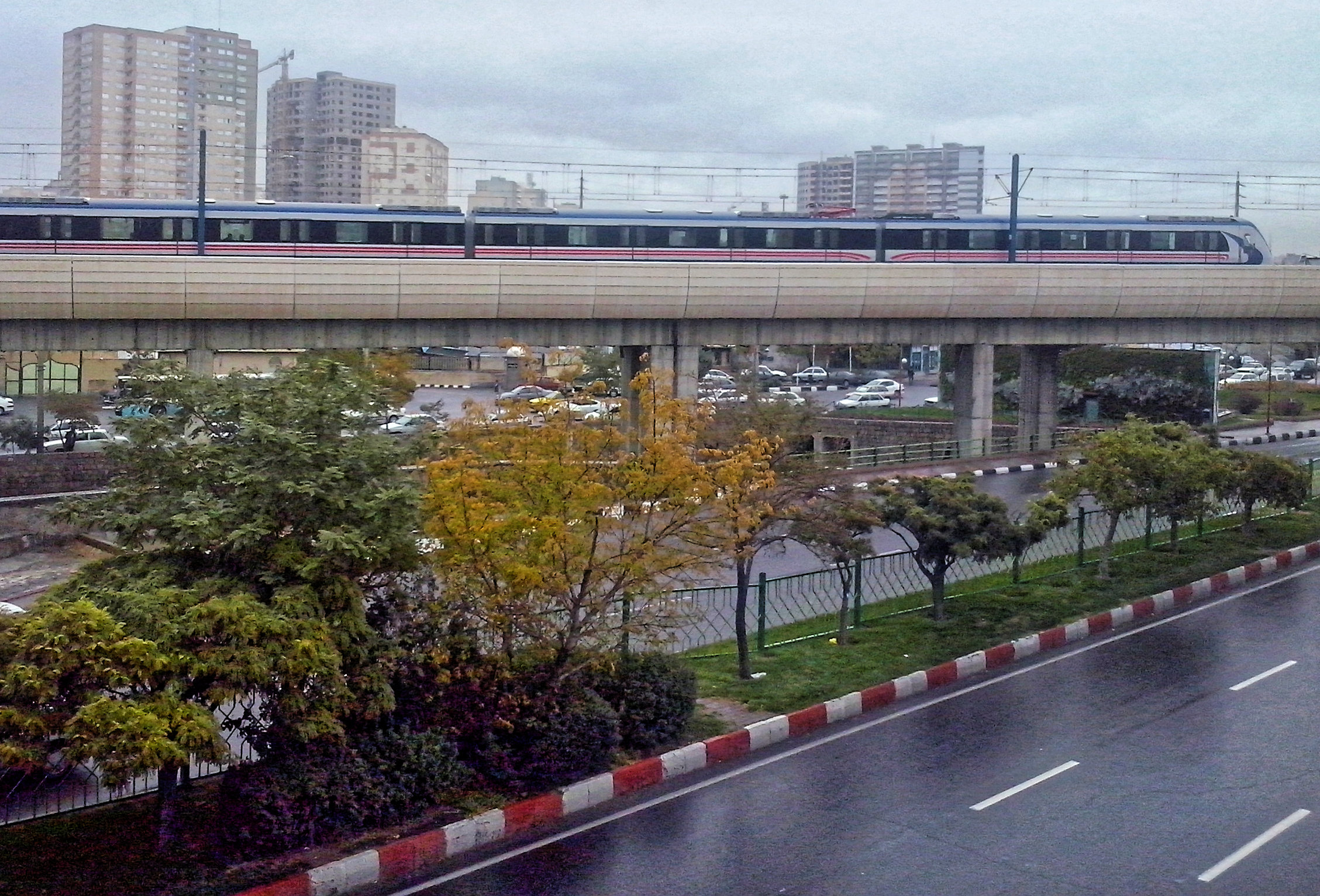

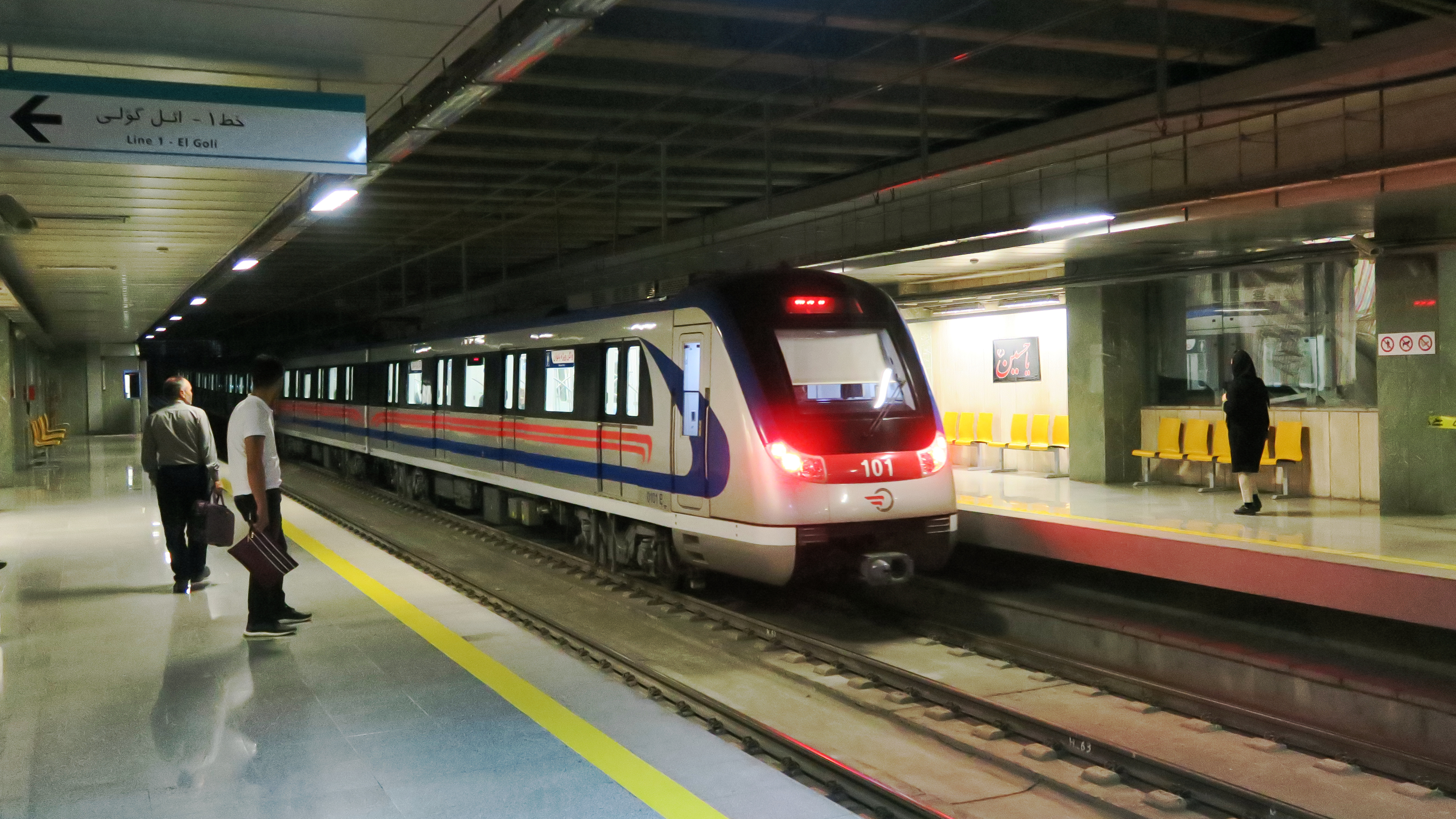

Overview
- Native name: Tabriz Urban and Suburban Railway قطار شهری تبریز و حومه / Ghatār šahr-ye Tabrīz va ḥūmeh
- Owner: Tabriz Municipality
- Locale: Tabriz
- Transit type: Rapid transit
- Number of lines: 5 (Active 1)
- Number of stations: 70 (Active 18)
- Website: Urban Railway Organization

Operation
- Began operation: August 27, 2015; 11 years ago
- Operators: Tabriz Urban and Suburban Railway Organization

Technical
- System length: Total: 100 km (inc. 50 km Tramway); Active Line 1: 17.2 km
- Track gauge: 1,435 mm (4 ft 8 1/2 in) (standard gauge)
System Map
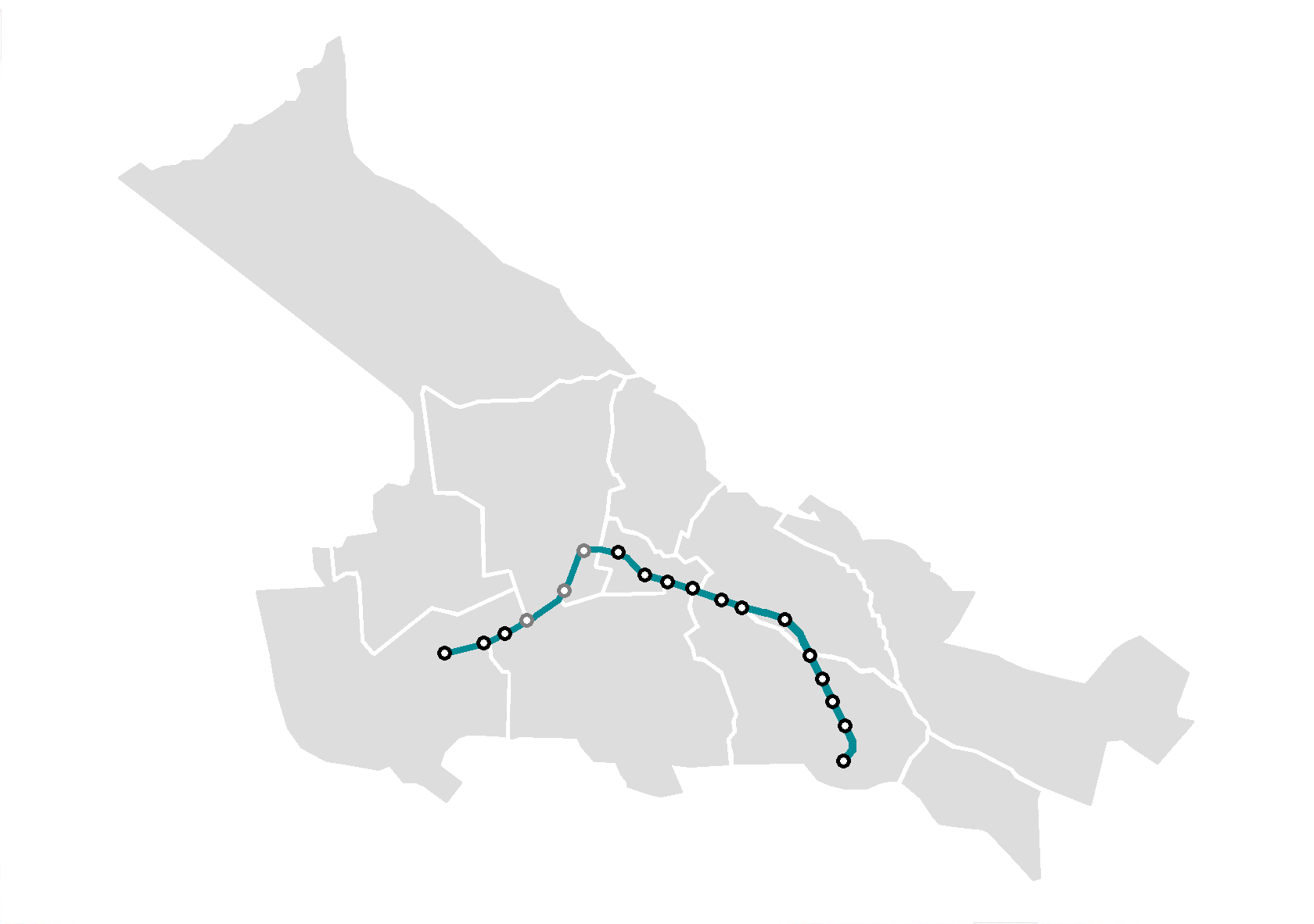

The Tabriz Metro is a rapid transit system serving the city of Tabriz, in northwestern Iran. The first phase opened on 28 August 2015 with a 7 km length and 6 stations. There is also one regional commuter line planned to Sahand.

== Lines ==
=== Line 1 ===
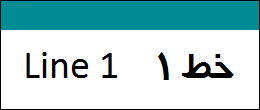

Its first phase opened on 27 August 2015. The 7 km route runs northwest from El Goli to Ostad Shahryar with four intermediate stations, including three in a tunnel excavated using TBMs. Services are operated with coupled pairs of five-car trainsets. There was free-of-charge services from 11:00 to 13:00 for 3 months starting from Saturday 29 August 2015. The first phase was 7 km long and had 6 stations from El Goli Station to Ostad Shahriar Station. The frequency of the services was every 20 min. The second phase opened in summer 2016 and extended to the west from Ostad Shahriar Station to Meydan-e Sa'at Station. The line finally completed in February 2020 with another western extension and now runs for 17.2 km from El Goli to Nur with 12 stations; 6 intermediate stations are to open yet.

=== Line 2 ===
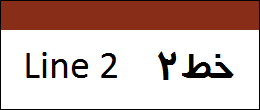

Line 2 which is currently under construction is approximately 22.4 km long, consisting of 20 stations starting from the quay lands (organic fertilizer plant), through Wahdat and Jaramalek Square (the first station) and passing under Akhouni Street, Qods Street, Amin Road, Maidan. Daneshwara goes into Abbasi Street and extends to Shahid Fahmideh Square.

=== Line 3 ===
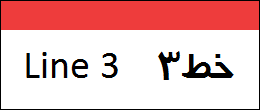

Line 3 is currently in the planning stage. It will have a mostly north–south route, running from Tabriz International Airport to South Terminal (next to Kasaei highway). Along the way it will connect major passenger nodes such as North Terminal, central park, Bazaar District, Stadium military medical, Academia centers, and Yadgar-e-Emam Stadium. It will cross crowded slum districts, likely attracting more riders than the other lines. It will be 14.7 km long and have 14 stops, including 4 transfers to other lines.

=== Line 4 ===
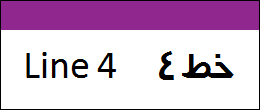

Line 4 of Tabriz metro will encircle the old city centre and intersect with all the other 3 lines. Tramway, with a length of 15.4 km, including 18 stations, starts circularly from the Azarbaijan field and crosses the Tabriz Highway to the Pasdaran Highway after crossing the Jihad and Abrasan Square. This line connects the other three lines.

=== Tabriz-Sahand Commuter Line (Line 5) ===
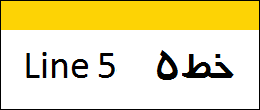

Line 5 of Tabriz metro is planned as a light rail train that connects Tabriz to its satellite city, Sahand. Tabriz-Sahand: At station 1, line 1 will have a common station and continue across the tractor to Sahand.

Of all these routes, only a portion of Line 1 is currently operating between El Goli Station and Nur Station.

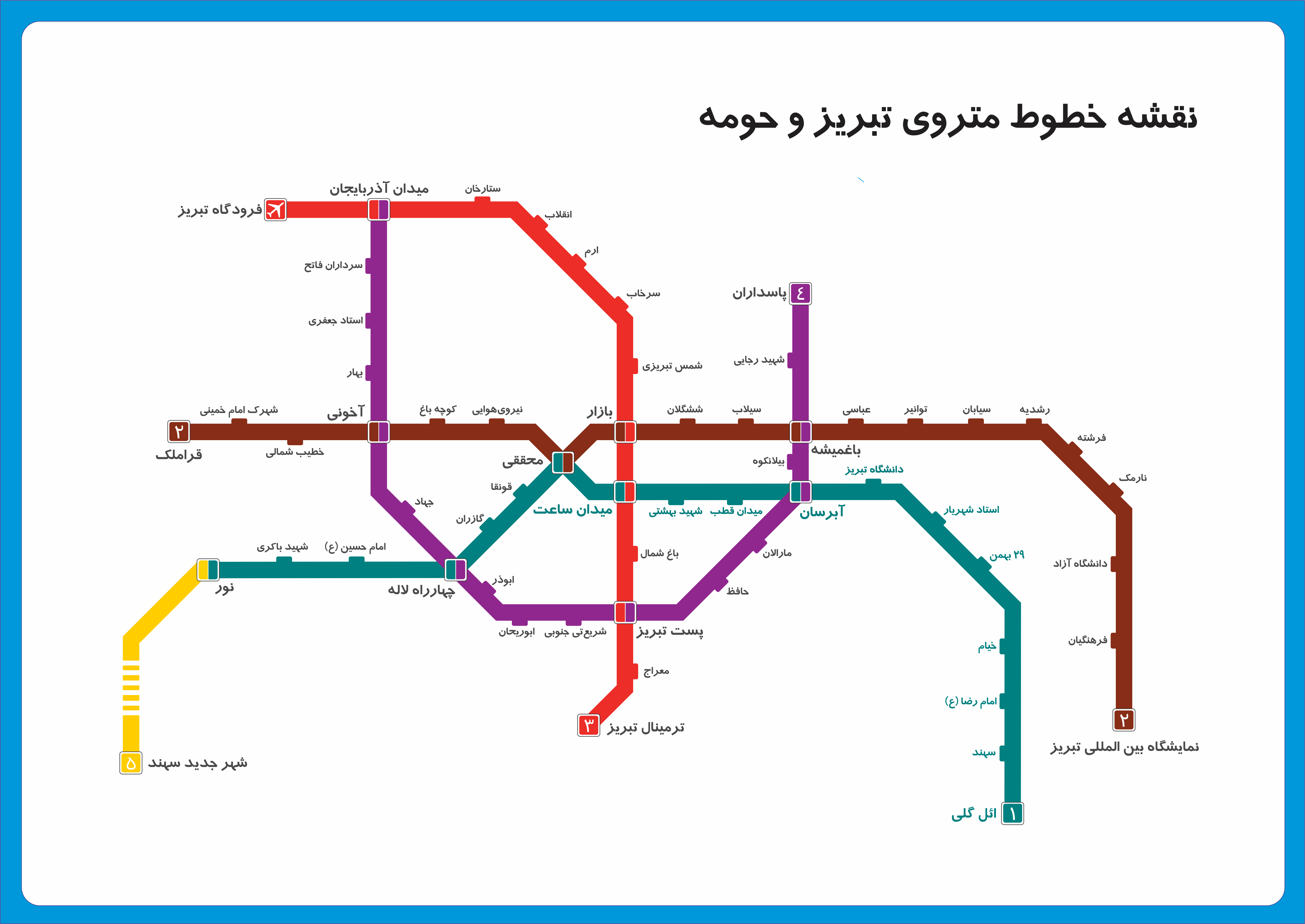
Tabriz metro map

Also a tram line has been proposed to feed the metro.

== Gallery ==
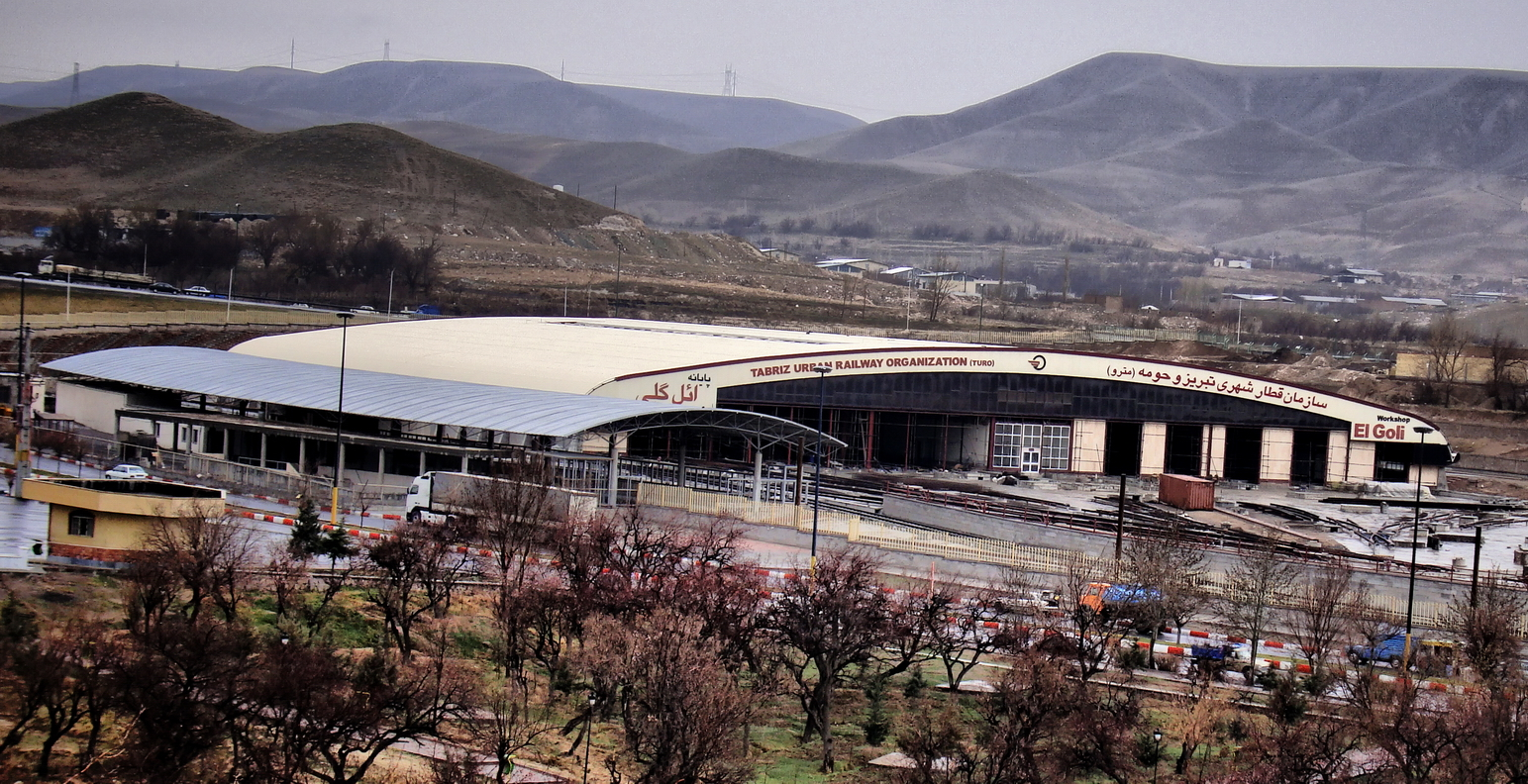
El Goli station

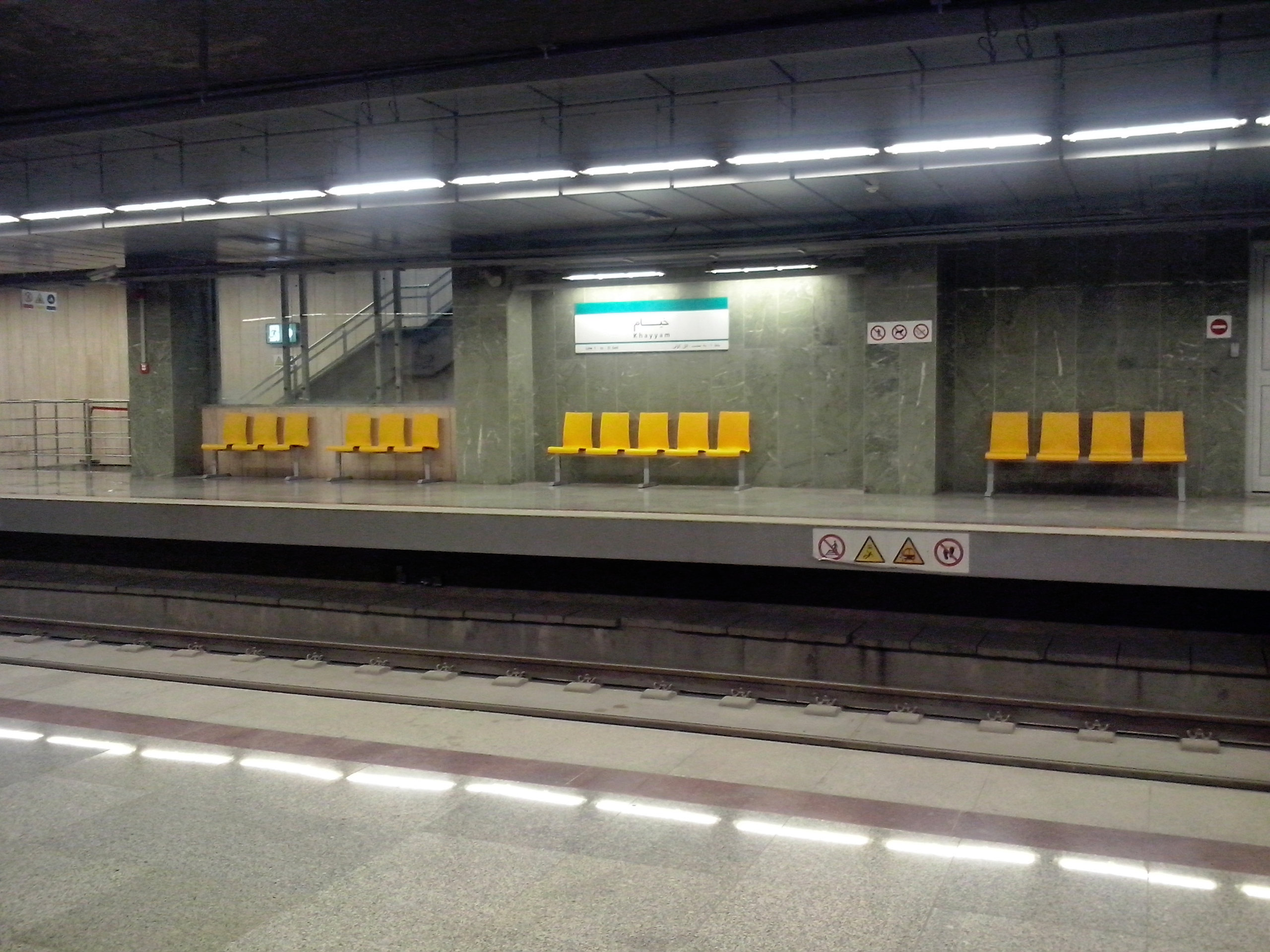
Khayyam station

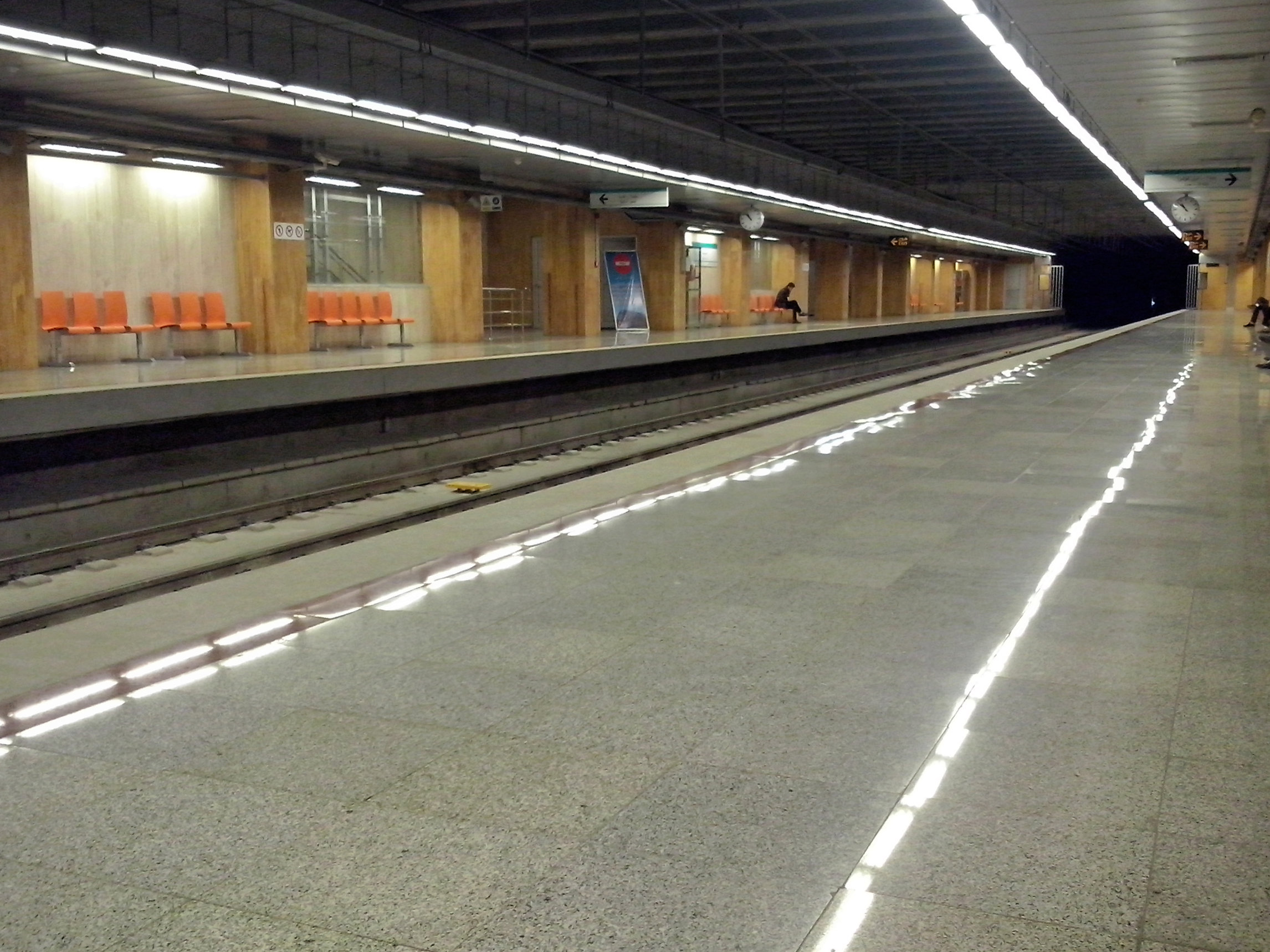
Sahand station

== See also ==
- Rapid transit in Iran
