= Tabriz and Suburbs Bus Company =

Iranian bus operator

Tabriz and Suburbs Bus Company شرکت اتوبوسراني تبریز و حومه
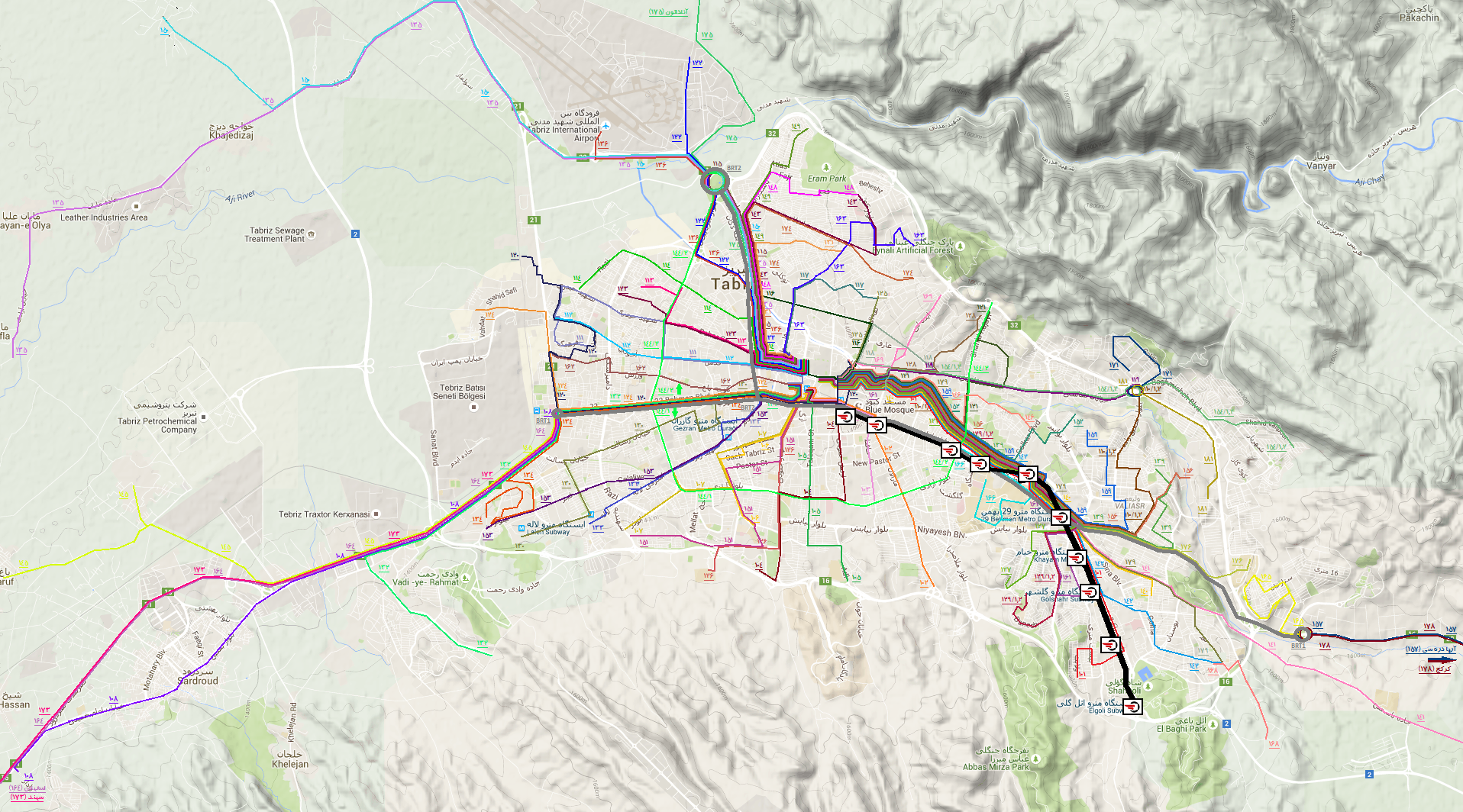
- Founded: April 22, 1966
- Headquarters: 5 Mordad Square, Tabriz
- Service area: Tabriz, Basmenj, Sahand, Sardrud; East Azerbaijan Province
- Service type: Bus service
- Routes: 2 BRT Route
- Operator: Tabriz Municipality
- Chief executive: Ya'qub Vahidkia
- Website: شرکت اتوبوسرانی تبریز و حومه

Tabriz and Suburbs Bus Company (Persian: شرکت اتوبوسراني تبریز و حومه) is a public transport agency that operates transit buses in Tabriz city and surrounding satellite cities and settlements in central East Azerbaijan Province, one of the provinces of Iran. The system, alongside Tabriz Metro is responsible for urban transportation of Tabriz.
