= El Goli Metro Station (Tabriz) =

Metro station in Tabriz, Iran

El Goli Station ایستگاه ائل گؤلی
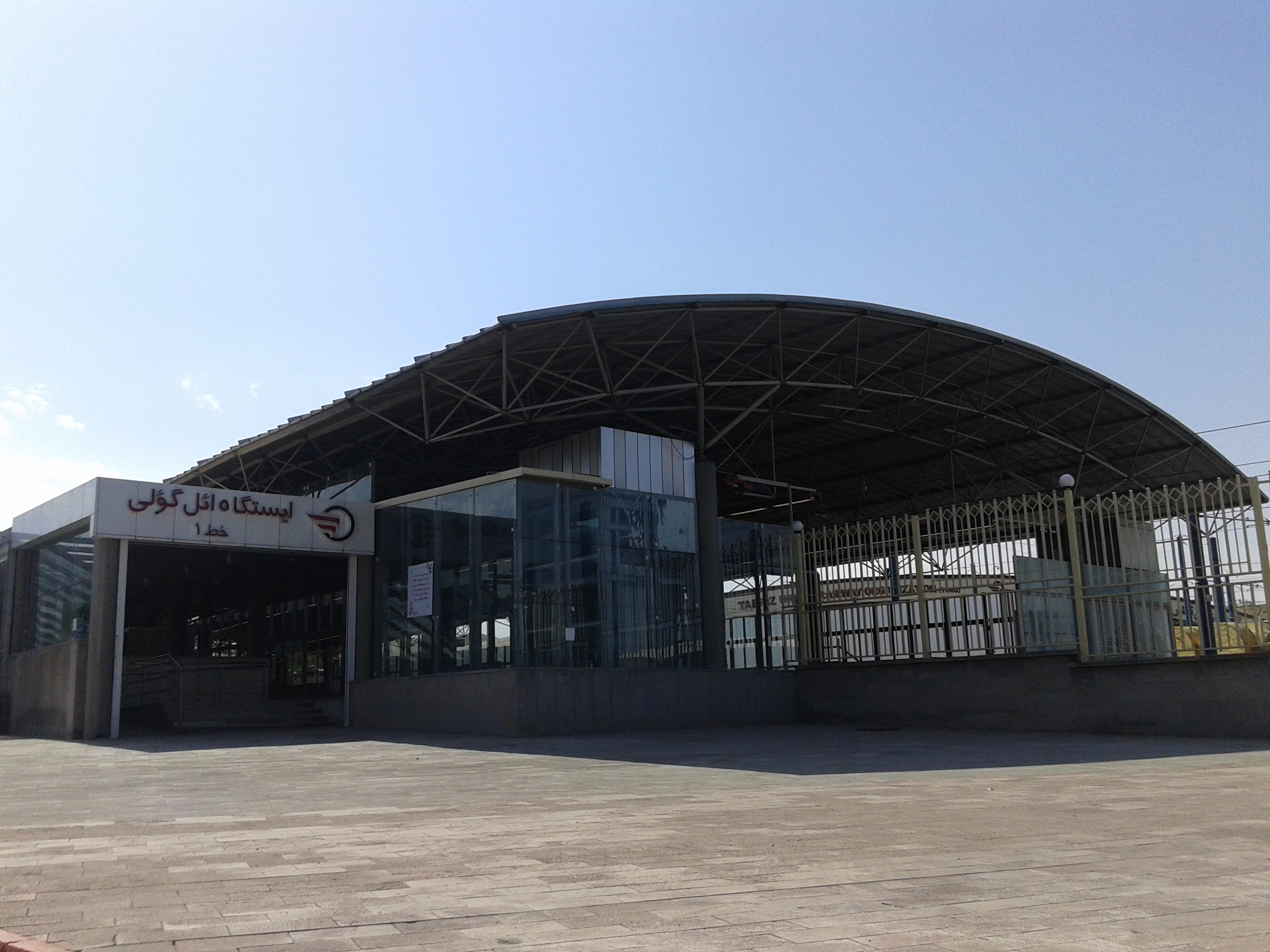

General information
- Location: Tabriz Southern Freeway, El-Gölü; District 2, Tabriz; Iran
- Coordinates: 38°1′17″N 46°21′58″E
- System: Tabriz Metro Station
- Operator: Tabriz Urban and Suburban Railways Organization
- Line: 1

History
- Opened: 5 Shahrivar, 1394 H-Sh (27 August 2015)

Services
Preceding station	Tabriz Metro	Following station
Terminus		Sahand towards Noor
Location

El Goli Metro Station is a station on Tabriz Metro Line 1 next to Tabriz Southern Freeway and opened on 27 August 2015. It is the southeastern terminus of line 1 with a depot located next to the station. The next station to the North is Sahand Metro Station.
