= Ganna (seeress) =

Germanic prophet

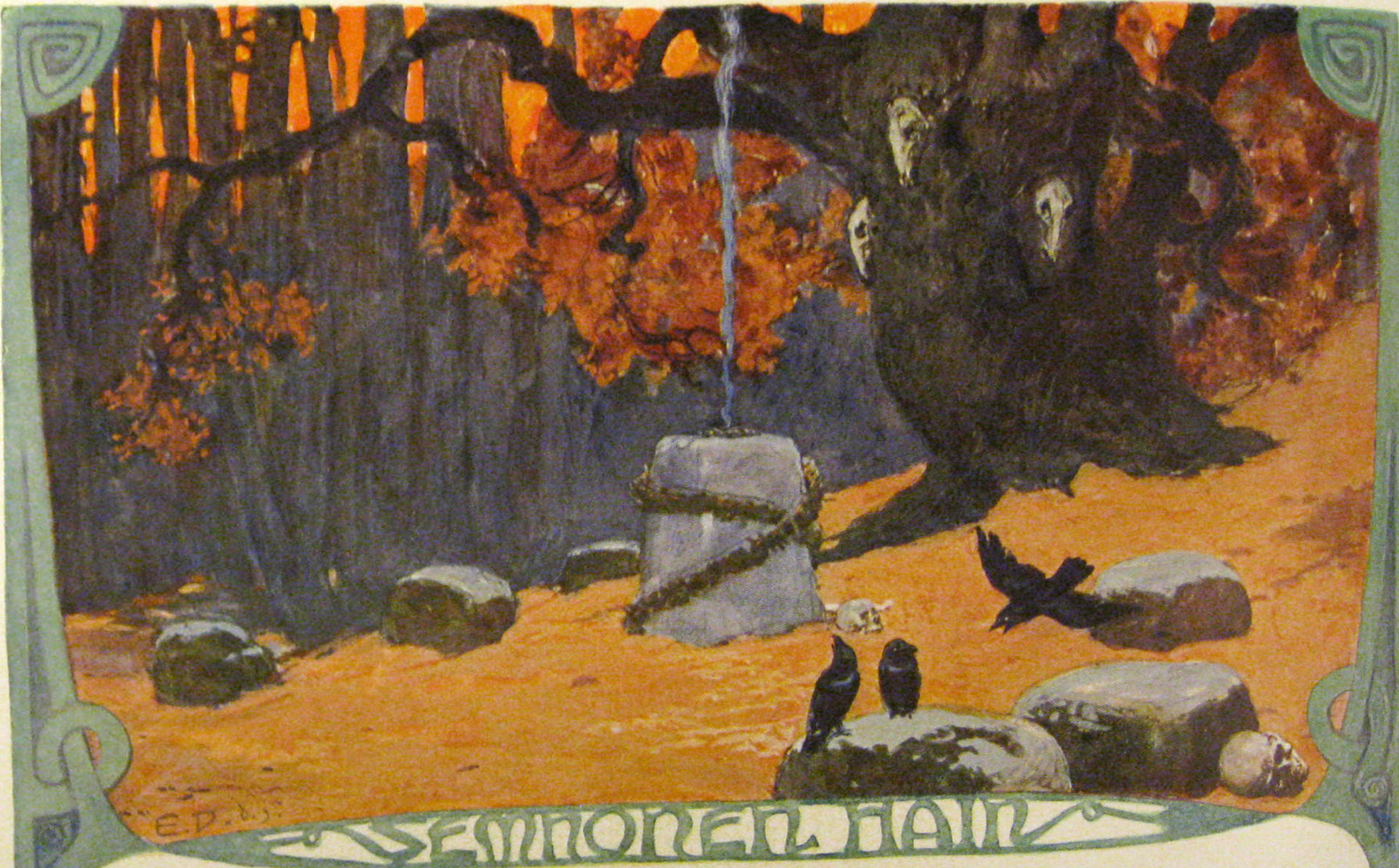
It appears to have been Ganna herself, and her king Masyus, who informed Tacitus of the Semnoni religious practices. An illustration of the Semnoni sacred grove, which is identified with the Grove of Fetters in Scandinavian heroic legend.

Ganna (Greek: Γάννα) was a Germanic seeress (also called priestess), of the Semnoni tribe, who succeeded the seeress Veleda as the leader of a Germanic alliance in rebellion against the Roman Empire. She went together with her king Masyus as envoys to Rome to discuss with Roman emperor Domitian himself, and was received with honours, after which she returned home. She is only mentioned by name in the works of Cassius Dio, but she also appears to have provided posterity with select information about the religious practices and the mythology of the early Germanic tribes, through the contemporary Roman historian Tacitus who wrote them down in Germania. Her name may be a reference to her priestly insignia, the wand, or to her spiritual abilities, and she probably taught her craft to Waluburg who would serve as a seeress in Roman Egypt at the First Cataract of the Nile.

Ganna and the other Germanic seeresses served an important political role in Germanic society, and the Romans always had to take their opinions into account when interacting with the Germanic peoples east of the Rhine.

== Historical account ==
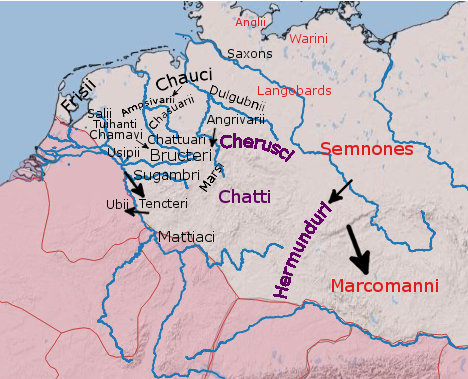
The approximate positions of some Germanic peoples reported by Graeco-Roman authors in the 1st century. Suevian peoples in red, and other Irminones in purple.

The only mention of her name appears in a line in the works of the Roman historiographer Cassius Dio in the early 3rd c.:

ὅτι Μάσυος 1 ὁ Σεμνόνων βασιλεὺς καὶ Γάννα παρθένος ἣν μετὰ τὴν Οὐελήδαν 2 ἐν τῇ Κελτικῇ θειάζουσα ἦλθον πρὸς τὸν Δομιτιανόν, καὶ τιμῆς παρ᾽ αὐτοῦ τυχόντες ἀνεκομίσθησαν

Masyos, king of the Semnones, and the virgin Ganna, who had appeared as a seeress in Celtica after Veleda, came to Domitian, were treated honourably and were returned. (Simek's translation).

Masyus, king of the Semnones, and Ganna, a virgin who was priestess in Germany, having succeeded Veleda, came to Domitian and after being honoured by him returned home. (Gary's translation).

The manuscripts usually give the location where she lived as Celtica, but the context is the campaign in Germania, east of the Rhine by Emperor Domitian in the 80s of the 1st c. AD.

Ganna belonged to a tribe called the Semnones who were settled east of the river Elbe, and she appears to have been active in the second half of the 1st c., after Veleda's time. Tacitus relates that the Germanic tribes ascribed prophetic powers to women, but the seeresses do not appear to have been just any women, but existing as an office, where Veleda was succeeded by Ganna. The political role that the seeresses played was always present when the Romans were dealing with the Germanic tribes, and Ganna's political influence so considerable that she was taken to Rome together with Masyos, the king of her tribe, where they had an audience with the Roman emperor Domitian and were treated with honours, after which they returned home. This probably happened in 86 AD, the year after his final war with the Chatti, when he made a treaty with the Cherusci, who were settled between the rivers Weser and the Elbe.

She probably taught the craft of prophesying to a young fellow tribeswoman named Waluburg who would serve as a seeress at the First Cataract of the Nile in Egypt.

== Etymology ==
It is notable that Ganna is not referred to as a sibylla, but as theiázousa (θειάζουσἀ), which means 'someone making prophesies'. Her name Ganna is usually interpreted as Proto-Germanic *Gan-nō and compared with Old Norse gandr in the meaning 'magical staff', and Ganna would mean the 'one who carries the magical staff' or 'she who controls the magical staff or something similar'. Her name is thus grouped with other seeresses who have staff names, or names that can be interpreted as such, like Gambara ('wand-bearer') and Waluburg from walu-, 'staff' (ON vǫlr), and the same word is found in the name of North Germanic seeresses, the vǫlur, who always had staffs. Simek analyses gandr as a 'magic staff' and the 'insignia of her calling', but in a later work he adds that it meant 'magic object or being' and instead of referring to a wand as her tool or insignia, her name may instead have been a reference to her function among the Germanic tribes (like Veleda's name). Sundqvist suggests that the name may have referred instead to her abilities, like de Vries who connects her name directly to the ablaut grade ginn- ('magical ability').

Other interpretations of her name derive it from PGmc *gunþjō ('war'), or suggest that it may be related to the names Gannicus or Gannascus of possibly Celtic origin, and an attested Celtic Gana-.

== Possible meeting with Tacitus ==
During their stay in Rome, Ganna and Masyos appear also to have met with the Roman historian Tacitus who reports that he discussed the Semnoni religious practices with informants from that tribe, who considered themselves the noblest of the Suebi. Bruce Lincoln (1986) discusses Tacitus' likely meeting with Ganna and what the Roman historian learnt of the mythological traditions of the early Germanic tribes, and of the Semnoni's ancestral relationships with the other tribes from Ing (Yngvi), Ist and Irmin (Odin), the sons of Mannus, the son of Tuisto. The Semnoni enacted the "horrific origins" of their nation with a human sacrifice, because each victim represented Tuisto ('twin') and he was cut up to repeat the "acts of creation", which can be compared to how Odin and his brothers cut up the body of the primordial giant Ymir ('twin') to form the world in Norse mythology. Rudolf Simek notes that Tacitus also learnt that the Semnoni performed their rites at a holy grove that was their tribe's cradle and it could only be entered when they were fettered. The god who was worshiped was probably Odin, and being fettered may have been an imitation of Odin's self-sacrifice. This grove has for a long time been identified with the Grove of Fetters, where the hero was sacrificed to Odin in the Eddic poem, Helgakviða Hundingsbana II.

Simek notes, however, that the early Germanic seeresses were very secretive about their rituals when dealing with the Romans and we know very little of their practices.

== Sources ==
- Cassius Dio, Lucius (1925). Cary, Earnest (ed.). Dio Cassius: Roman History (Books 61–70). Loeb Classical Library 176. Vol. 8. William Heinemann; G.P. Putnam's. ISBN 9780674991958.
- Enright, M.J. (1996). Lady with a Mead Cup. Four Courts Press. ISBN 1-85182-188-0.
- Lincoln, Bruce (1986). Myth, Cosmos, and Society; Indo-European Themes of Creation and Destruction. Harvard University Press Cambridge, Massachusetts, and London. ISBN 0-674-59775-3.
- Reichert, Hermann; Timpe, Dieter (1998). "Ganna". In Beck, Heinrich; Geuenich, Dieter; Steuer, Heiko (eds.). Reallexikon der Germanischen Altertumskunde. Vol. 10 (2010 ed.). De Gruyter. doi:10.1515/gao. ISBN 978-3-11-045562-5.
- Reinach, Th.; Jullian, C. (1920). "Une sorcière germaine aux bords du Nil". Revue des Études Anciennes. 22 (2): 104–106. doi:10.3406/rea.1920.2105.
- Simek, Rudolf (1996). Dictionary of Northern Mythology. Translated by Angela Hall. Boydell & Brewer Ltd. ISBN 9780859915137.
- Simek, Rudolf (2020). "Encounters: Roman". In Schjødt, J.P; Lindow, J.; Andrén, A. (eds.). The Pre-Christian Religions of the North, History and Structures. Vol. I. Brepols. pp. 269–288. ISBN 978-2-503-57491-2.
- Sundqvist, Olof (2020). "Cultic Leaders and Religious Specialists". In Schjødt, J.P.; Lindow, J.; Andrén, A. (eds.). The Pre-Christian Religions of the North, History and Structures. Vol. II. Brepols. pp. 739–780. ISBN 978-2-503-57491-2.
- de Vries, Jan (1970). Altgermanische Religionsgeschichte. Vol. I. Berlin: de Gruyter. doi:10.1515/9783110865486. ISBN 978-3-11-002678-8.
- de Vries, Jan (1962). Altnordisches Etymologisches Worterbuch (2000 ed.). Brill. ISBN 90 04 05436 7.

== Other works ==
- Walter Baetke: Die Religion der Germanen in Quellenzeugnissen. 3. Auflage. Moritz Diesterweg, Frankfurt/M. 1944.
- Schröder, Franz Rolf (1933). Quellenbuch zur germanischen Religionsgeschichte. Leipzig: de Gruyter. ISBN 9783112019337.
- Sabine Tausend: Germanische Seherinnen. In: Klaus Tausend: Im Inneren Germaniens – Beziehungen zwischen den germanischen Stämmen vom 1. Jh. v. Chr. bis zum 2. Jh. n. Chr. Verlag Franz Steiner, Stuttgart 2009, ISBN 978-3-515-09416-0, S. 155–174 (Geographica Historica. Band 25).
