= Waluburg =

2nd century Germanic sorceress

- Born: First century? Semnonia (modern Germany)
- Died: Second century?
- Burial place: Roman Egypt?
- Occupation(s): Sorceress, priestess, seer
- Religion: Germanic paganism
- Offices held: Probably employed as a seeress at Elephantine, Egypt

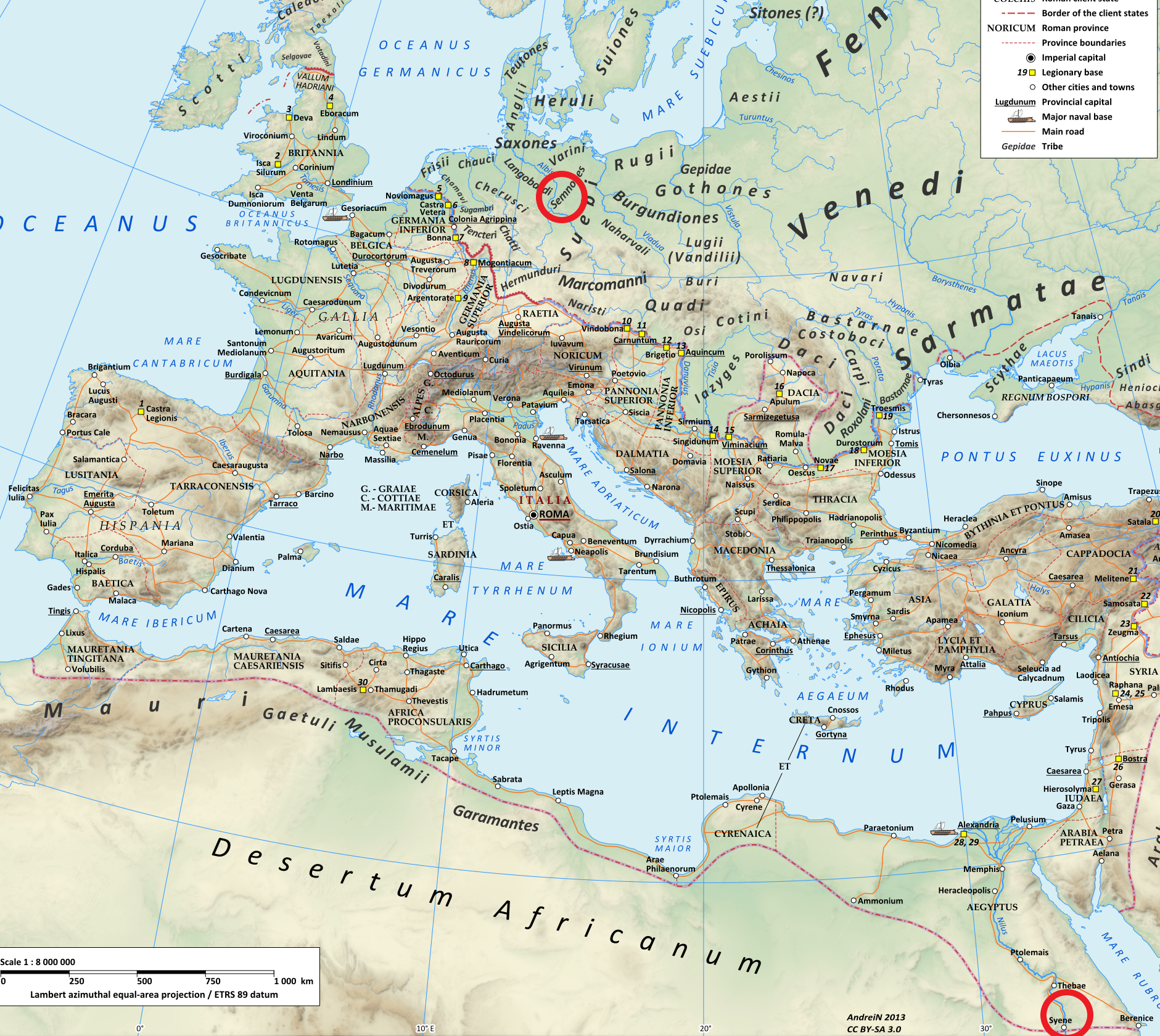
The seeress Waluburg was born among the Semnones (top circle), but she is remembered by an inscription found on the island of Elephantine (bottom circle).

Waluburg, 'magic staff protection' (Greek: Βαλουβουργ), was a second century Germanic seeress (sorceress, priestess) from the Semnonian tribe whose existence was revealed by the archaeological find of an ostracon, a pot shard of the type that was used by scribes to write receipts in Roman Egypt. The shard was discovered in the early twentieth century on the Egyptian island of Elephantine, near the First Cataract of the Nile.

Waluburg probably was taught her craft by a fellow tribeswoman, the seeress Ganna, who succeeded Veleda as a leader of the Germanic resistance against the Romans and who is known to have had an audience with emperor Domitian.

The reason how and why Waluburg ended up in southern Egypt at the First Cataract of the Nile is not known, but scholars speculate that she may have arrived while accompanying a warband of her own tribe in Roman service, that she was a war prisoner, or that she was a valuable hostage. Since Germanic sorceresses were known to make predictions of the future based on the movement of water, alternatively, she may have been hired by the Roman authorities to make predictions for them while studying the streams and currents of the First Cataract, hence the receipt of payment for services found with her name upon the shard found at Elephantine.

== Etymology of Waluburg ==
The first element *Walu- is probably Proto-Germanic *waluz 'staff', which could be a reference to the seeresses' insignia, the magic staff, and which connects her name semantically to that of her fellow tribeswoman, the seeress Ganna, who probably taught her the craft, and who had an audience with emperor Domitian in Rome. In the same way, her name may also be connected to the name of another Germanic seeress, Gambara, which can be interpreted as 'staff bearer' (*gand-bera or *gand-bara), see gandr. The staffs are also reflected in the North Germanic word for seeress, vǫlva 'staff bearer'. In North Germanic accounts, the seeresses were always equipped with a staff, a vǫlr, the Old Norse form of the same Proto-Germanic word *waluz.

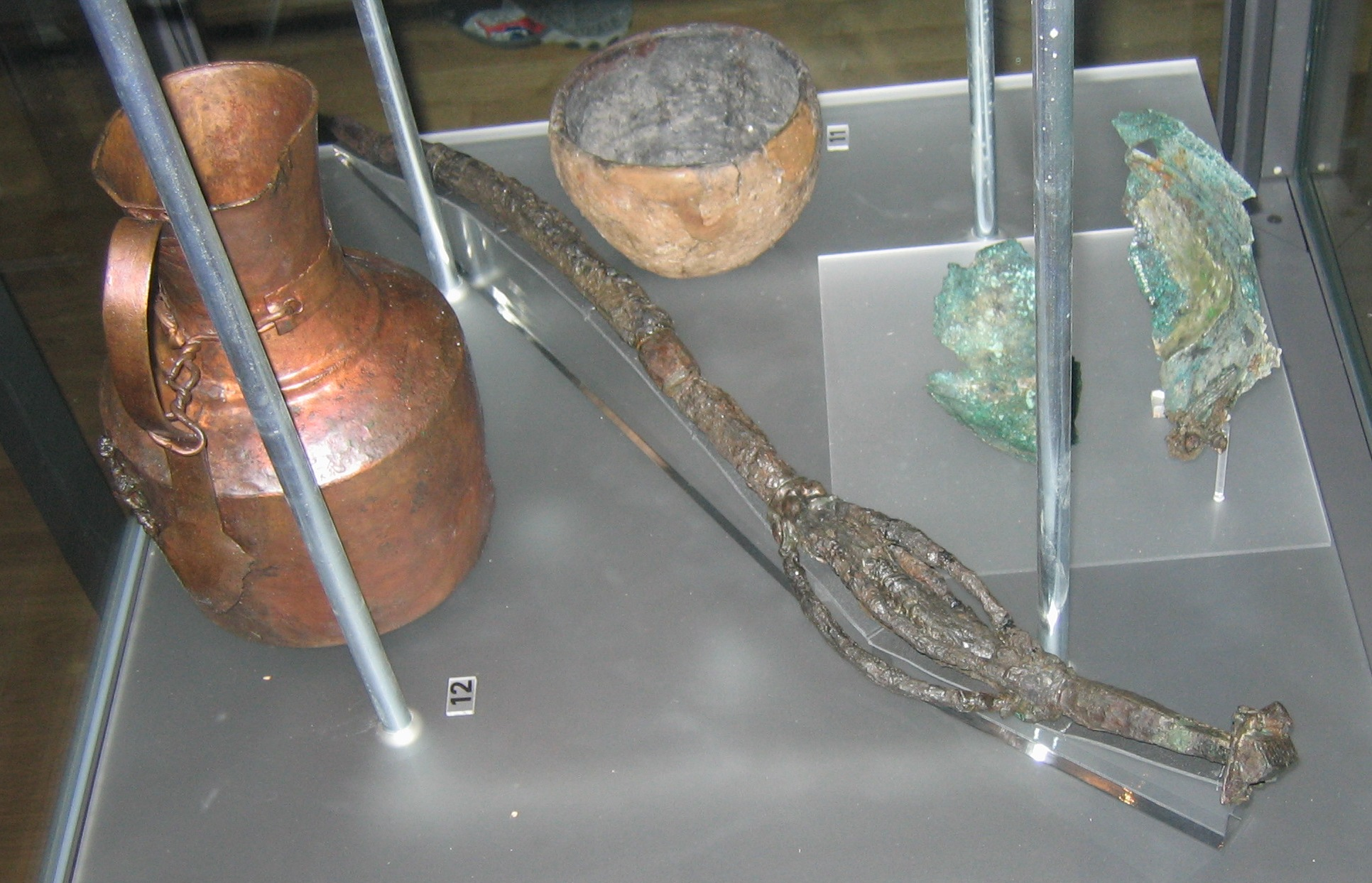
The staff from Klinta – from a grave of a sorceress, or a priestess, in the Swedish History Museum

The second element -burg is otherwise not attested in Germanic personal names before the 7th century, and there were some linguistic and gender related issues attached to it, which made its use in female names problematic and delayed its use. There were two feminine ablaut grades, *bergō which meant 'help' and *burgō which meant 'protection', but saving and protecting was the role of the man, while the role of the woman was to be the object a man's protection. However, women with supernatural powers could legitimately be agents of protection and consequently the name element -*bergō could have been coined in contexts where a supernatural woman, like a Valkyrie, helped and protected men fallen in battle. It was also an apt element in a name for a shield-maiden. So it was no coincidence that the name element -*bergō 'help' was first used in a female name with the first element *gunþi- 'fight', as in the name of the Lombard princess Gundiberga, the daughter of king Agilulf.

The reason why the ablaut grade -*burgō 'protection' was used in Waluburg instead of the grade -*bergō 'help' may have been because at this early time *bergō could not be uncontroversially added to *waluz because it was connected to a masculine noun that meant 'mountain' (*berg-). The grade -*burgō 'protection' was possible on the other hand because it was connected to a female noun meaning 'fortress' (*burgz), and in this way gender associations and sensitivities would have been respected. Constraints in name formation removed the final -ō and produced Waluburg.

== The ostracon ==
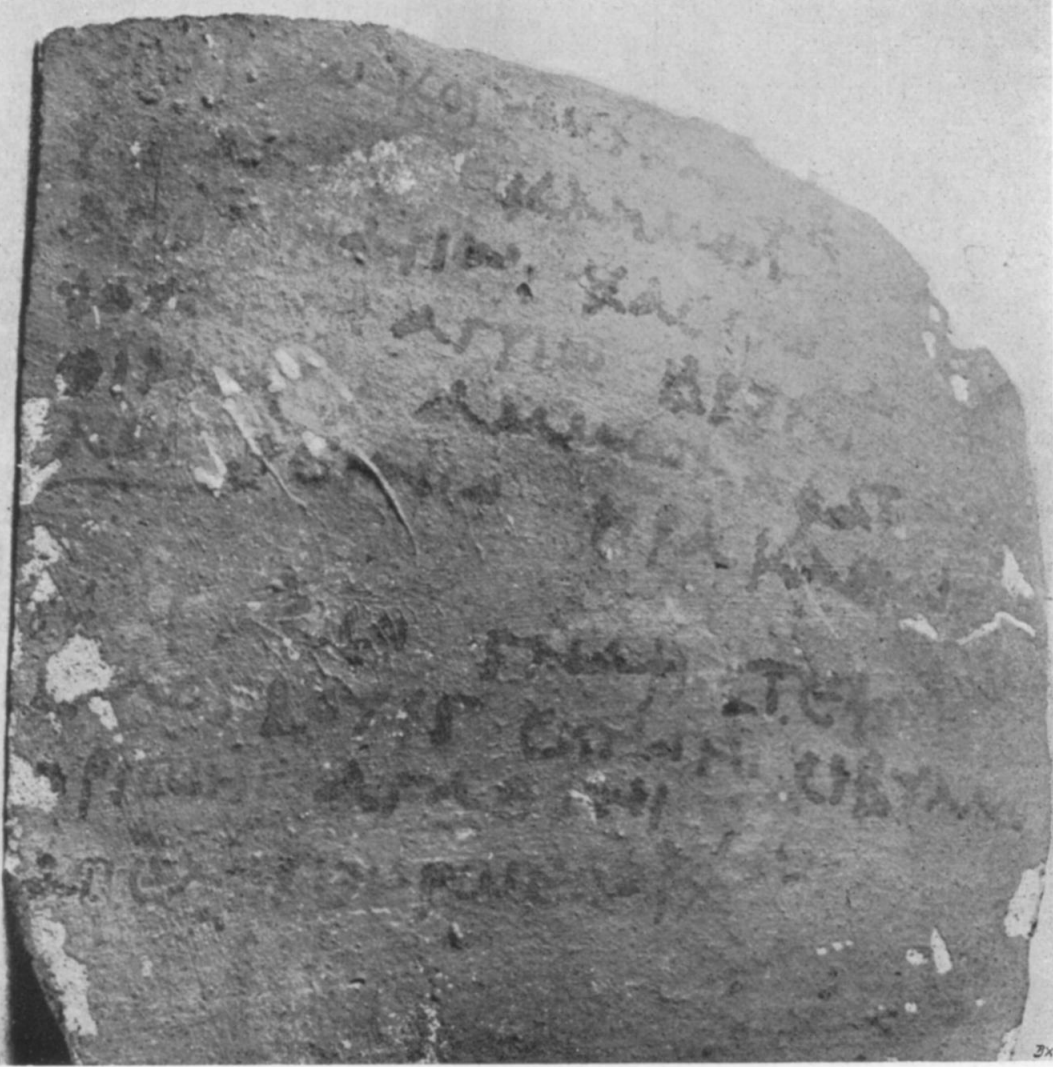
The ostracon – the relevant text appears on the third line from the bottom

Her name was discovered on an ostracon, a potshard fragment of a type that was used as a receipt in Roman Egypt. It is dated to the second century AD and it was found on the island of Elephantine opposite Aswan (Syene) at the southern Egyptian border. It was first described by Wilhelm Schubart in 1917, and he noted that the text was faded and the writing was school-like, but her name, Waluburg, was clearly legible. The shard contains a list of Greek and Roman names in the dative case, noting that they are recipients, perhaps of a salary. They are mentioned in ten lines of titles and personal names. Above a broad line is listed the title ἔπαρχος, which translates as either 'the governor' (praefectus Aegypti) or a 'legionary prefect' (praefectus legionis), and κορνουκλαρι, for the Latin corniculari 'adjutants, etc.'. Then it says three centurions but written with acronyms, then one or more scribes, and after that one or several dromedarii, camel riders, of whom there were two alae stationed in the region. Below the dividing line it lists proper names and civilian occupations, such as γναθεύς 'cloth fuller' (but misspelt as κναθεύς). Among the proper names are such that were usually given to servants and slaves, so it lists the members of a group of people occupied in service to the Roman governor.

Among the names for the civilians appears Βαλουβουργ Σήνονι σιβύλλᾳ, in line 8, and it clearly sticks out among the Latin, Greek, and Egyptian names on the ostraca, and unlike them, it was not written with a grammatical case marker. This is unusual because the scribes who wrote the ostraca added Greek case markers even to Egyptian names.

== Analysis ==
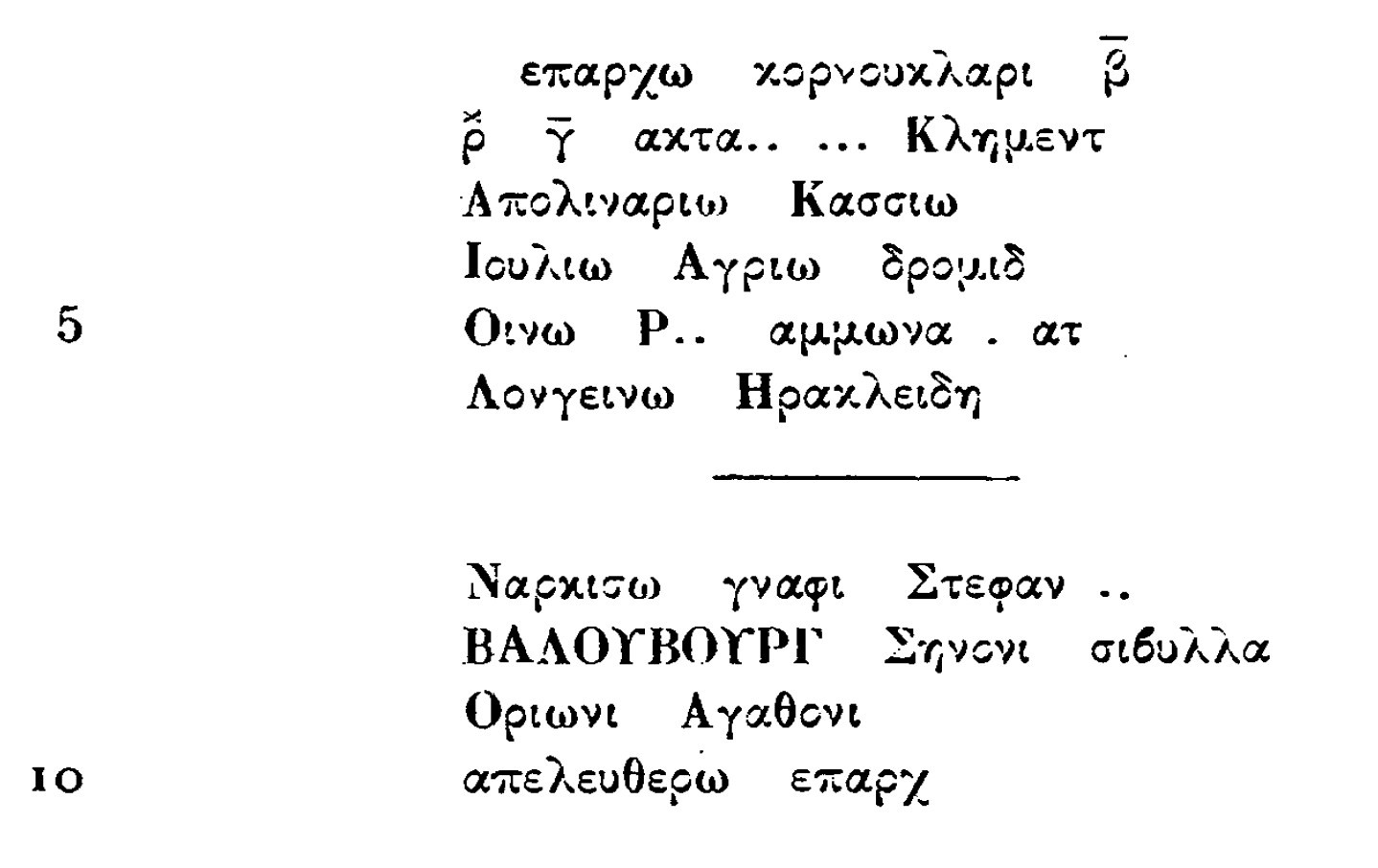
The text as rendered by Reinach and Jullian 1920 – the name Waluburg has been highlighted with capital letters

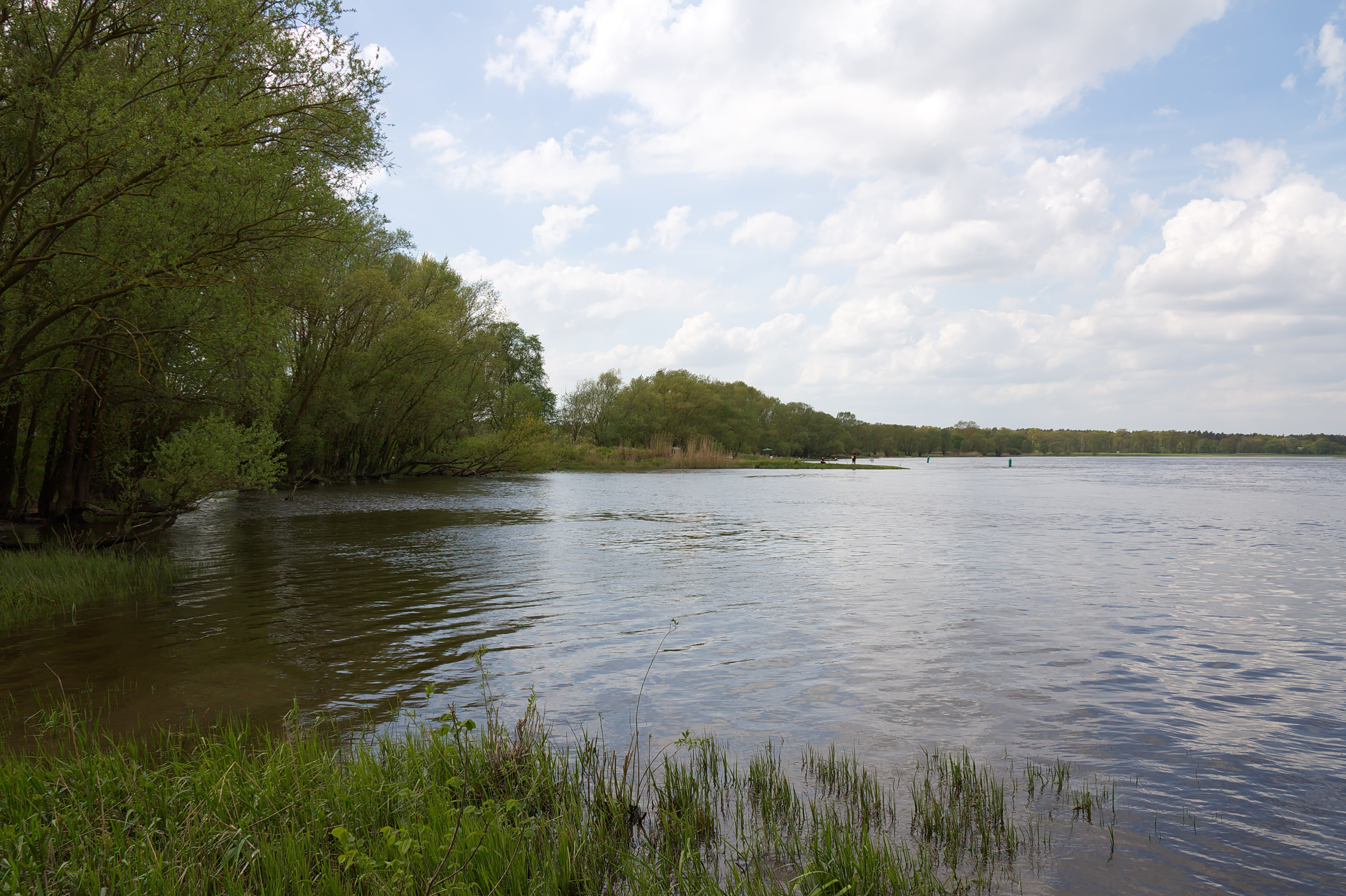
The river Elbe, at Gorleben, Germany

Since the scribes also wrote names phonetically, it was clear to Schubart that the foreign name represented a feminine Germanic name. Schubart transcribed it as Baloubourg, but he identified it as Walburg, then a rare feminine Germanic name that appears in Walpurgis Night. However, Simek comments that Schubart was mistaken about this because Walburg is derived from Wald-burga, and is an entirely different name. Schubart also noted that the Senones were a Celtic tribe that poorly fits a woman with a Germanic name, and the reference was also anachronistic since that Celtic tribe had been subdued by Caesar during his Gallic campaigns in the first century BC. He concluded that it was more likely that the Germanic tribe Semnones had been mistaken for the Celtic Senones known from Roman history, than it was for a woman with a Germanic name to have identified with a long defunct Celtic tribe.

Schröder (1918) read the text as "Walburg, the Semnonic sibyl" and considered Semnonic to be a cultic name rather than an ethnonym, while Helm (1918) read her name as Waluburg and suggested that it was a title rather than a proper name. Reichert (1987) lists her name without elaboration as Baluburg in his Lexikon der altgermanischen Namen, but as Waluburg in his article Frau in Reallexikon der Germanischen Altertumskunde (1995). Simek writes her name as Waluborg and adds that Senoni is clearly the tribal name Semnoni but misspelled.

Reinach and Jullian (1920) write that undoubtedly, Waluburg had been taught the craft by the famous Ganna, a fellow tribeswoman to Waluburg, and they finish their paper by asking what series of adventures such as those of a novel could have brought this blonde woman from the Elbe to the swirls of the First Cataract of the Nile?

La Βαλουβουργ de notre tesson, dont le nom, transcrit Walburg par M. Schubart, évoque la nuit de Walpurgis, était sans doute une des élèves de la fameuse Ganna. Quelle suite romanesque d'aventures amena la blonde fille de l'Elbe jusqu'aux tourbillons de la première cataracte du Nil? «Admirable sujet à mettre en vers latins...», si l'on en faisait encore.

== The First Cataract ==
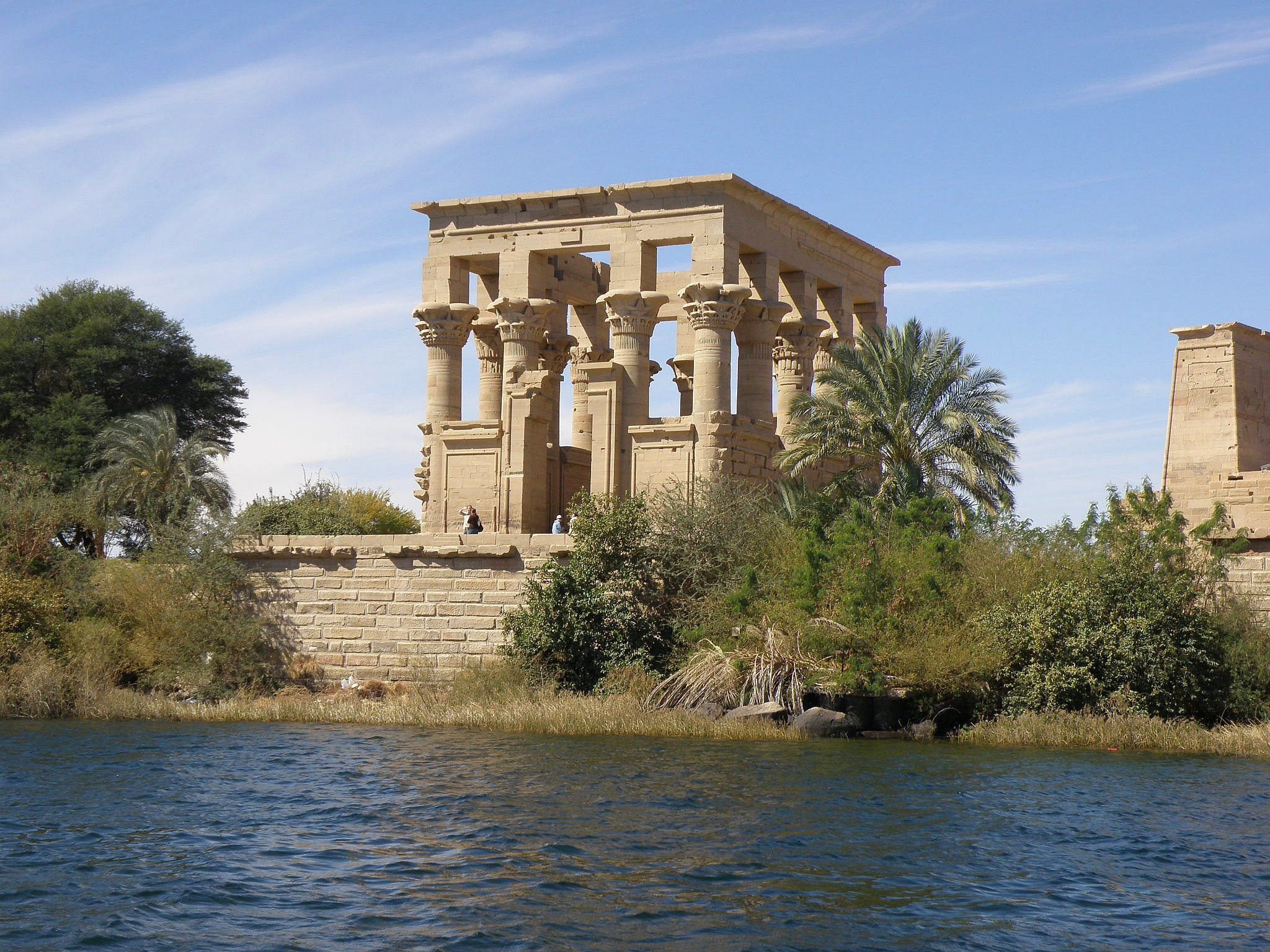
Syene, in Egypt

Schubart suggests that Waluburg may have accompanied Germanic auxiliary troops who were sent to the southern Egyptian border. During the Byzantine era, Germanic troops appear to have been stationed there, which is shown by the find of a fragment of the Gothic Bible in Egypt, and seeresses often accompanied Germanic troops. Enright considers it unlikely for her to have arrived at the location unless she followed a warband of auxiliary troops of her own tribe, and perhaps, the seeresses Veleda, Aurinia, and Ganna often accompanied the troops of their warlords. However, although, there are abundant records of Germanic troops in Egypt and three cohorts in Syene in the fourth and fifth centuries, there is no evidence of a Germanic garrison in Syene during the first and the second centuries AD. Consequently, it has been suggested that the ostracon is from a later time, but the ethnonym, or cult name, Semnones did not survive the seonnd century, and it was last attested in 179/180 AD by Cassius Dio.

It also is unlikely that Waluburg served in one of the temples on the island.

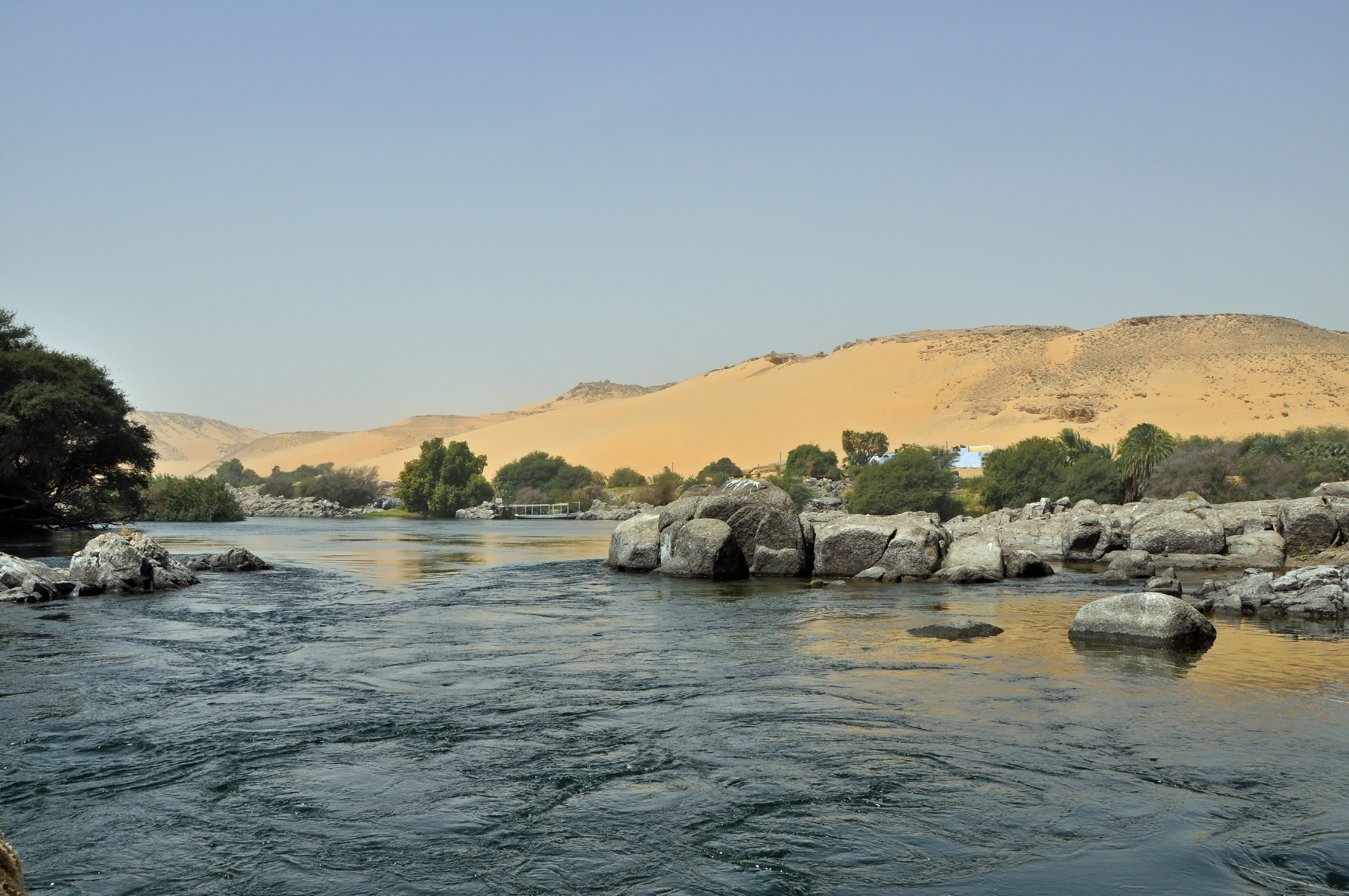
The swirls of the First Cataract of the Nile

Schubart also proposes that Waluburg may also have been a war prisoner accompanying a Roman soldier in his career that led to his being stationed in Egypt at the first cataract. Simek considers her to have been deported by the Roman authorities, and he writes that it is uncertain how she arrived at Elephantine, but it is not surprising considering the significant and obvious influence that the Germanic seeresses wielded politically. She also may have been a valued hostage who eventually would have been returned to her people (cf. Germania 8), and perhaps future finds of papyri will clarify this.

Reichert considers her to have been hired by the Roman governor, as the Romans appreciated the prophetic skills of the Germanic seeresses. Clement of Alexandria, who lived in Egypt at the same time as Waluburg, and the earlier Plutarch, mentioned that the Germanic seeresses also could predict the future while studying the eddies, the whirling and the splashing of currents, and this may be the reason why Waluburg found herself on the island of Elephantine within hearing distance of the swirling waters of the First Cataract of the Nile.

== Sources ==
- Enright, M.J. (1996). Lady with a Mead Cup. Four Courts Press. ISBN 1-85182-188-0.
- Förstemann, Ernst (1900). Altdeutsches Namenbuch, Band 1: Personennamen (2 ed.). Bonn.
- Morris, Katherine (1991). Sorceress Or Witch?: The Image of Gender in Medieval Iceland and Northern Europe. University Press of America. ISBN 978-0-8191-8257-9.
- Okamura, Lawrence (1995). "Germanic seeresses through Roman eyes". Classica - Revista Brasileira de Estudos Clássicos. 7: 285–299. doi:10.24277/classica.v7i0.678. S2CID 165200223.
- Orel, Vladimir E. (2003). A Handbook of Germanic Etymology. Brill. ISBN 978-90-04-12875-0.
- Price, Neil (2019). The Viking Way, Magic and Mind in Late Iron Age Scandinavia (2 ed.). Oxbow Books, Oxford and Philadelphia. ISBN 978-1-84217-260-5.
- Reichert, Hermann (1995). "Frau". In Beck, Heinrich; Geuenich, Dieter; Steuer, Heiko (eds.). Reallexikon der Germanischen Altertumskunde. Vol. 9 (2010 ed.). De Gruyter. doi:10.1515/gao. ISBN 978-3-11-045562-5.
- Reinach, Th.; Jullian, C. (1920). "Une sorcière germaine aux bords du Nil". Revue des Études Anciennes. 22 (2): 104–106. doi:10.3406/rea.1920.2105.
- Schramm, Gottfried (2013). "VI. Anläufe zu eigenständigen Frauennamen". Zweigliedrige Personennamen der Germanen. Ein Bildetyp als gebrochener Widerschein früher Heldenlieder. Reallexikon der Germanischen Altertumskunde – Ergänzungsbände. Vol. 82. De Gruyter. ISBN 978-3-11-032444-0.
- Schubart, W. (1917). "Ägyptische Abteilung (Papyrussammlung)". Amtliche Berichte aus den Königlichen Kunstsammlungen. 38 (12). Staatliche Museen zu Berlin – Preußischer Kulturbesitz: 7–12. JSTOR 4235200.
- Simek, Rudolf (1996). Dictionary of Northern Mythology. Translated by Angela Hall. Boydell & Brewer Ltd. ISBN 978-0-85991-513-7.
- Simek, Rudolf (2020). "Encounters: Roman". In Schjødt, J.P; Lindow, J.; Andrén, A. (eds.). The Pre-Christian Religions of the North, History and Structures. Vol. I. Brepols. pp. 269–288. ISBN 978-2-503-57491-2.
- Sundqvist, Olof (2020). "Cultic Leaders and Religious Specialists". In Schjødt, J.P.; Lindow, J.; Andrén, A. (eds.). The Pre-Christian Religions of the North, History and Structures. Vol. II. Brepols. pp. 739–780. ISBN 978-2-503-57491-2.
- de Vries, Jan (1970). Altgermanische Religionsgeschichte. Vol. I. Berlin: de Gruyter. doi:10.1515/9783110865486. ISBN 978-3-11-002678-8.
