= Haliurunas =

Type of witch in Germanic paganism

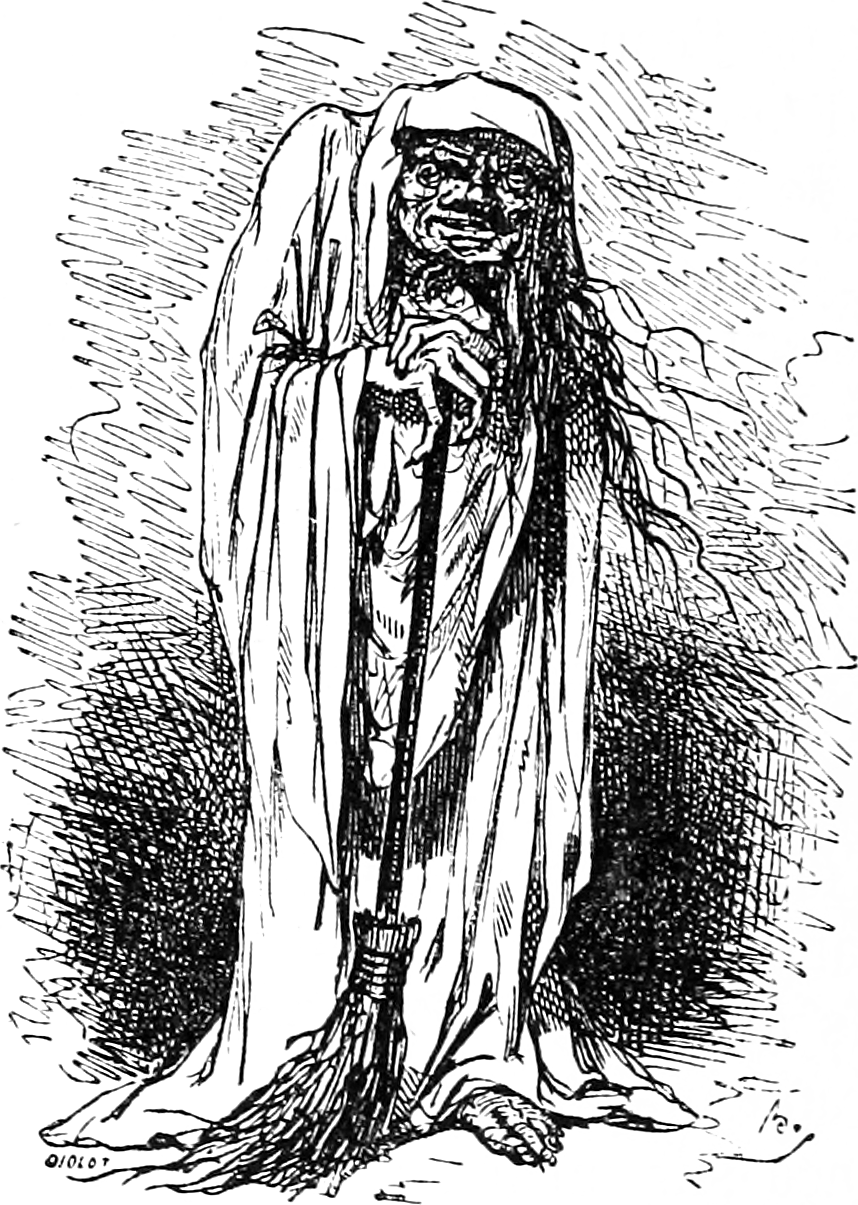
A depiction for the entry Aliorumnas by Louis Le Breton in the Dictionnaire Infernal 1863, p. 20.

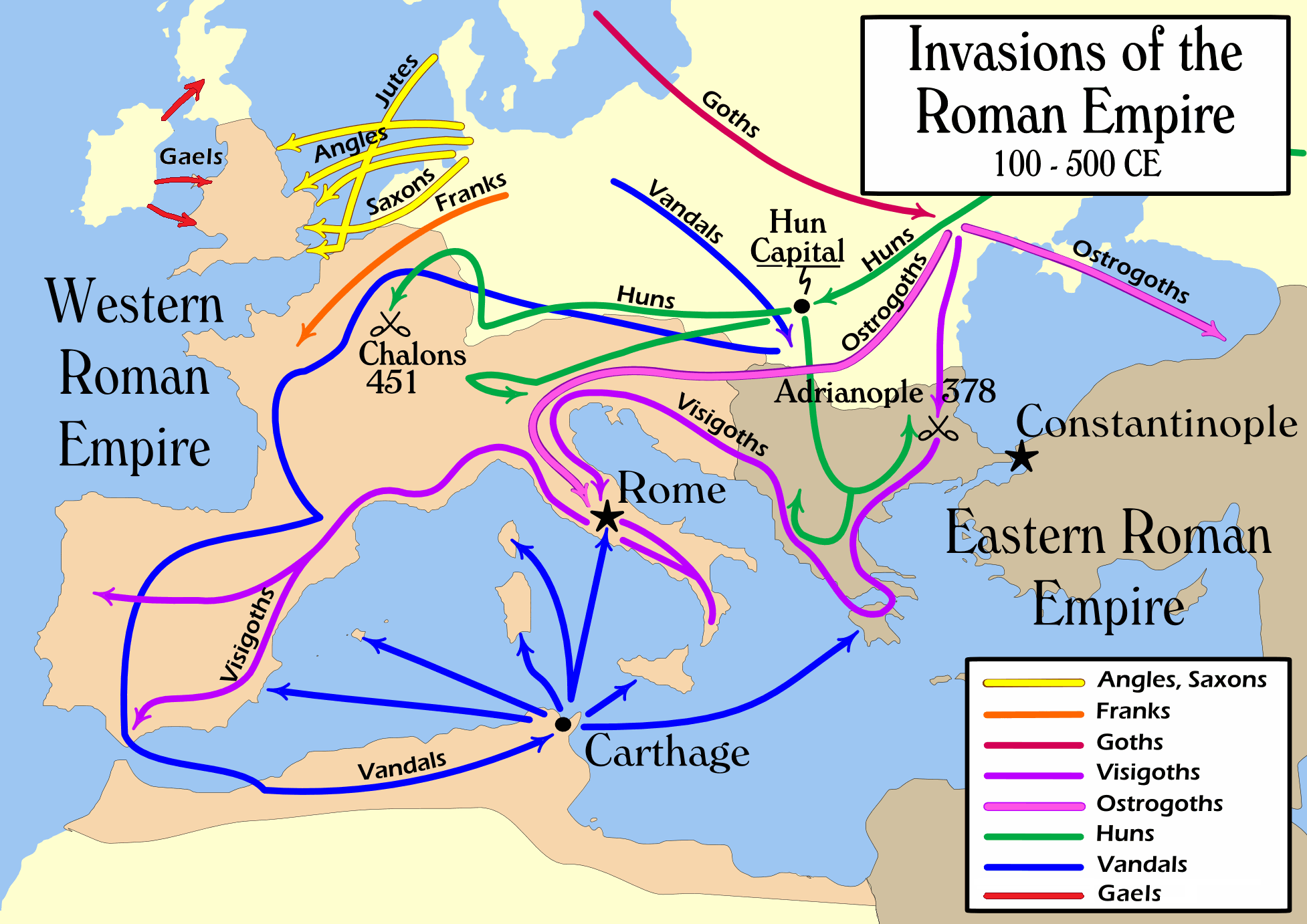
Migrations before and during the fall of the Roman Empire. The account takes place when the Goths had settled north of the Black Sea.

Haliurunas, haljarunae, Haliurunnas, haliurunnae, etc., were Gothic "witches" (also called priestesses, seeresses, shamans or wise women) who appear once in Getica, a 6th-century work on Gothic history. The account tells that the early Goth king Filimer found witches among his people when they had settled north of the Black Sea, and that he banished them to exile. They were impregnated by unclean spirits and engendered the Huns, and the account is a precursor of later Christian traditions where wise women were alleged to have sexual intercourse and even orgies with demons and the Devil.

The term has cognates, or close cognates, in both Old English and Old High German, which shows that it had an old history in Gothic culture and paganism and originates in Proto-Germanic. The account may be based on a historic event c. 200 AD, when the Goths had won a critical and decisive victory and a new royal clan asserted its power, and the priestesses were banished for opposing the new royal ancestor cult. In connection to this, they may also have been banished by their king in order to take over their riches. Another reason may have been blaming them as scapegoats for having caused a defeat against enemies by predicting the wrong outcome.

== Etymology ==
The name has been emended as the Goth-Latin forms haliurunnas, or haljarunae (and variations of the two forms) from several variants in the ms, i.e. aliorumnas, alyrumnas, aliorunas and aliuruncas. The first element halju- is a variant of halja- 'Hell' (i.e. 'Hel, the abode of the dead'), but it has also been suggested that the first element does not refer to the realm of the dead, but instead directly to Hel, the goddess of the dead. Scardigli (1973) has analysed the second element as runnas, from *rinnan 'to run', and so the word would mean 'hell runners', i.e. female shamans. Lehmann (1986) considers this analysis preferable to Müllenhoff's who analyzed it as haljo-runas and compared it to OHG holz-rûna 'witch'.

However, others are of the same opinion as Müllenhoff, and analyse the second element as runas, and so it is considered to be cognate with Old English, hellerune ('seeress' or 'witch') and OHG hellirûna ('necromancy') and hellirunari ('necromancer'). Orel follows this interpretation and reconstructs it as the Proto-Germanic form *χalja-rūnō(n) in which the first element is *χaljō 'hel, the abode of the dead', and the second is *rūnō ('mystery, secret').

During Proto-Germanic times, the word *rūnō still referred to chanting and not to letters (rune), and in the sense 'incantation' it was probably borrowed from Proto-Germanic into Finnish where runo means 'poem'.

Klaeber and Niles et al. write the Latin-Gothic word as haljarunae and comment that the word appears in Beowulf in hwyder helrūnan where it means 'such demons', and it shows that the word would have been helrūne in the nominative singular. Neidorf adds that the use of the word in Beowulf supports the early 8th century dating of the poem, because besides the unambiguous attestation in the 6th century Getica (haljarunae), it is only attested in the 8th century Aldhelmian glosses, where it appears five times. The word is glossed consistently as divinatrix ('seeress') and phitonissa ('witch'), and twice wicca ('witch') is listed as a synonym. The appearance of the word in these early sources shows that in the 8th century helrūne and wicca were competing terms, but helrūne was out-competed very early in the Anglo-Saxon language and so the word wicca dominates with 28 attestations.

Lukman (1949) argued that Cassiodorus was inspired by a Roman account about a Germanic seeress whose name appeared in the form Auriniam, but the word haliurunna is generally considered to be an authentic Gothic word.

== Account ==
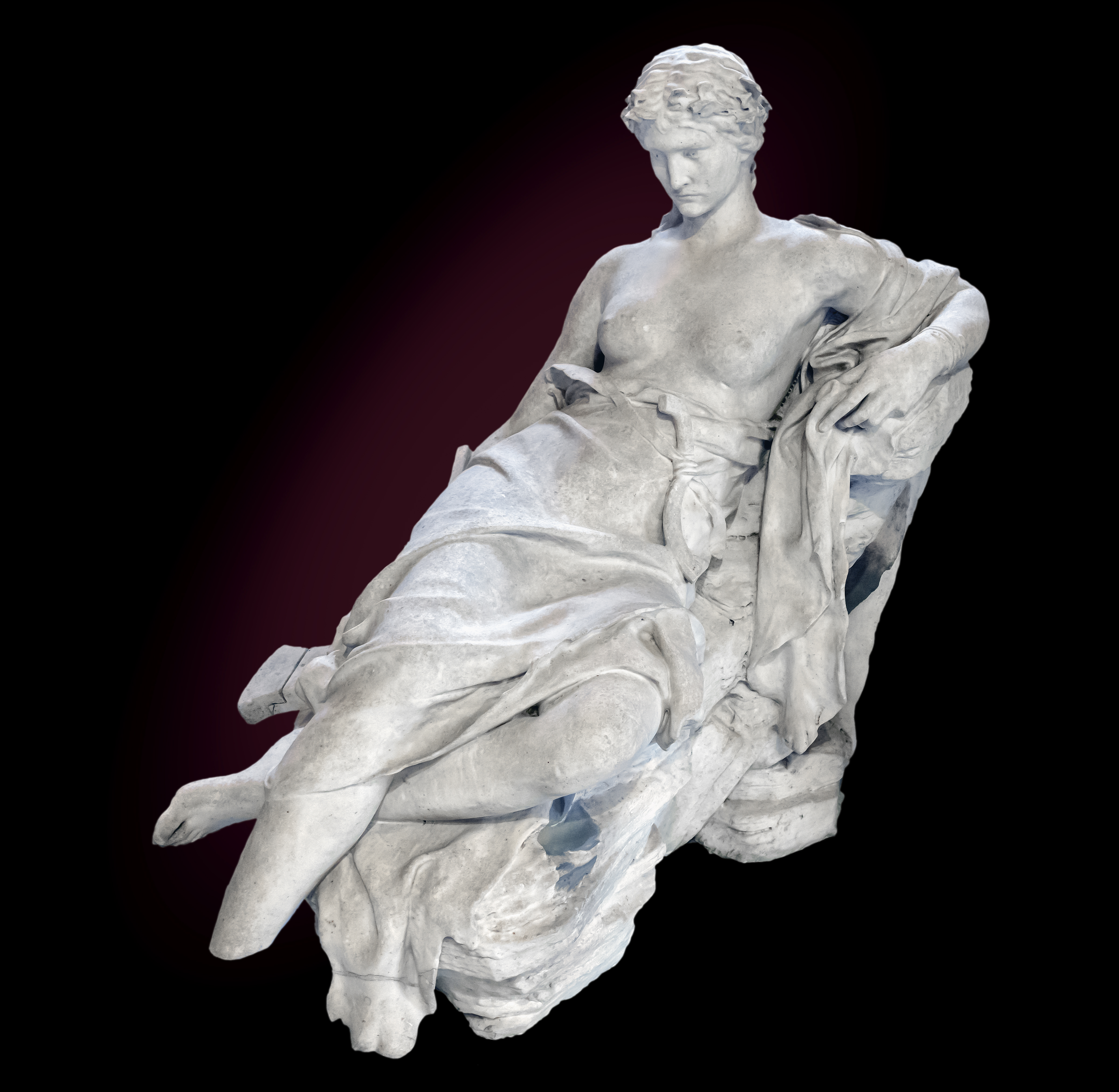
A statue of Veleda, a bructerian counterpart who wielded considerable political power and lead the Germanic resistance against the Romans.

Sixth century Goth scholar Jordanes reported in his Getica that the early Goths had called their seeresses haliurunnae (Goth-Latin). They were in the words of Wolfram "women who engaged in magic with the world of the dead", and they were banished from their tribe by Filimer who was the last pre-Amal dynasty king of the migrating Goths.

We learn from old traditions that their origin was as follows : Filimer, king of the Goths, son of Gadaric the Great, who was the fifth in succession to hold the rule of the Getae after their departure from the island of Scandza — and who, as we have said, entered the land of Scythia with his tribe — found among his people certain witches, whom he called in his native tongue Haliurunnae. Suspecting these women, he expelled them from the midst of his race and compelled them to wander in solitary exile afar from his army. There the unclean spirits, who beheld them as they wandered through the wilderness, bestowed their embraces upon them and begat this savage race, which dwelt at first in the swamps, a stunted, foul and puny tribe, scarcely human and having no language save one which bore but slight resemblance to human speech. Such was the descent of the Huns who came to the country of the Goths. (Mierow's translation).

The Haliurunnae found refuge in the wilderness where they were impregnated by unclean spirits from the Steppe, and engendered the Huns, which Pohl compares with the origin of the Sarmatians as presented by Herodotus. The account serves as an explanation for the origins of the Huns.

== Historical background ==
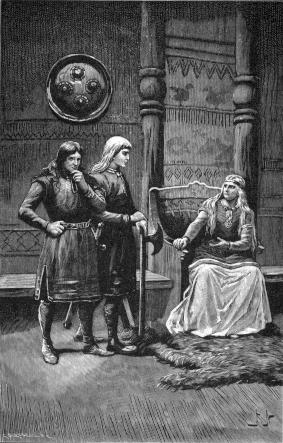
The Scandinavian heroic poem Hamðismál preserves some of the same Gothic traditions as the Getica.

Suggesting that the account is not authentic, Goffart has proposed the following conversation between Cassiodorus, making up stories, and his Goth saio adjutant:

"By the way, Giberich, how does one say 'witch' in your language?" "That's 'haliurunna,' sir." "Thank you, Giberich. I don't suppose you know whether it takes two n's or one?" "No, sir."

Pohl is critical towards Goffart's approach and writes that he has "led an insistent campaign against all sorts of oral traditions and pagan lore" and comments that the discipline of cultural anthropology shows that most peoples have traditions of their distant past, although not exactly as they happened. In most countries in the world, even in Boston, Massachusetts and in Vienna, people do indeed have oral traditions that go back several centuries to attested historical events, such as the American Revolution and the Battle of Vienna (1683). Pohl adds that it is commonly assumed in contemporary mediaeval studies that such stories contribute to the shaping of ethnic identities, and he dates the Halirunnae legend to post-375 (see the Christianization of the Goths).

Wolfram considers that historically the banishment would have happened in the 2nd century, but it was repeatedly retold and renewed for four centuries until it was written down in the 6th century. Cassiodorus who wrote down the first version used the Old Testament as a model, but he included authentic Gothic elements like the name Oium for what today is Ukraine, and haliurun(n)ae, which is a Gothic word but with a Latin ending. He also preserved other Gotic pre-Amal dynasty and pre-ethnographic information, some of which was also preserved in the Scandinavian eddic heroic poem Hamðismál.

=== Cultic and dynastic shift ===
A pagan society banished people who had used sorcery to violate norms, and so the women performed rites that were either not yet accepted or had ceased being so. It is possible that the migrating Goths encountered new shamanistic rites when they reached the Black Sea c. 200 AD, but it is also possible that the Gothic elite decided to enforce a change in cult.

Wolfram (2006) compares the account with the Lombard legend of Gambara of the Vinnili (early Lombards) which begins in a Vanir context, where two brothers are directed by a wise and divinely inspired woman. She is a priestess who invokes and receives help from the Vanir goddess Fre(yi)a, when her tribe is threatened by the more numerous Vandals. He comments that Fre(yi)a is portrayed as the wife of Godan (Odin), and this role normally belongs to the Aesir goddess Frigg, but he considers correct the view that she and several other goddess are versions of Freyja. Both the Vinnili and the Vandals were ready to transform themselves into more successful model of a migrating army, and consequently to reject their old Vanir (fertility) cult and embrace Odin as their leader. It is the women that sacrifice their past and their traditional cult in order to save their tribe under the leadership of their priestess Gambara and their goddess Freyja. They pave the way for their men's victory and they legitimize the transformation into a new tribe, the Lombards.

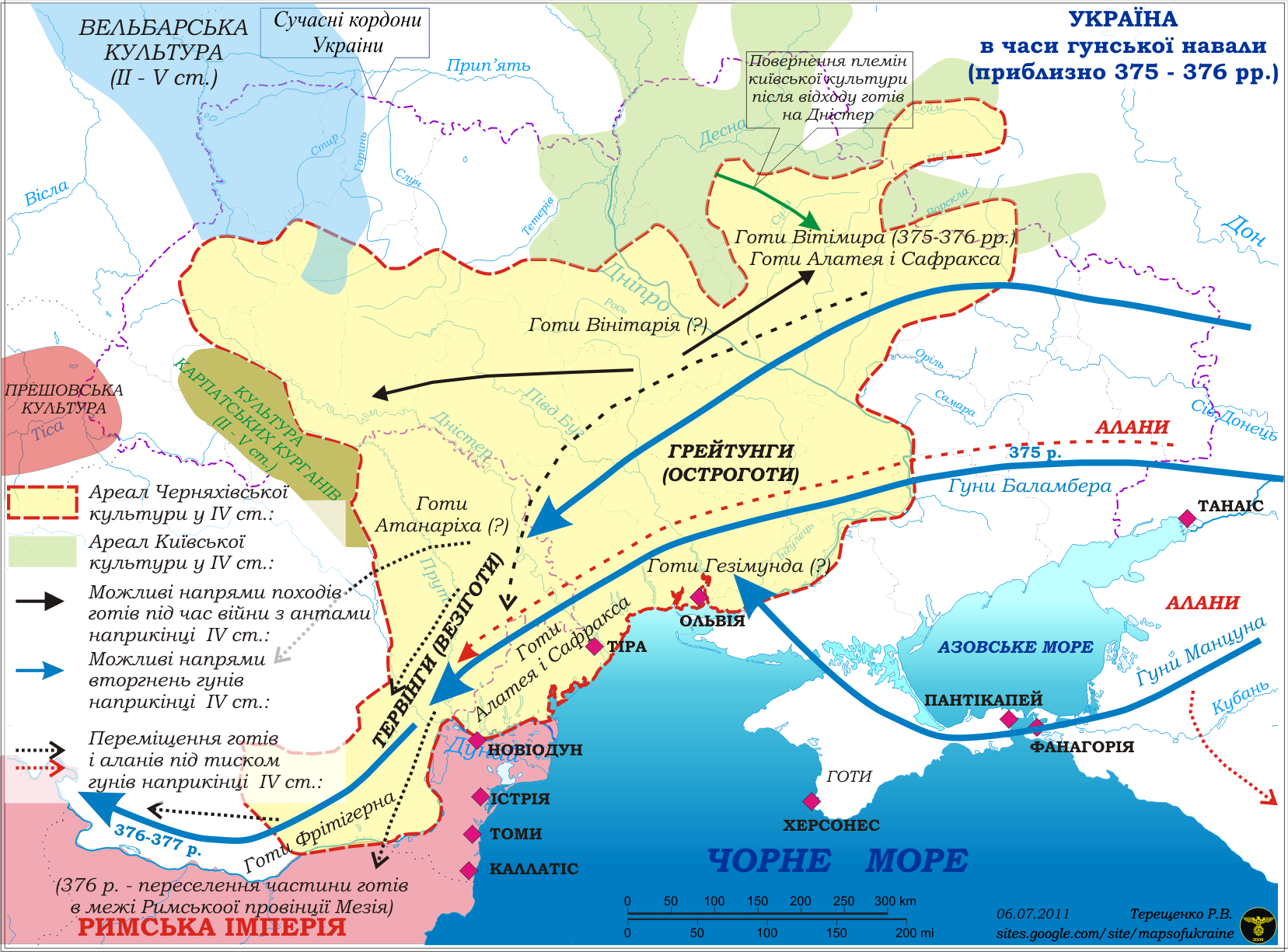
The Chernyakhov culture, which corresponds to the Gothic settlement, in the 4th c. The blue lines show the Hunnic invasions.

He argues that Gambara's Gothic counterparts may have instead represented the conservative faction and resisted change. This change may have been the rise of the Amal clan and their claims of ancestry from the anses (the Aesir clan of gods). As in the case of the early Lombards, this would have taken place after a decisive victory that saved a tribe whose existence had been threatened by enemies. Odin was still a new god, and the Goths worshiped instead the "old" god Gaut who was made the Scandinavian great-grandfather of Amal, the founder of the new ruling clan. The same decision was made by the royal family of Essex who had Geat (Gaut) precede Woden (Odin) as their ancestor. Also, the royal Yngling dynasty of Sweden claimed descendance from the god Yngvi-Freyr and the Swedish kings were his incarnations, and this was also the case of Gaut's descendants, the Amal clan.

=== Royal greed ===
In addition to cultic tensions surrounding the royal descent from the gods, the decision may also have been based on ambition and greed. Germanic seeresses received gifts for their services and the Gothic ones may have grown too rich and powerful. Their sanctuaries were probably prosperous, and it may have been too tempting to confiscate their riches which happened to the Oracle at Delphi in Greece. In Scandinavia much later, the Swedish king Gustav Wasa converted his country to Lutheranism and took over the properties of the Catholic Church, and in France king Philip V of France confiscated the riches of the Knights Templar.

=== Failed prophesying ===
Enright (1996) comments that the seeresses served the wishes and the interest of a Germanic warlord, like Filimer, by divination and the casting of lots, which is in fact a propaganda tool that is very sophisticated. A Germanic warlord could not depend on the troops' discipline like the Roman commanders, but as in the case of Ariovistus their troops could consist of bands men from six or seven tribes, who were not bound by a common tribal loyalty. Instead the firmness of purpose and morale of the Germanic armies depended on the warlord's reputation for success, cleverness and personal bravery. Even if the warriors' women were not present, the warlord could not retreat, without destroying his reputation and having his army abandon him. It was only the seeresses and their divination that gave him someone to blame for failure. When the warlord was successful, he reaped the glory, but when he failed, the seeresses could be blamed. This could very well have been the reason why Filimer banished his seeresses.

=== Christian influence ===
Maenchen-Helfen (1944) has argued that the account comes from a Christian tradition, but Wolfram (2006) answers that the word Haliurunnae is Gothic, and is derived neither from Christian nor Jewish texts, and it can have been invented by neither Cassiodorus nor Jordanes, but it was disguised in a Christian form. Wagner argues that the demonization of both the women and the Huns shows that the account was written in a Christian context. Morris (1991) comments that it was a precedent for future Christian tradition, where demonic women have intercourse with the Devil or with demons. In the Anglo-Saxon Leechbook from the 10th century, there is a prescription for a salve against "women with whom the Devil has sexual intercourse," and in the 11th century, there appeared the idea that witches and heretics had sexual orgies during their meetings at night.

== Beowulf ==
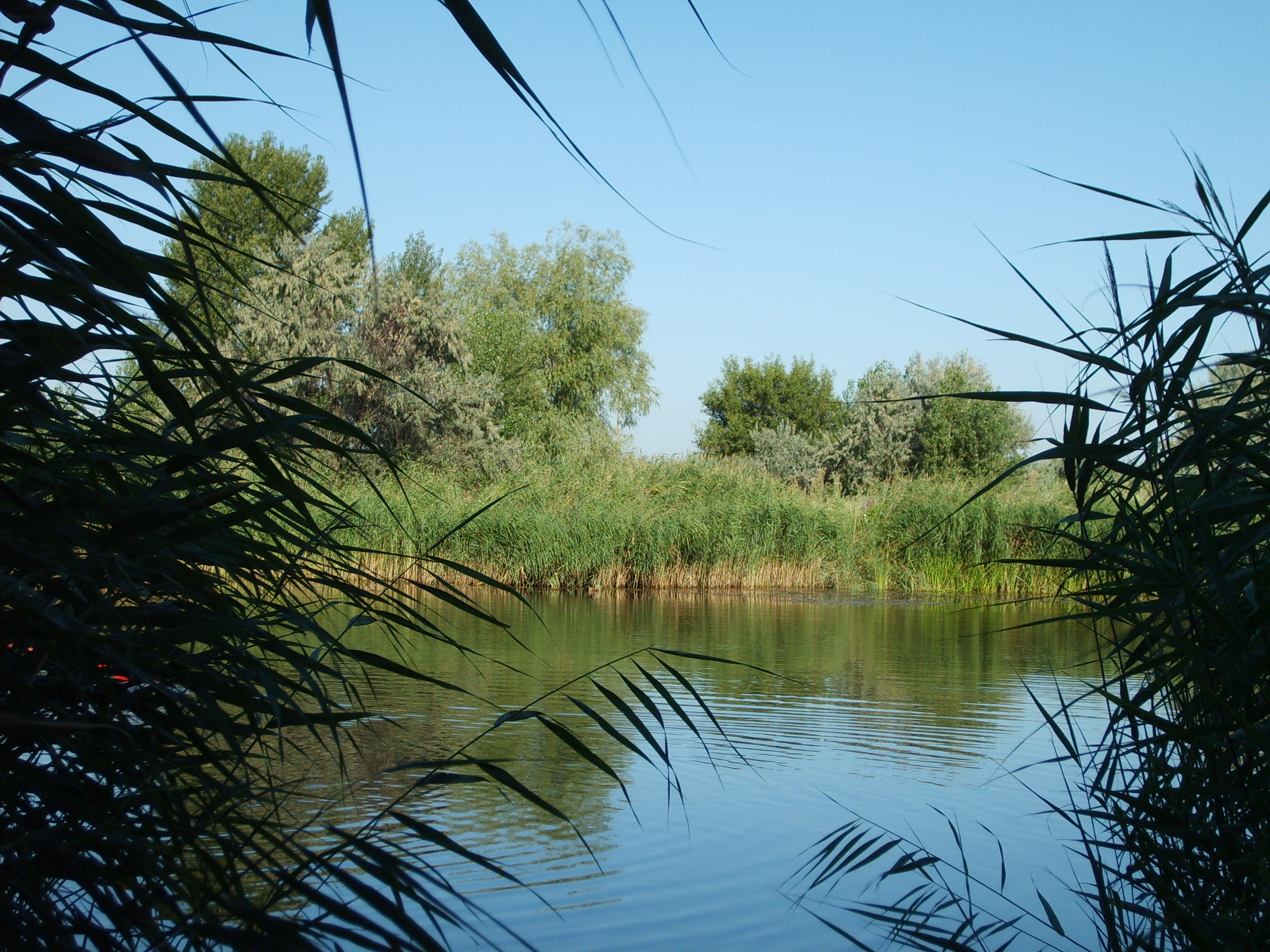
The Maeotian swamp.

Damico (1984) connects haliurunae, which she translates as 'demons' and 'sorceresses', to the word helrūnan, which is glossed as Valkyrie, as a grim spirit of battle, and that it also appears in Beowulf as a name for Grendel, and for his mother by implication. She points out similarities between the haliurunas — that "fierce and hellish tribe" — and Grendel and his mother. They were ravagers and raiders of the other tribes and they lived in the Maeotian Swamp, which was a "place of prohibition." In connection with this swamp, in the same account, there is an incident of a doe that is hesitant to enter the swamp, which appears to be a variation on the hart that is trapped with its hooves on the border of Grendel's mere (Beowulf lines 1368–1372). Damico further connects them to the supernatural female powers called dísir in Scandinavian tradition who were appeased by sacrifices and adds that after the attack by the helrūnan, the Danes sacrifice at heathen temples (hærgtrafum) with honours of war (weorþunga).

== Later influence ==
The story of the Halirunas appears to have become widely known in Europe. The Hungarian author Simon of Kéza, who considered the Huns to be the ancestors of the Hungarians, retold the story in 1282–1285, but he claimed not to believe in the account as it implied a taint in the ancestry of the Hungarians:

[Filimer] is said to have brought with him in his army many women, who were also called by the name of Balternae. They were dangerous to the army, for by their caresses they induced many soldiers to withdraw from fighting, so the king is said to have expelled them from the army. Wandering in the desert, they finally came upon the shore of the Maeotic swamp. Orosius says that while they stayed there a long time, deprived of marital comfort, demons came and lay with them. He says the Hungarians arose from this union. (McMahon's translation.)

In about 1486, Johannes de Thurocz changed the account and made the women into sorceresses and the demons into demi-gods. He claimed to use a text by Antoninus of Florence as a source, and Antoninus was said to have used Vincent and Sigilbert as sources:

[Filimer] found some sorceresses living among the people there, women who are called in Gothic "alirumnae," and because he suspected them he drove them from the midst of the people, forcing them to flee far away from his army and to wander in the desert. And some men of the forest, whom some call "murderous fauns" [faunos sicarios] (a race which, it is said, once encountered St. Anthony as he wandered in the desert as a hermit), when they saw these women wandering the byways of the desert, threw themselves into their embraces and had relations with them. From this came a fierce, dreadful and terrible race of men. (McMahon's translation.)

At about the same time (between 1486 and 1489) Filippo Buonaccorsi also retold the story but called the women "consecrated women" and the demons "fauns and satyrs", with some claims of objectivity:

Some write that Filimer, king of the Goths, to purify his army, excluded from his camp some consecrated Scythian women (the Scythians call them "alinurnas") who were above normal in beauty and ability, and that these women, wandering about in Asia beyond Maeotis, were raped by fauns and satyrs and gave birth to the Huns. But those who are more familiar with these ancient things recall that this was done not by Filimer, but by Idantirsus. (McMahon's translation.)

== Sources ==
- Damico, Helen (1984). Beowulf's Wealhtheow and the Valkyrie Tradition. University of Wisconsin Press. ISBN 0-299-09500-2.
- Dowden, Ken (2000). European Paganism. The realities of cult from antiquity to the Middle Ages. Routledge, London and New York. ISBN 0-415-12034-9.
- Enright, M.J. (1996). Lady with a Mead Cup. Four Courts Press. ISBN 1-85182-188-0.
- Goffart, Walter (1995). "Two Notes on Germanic Antiquity Today". Traditio. 50: 9–30. doi:10.1017/S0362152900013143. JSTOR 27831908. S2CID 160935384.
- Grimm, Jacob (2014). Teutonic Mythology. Vol. 1. Translated by James Steven, Stallybrass (4 ed.). Forgotten Books.
- Hultgård, Anders (2005). "Seherinnen". In Beck, Heinrich; Geuenich, Dieter; Steuer, Heiko (eds.). Reallexikon der Germanischen Altertumskunde. Vol. 28 (2010 ed.). De Gruyter. doi:10.1515/gao. ISBN 978-3-11-045562-5.
- Klaeber, Friedrich (2008). Fulk, R.D.; Bjork, Robert E.; Niles, John D. (eds.). Klaeber's Beowulf and The Fight at Finnsburg. University of Toronto Press. ISBN 978-0-8020-9843-6.
- Koch, John T. (2020). Celto-Germanic, Later Prehistory and Post-Proto-Indo-European vocabulary in the North and West (PDF). Aberystwyth Canolfan Uwchefrydiau Cymreig a Cheltaidd Prifysgol Cymru, University of Wales Centre for Advanced Welsh and Celtic Studies. ISBN 9781907029325. Archived from the original (PDF) on 2021-11-25.
- Lehmann, Winfred P. (1986). A Gothic Etymological Dictionary. Brill, Leiden. ISBN 9004081763.
- MacLeod, Mindy; Mees, Bernard (2006). Runic Amulets and Magic Objects. The Boydell Press, Woodbridge. ISBN 1-84383-205-4.
- McMahon, James W. (1994). "Valkyries, Midwives, Weavers, and Shape-Changers: Atli's Mother the Snake". Scandinavian Studies. 66 (4): 475―487. JSTOR 40919694.
- Mierow, C. C. (1915). The Gothic History of Jordanes. Princeton University Press, Princeton.
- Morris, Katherine (1991). Sorceress Or Witch?: The Image of Gender in Medieval Iceland and Northern Europe. University Press of America. ISBN 9780819182579.
- Neidorf, Leonard (2014). The Origins of Beowulf: Studies in Textual Criticism and Literary History. Doctoral dissertation, Harvard University.
- Orel, Vladimir E. (2003). A Handbook of Germanic Etymology. Brill. ISBN 978-90-04-12875-0.
- Pohl, Walter (2002). "Ethnicity, Theory, and Tradition: A Response". In Gillett, Andrew (ed.). On Barbarian Identity, Critical Approaches to Ethnicity in the Early Middle Ages. BREPOLS. p. 221―240. ISBN 2503511686.
- Pohl, Walter (2006). "Gender and ethnicity in the early middle ages". In Noble, Thomas F. X. (ed.). From Roman Provinces to Medieval Kingdoms. Psychology Press. p. 139―156. ISBN 978-0-415-32742-8.
- Reichert, Hermann (1995). "Frau". In Beck, Heinrich; Geuenich, Dieter; Steuer, Heiko (eds.). Reallexikon der Germanischen Altertumskunde. Vol. 9 (2010 ed.). De Gruyter. doi:10.1515/gao. ISBN 978-3-11-045562-5.
- Samplonius, Kees (2013) [1995]. "From Veleda to the Völva". In Mulder-Bakker, Anneke (ed.). Sanctity and Motherhood: Essays on Holy Mothers in the Middle Ages. Routledge. ISBN 978-1-134-81949-2.
- Søby Christensen, Arne (2002). Cassiodorus, Jordanes and the History of the Goths. Museum Tusculanun Press. ISBN 87-72-89-7104.
- de Vries, Jan (1970). Altgermanische Religionsgeschichte. Vol. I. Berlin: de Gruyter. doi:10.1515/9783110865486. ISBN 978-3-11-002678-8.
- Wagner, Norbert (1999). Beck, Heinrich (ed.). Germanenprobleme in heutiger Sicht. Reallexikon der Germanischen Altertumskunde - Ergänzungsbände. Vol. 1. De Gruyter. ISBN 9783110108064.
- Wolfram, Herwig (2004). "Origo gentis: The Literature of German Origins". In Murdoch, Brian; Read, Malcolm; Fritz (eds.). Early Germanic Literature and Culture. Camden House. pp. 39–54. ISBN 157113199X.
- Wolfram, Herwig (2006). "Gothic history as historical ethnography". In Noble, Thomas F. X. (ed.). From Roman Provinces to Medieval Kingdoms. Psychology Press. p. 57―74. ISBN 978-0-415-32742-8.
