= Albruna =

Germanic seeress of antiquity

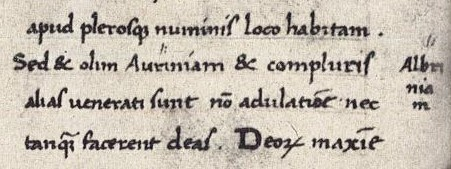
The attestation in the Aesinas codex, considered closest to that of the lost medieval Hersfeld manuscript.

Albruna, Aurinia or Albrinia are some of the forms of the name of a probable Germanic seeress who would have lived in the late 1st century BC or in the early 1st century AD. She was mentioned by Tacitus in Germania, after the seeress Veleda, and he implied that the two were venerated because of true divine inspiration by the Germanic peoples, in contrast to Roman women who were fabricated into goddesses. It has also been suggested that she was the frightening giant woman who addressed the Roman general Drusus in his own language and made him turn back at the Elbe, only to die shortly after, but this may also be an invention to explain why a consul of Rome would have turned back. In addition, there is so little evidence for her that not every scholar agrees that she was a seeress, or that she should be included in a discussion on them. She may also have been a minor goddess, a matron.

Her name has been discussed since the 19th century based on various different forms in the manuscripts where her name appears, and several theories have been put forward, of which Albruna used to be the most accepted one. The emendation Albruna has been explained with definitions such as 'having secret knowledge of elvish spirits', 'confidante of elves' and the 'one gifted with the divine, magical powers of the elves'. However, in 2002, the interpretation Albruna was seriously questioned by a Swedish scholar, who called it a "phantom name" (spöknamn), and since then more scholars have begun to doubt that the form was correct, and may be more in favour of the forms Aurinia and Albrinia. Other suggestions are that it has been derived from a Germanic word *auraz meaning 'water', 'sand' and 'luster', or that it may be a hybrid word containing the Latin word aureum for gold, but they have not become generally accepted. Moreover, it is pointed out that the emendation Albruna is noteworthy in its possible meanings, and that it is similar to the name of another early Germanic priestess.

== Attestation ==
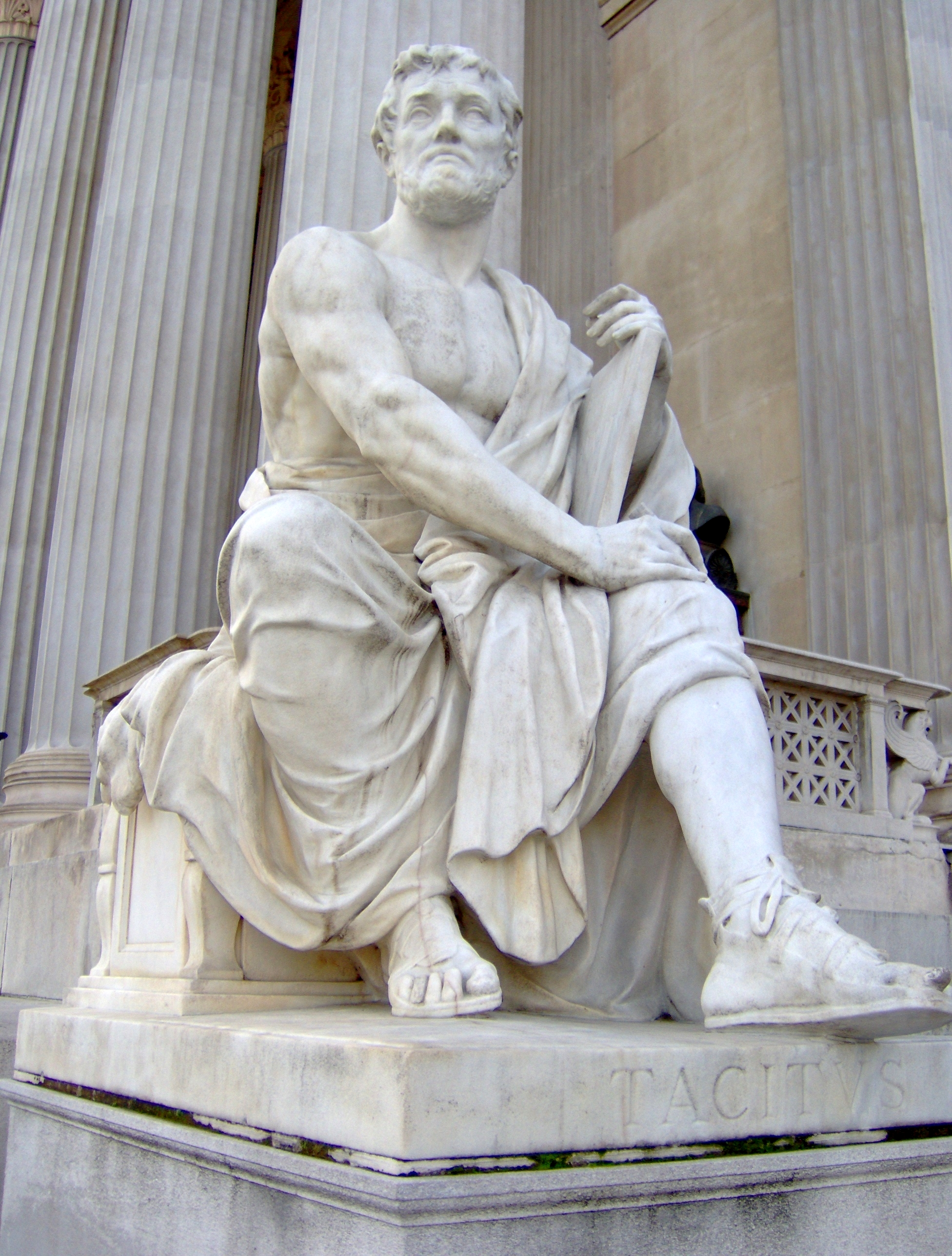
Statue of Tacitus, in Vienna

Her name appears in Tacitus' Germania. In spite of the extensive treatment of the Germanic peoples in the work, only four are mentioned by name, and she is one of them beside the seeress Veleda and the kings Maroboduus and Tudrus. The context is a part of his work where he mentions the position of sanctity that women held among the Germanic tribes.

sed et olim Albrunam et compluris alias venerati sunt, non adulatione nec tamquam facerent deas.

but in ancient times also they reverenced Albruna and many other women — in no spirit of flattery, nor for the manufacture of goddesses. (Hutton's and Peterson's translation).

and in former times, too, they revered Albruna and a number of other women, not through servile flattery nor as if they had to make goddesses out of them. (Birley's translation).

The reference to "making goddesses out of women" is considered to serve to contrast the Germanic reverence of their seeresses with the Roman custom of deifying female members of the imperial family, such as Drusilla, and Poppaea. It is a sarcastic comment on Roman customs, because according to Tacitus, the Germanics identified divine inspiration when they saw it, while the Romans made it up.

Simek comments that it is not clear from the text whether she was a seeress, like Veleda, but she may have been a matron. Orchard agrees that although she was likely a seeress, it is possible that she was one of the matrons, who are like Albruna "now little more than names" and attested in more than 500 inscriptions.

=== Drusus ===
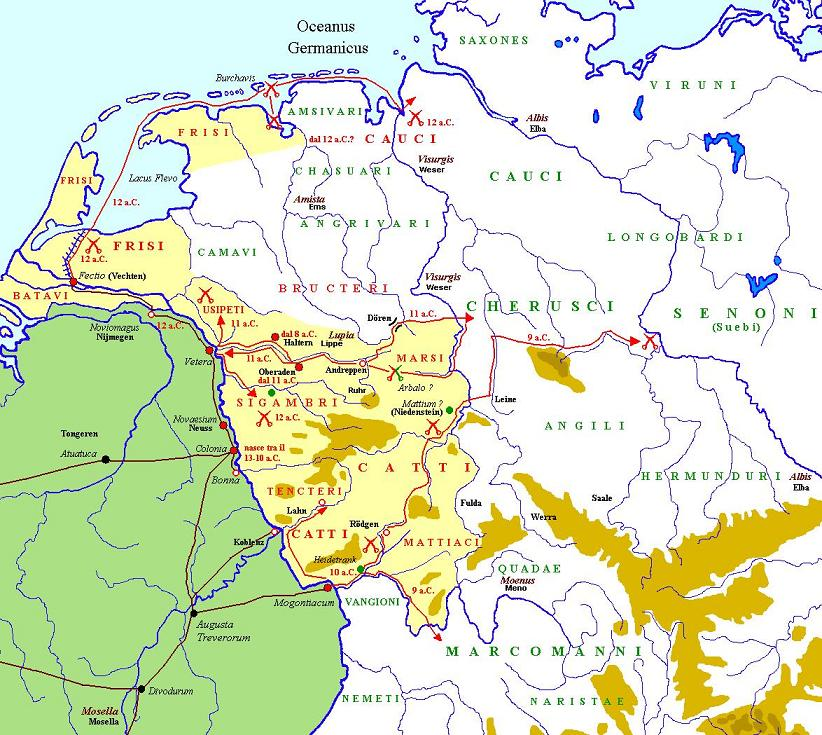
Map of Drusus' campaigns against the Germanic tribes, 12–9 BC

Since there is no mention of the time when she would have lived, some scholars locate her in the time of Germanicus' campaign (AD 11–16), while others set her in the time of Drusus and Tiberius.

Much (1967) and Kienast identify her with the tall but unnamed Germanic seeress who addressed Drusus in his own language and frightened him so much with her prophecies that he did not dare cross the Elbe with his troops in 9 BC and returned after which he died. The account was mentioned by both Cassius Dio and Suetonius.

Drusus was a consul and the stepson of emperor Augustus, and he was conducting a military campaign in the territories of the Suebes. He was stopped by a barbarian woman (barbara mulier) of superhuman size who warned him that he should not continue further with his army. However, he did not heed the warning but resumed the march until he reached the Elbe. He gave up crossing it, but erected a monument in his own honour. On his return from the Elbe he was injured and died in the summer camp before he could return to Rome.

Cassius Dio (book LV):

From there he proceeded to the country of the Cherusci, and crossing the Visurgis, advanced as far as the Albis, pillaging everything on his way. The Albis rises in the Vandalic Mountains, and empties, a mighty river, into the northern ocean. Drusus undertook to cross this river, but failing in the attempt, set up trophies and withdrew. For a woman of superhuman size met him and said : "Whither, pray, art thou hastening, insatiable Drusus ? It is not fated that thou shalt look upon all these lands. But depart; for the end alike of thy labours and of thy life is already at hand." It is indeed marvellous that such a voice should have come to any man from the Deity, yet I cannot discredit the tale; for Drusus immediately departed, and as he was returning in haste, died on the way of some disease before reaching the Rhine. (Cary's translation).

Suetonius:

He also killed many of the enemy and forced them far back into the most remote places of the interior, not leaving off his pursuit until an apparition, in the form of a barbarian woman but of greater than human size, gave a warning, in the Latin language, that the victor should not press further on. (Edward's translation).

She may indeed have lived in the Elbe region at the time of Drusus, and may very well have been the one Drusus encountered. However, as commented by Okamura, the encounter with Drusus may have been a creation by the Roman public opinion c. 9 B.C. to explain why their army could have turned back. Since they would have had some familiarity with the northern Germanic seeresses, they could have imagined that only the supernatural powers of these sorceresses could have thwarted the advance of the Roman legions. It is also possible that the encounter may have been fabricated by Drusus' friends to give an honorable explanation as to why he retreated and soon mysteriously died, and so the account may give an insight into the public Roman imagination, and not about the seeresses of the Germanic tribes.

== Name debate ==
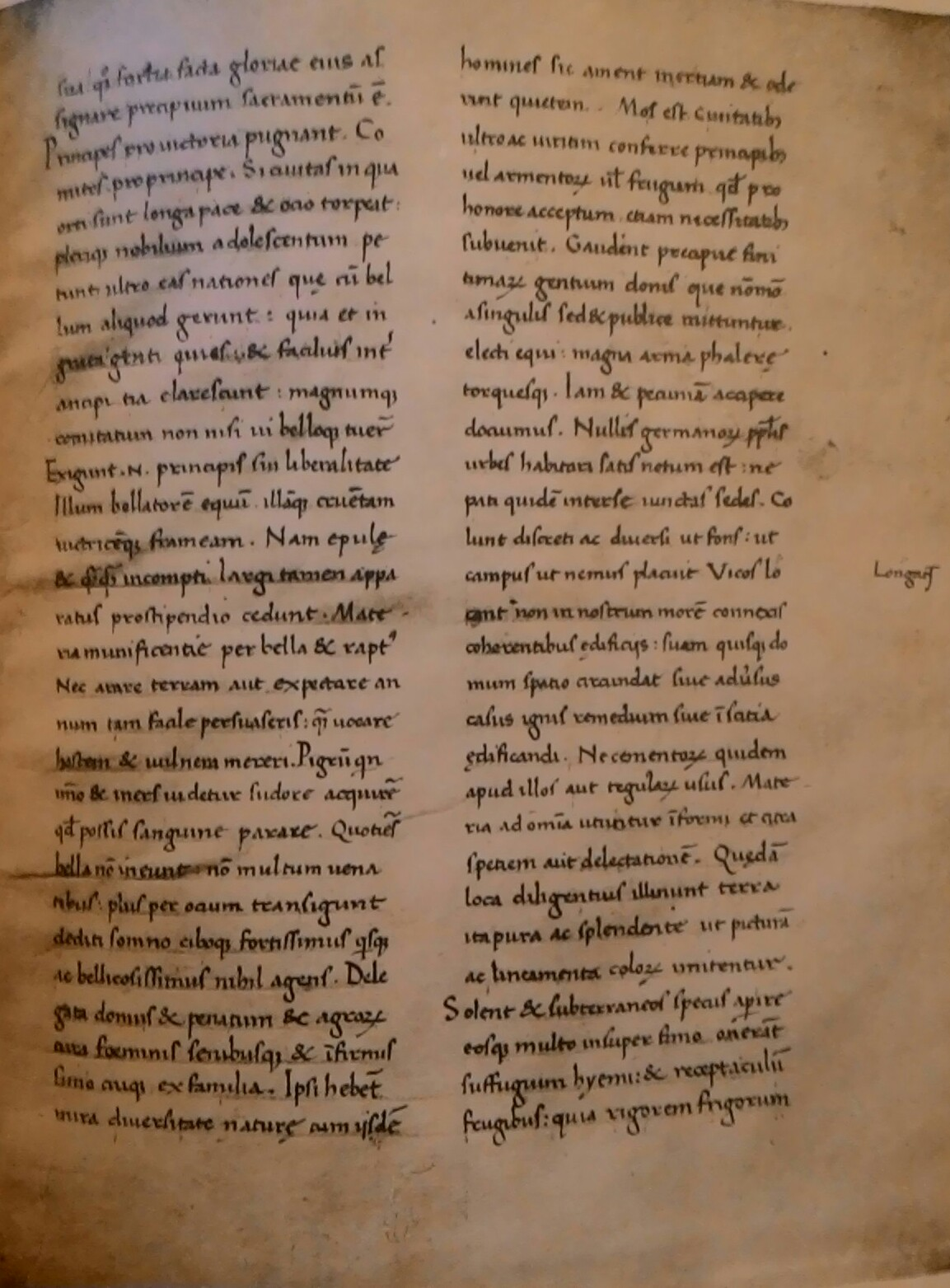
The Codex Aesinas, the only direct copy of the Hersfeld manuscript.

The emendation of her name is not certain, but is inferred from Aurinia or Albrinia in the mss (manuscripts), or rather the various attestations in them, i.e. auriniam, aurimam, aurinam, auarimam, auriniam, albrinam, albrimam, fluriniam, albriniam and albrimam. Lukman (1949) claimed that Cassiodorus may have been influenced by the form aurinia and used it when writing his account on the Haliurunas in the Getica, but the word haliurunna is generally considered to be an authentic Gothic word.

=== Albruna ===
It was Wackernagel who first proposed the emendation Albrunam, and Albruna, and which was accepted by Müllenhoff, and de Vries. It has since then been the most commonly accepted form. The name is also attested independently for other women as Albrun in OHG, Ælfrun in OE and Alfrun in ON. Several scholars, such as Much and Kienast (1959) and Bruder (1974) consider it to have been a byname rather than a proper name, like Veleda.

The form Alb- is from Proto-Germanic *albaz and it is of uncertain origin. It may be related to Sanskrit ṛbhú- 'clever, skillful' or be derived from Proto-Indo-European *albh- 'white'. The elves were supernatural human sized beings with generally positive connotations. In Scandinavian sources, there is evidence for sacrifices to the elves in Austrfararvísur, where Sighvatr Þórðarson was refused lodging in western Sweden because people were sacrificing, and also in Kormáks saga. The legendary king Óláfr Geirstaðaálfr may have been called "elf" because he was "extremely beautiful and large man" and the sagas tell of the beauty and elvish blood of the people of Álfheim and their descendants. In West Germanic names, it became common to use ælf- and alb- after Christianization. In Francia they appeared in the late 5th century (as in Albofledis, the daughter of king Childeric I), among the Lombards they appear in the 6th century with Alboin and his daughter Albsuinda, and in England they seem to have appeared after 600. These elf-names appeared the same time as names having the Greek element aggelos 'angel', and so elf appears to have been considered a Germanic equivalent for 'potentially benign supernatural beings'. The possible appearance of Albruna in Tacitus' work 98 AD, suggests, however, that these names may have reflected much older naming traditions.

The name element -run is a rare element in Old Germanic names. Sixth century Goth scholar Jordanes reported in his Getica that the early Goths had called their seeresses haliuru(n)nae and the word also identified in Old English, hellerune ('seeress' or 'witch') and in OHG as hellirûna ('necromancy') and hellirunari ('necromancer'), and from these forms an earlier Proto-Germanic form *χalja-rūnō(n) has been reconstructed, in which the first element is *χaljō, i.e. Hel, the abode of the dead, and the second is *rūnō ('mystery, secret'). In the Proto-Germanic period, before the introduction of runes, the word *rūnō did not yet refer to letters (rune) but it appears to have referred to chanting, and with this meaning it was probably borrowed from Proto-Germanic into Finnish where runo means 'poem'. In the daughter languages, it had various meanings in addition to runic writing. In Gothic it had the meanings 'secret' and 'decision', in Old High German it meant 'secret' and 'whisper', in Old English it referred to 'secret' and 'secret advice', and in Old Norse it meant 'secret knowledge'.

Rudolf Much translated the name as 'having secret knowledge of elvish spirits' or 'confidante of elves'. Schweizer-Sidler and Schwyzer follow Wackernagel and explain her name as 'one gifted with the divine, magical powers (runa) of the [elves]', and Simek interprets Albruna as 'the trusted friend of the elves' or 'the one gifted with the secret knowledge of the elves'. Although, Orchard cautions that most manuscripts have the name Aurinia, he considers Albruna to be "highly appropriate" and he agrees on the translation 'elf-confidante'. Morris translates her name as 'a sorceress with elf-like power' and compares it to Old English liodruna which meant 'sorceress with the help of songs' and helliruna 'a sorceress with the power of hell'.

Simek considers Albrinia and Aurinia to be the more likely forms but comments that the etymological interpretations of Albruna are very tempting. If the name is correct, she would indeed have been a seeress.

=== Aurinia ===
Schramm writes that in 2002, the Albruna interpretation fell apart like a "house of cards", when Lena Peterson did research on the Hersfeld manuscript, which during the Middle Ages was the only extant copy. She identified Aurinia as the only possible interpretation, and called Albruna a spöknamn 'phantom name'. Schramm argues that Aurinia was confused by an Italian copyist with the name of the town Albinia, which resulted in the form Albrinia, on which the Albruna reading is based. If Albruna was the original name it would still have had the Proto-Germanic form *Albiruna [sic.], in the 1st century, and it is unlikely that the second vowel would not have been attested in the name, but in the 19th century scholars still interpreted Arminius as Hermann.

Already Schönfeld (1910) reacted against the emendation Albruna and suggested that Aurinia may have been a Celtic name that was borrowed by the Germanic peoples. However, Schramm rejects this because Celtic names with the suffix -ia were assimilated by Proto-Germanic as the suffix -jō-, which was limited to bisyllabic names with stems with short syllables, which would have produced *Aurinī. Schramm suggests that the original form was instead a Germanic-based *Aurinī, where the first element is aur- from Proto-Germanic *auraz meaning 'water', 'sand' and 'luster', and that the second element is a Germanic feminine suffix -inī. The present form of the second element is due to a Latinization, in the same way as *Amisī (the Ems) was Latinized as Amisia. Hultgård agrees that Aurinia can be analyzed as a Germanic name, and he considers Albruna not to be convincing. He adds that there is so little evidence for her that she should not be included in discussions on Germanic seeresses.

Schuhmann considers that Veleda was a Celtic name and that Celtic names may have the suffixes -inios and -inia, as in the names Adnamatinia, Blandinia and Eluinia. He also comments that there are Celtic names beginning with au- as Aurus and Auritus, but the root would not have been Celtic but Latin. Consequently, he considers Aurinia not to be a Germanic name, but a hybrid name based on Latin aureum 'gold'. However, Nedoma rejects both Schumann's and Schramm's proposals as unconvincing.

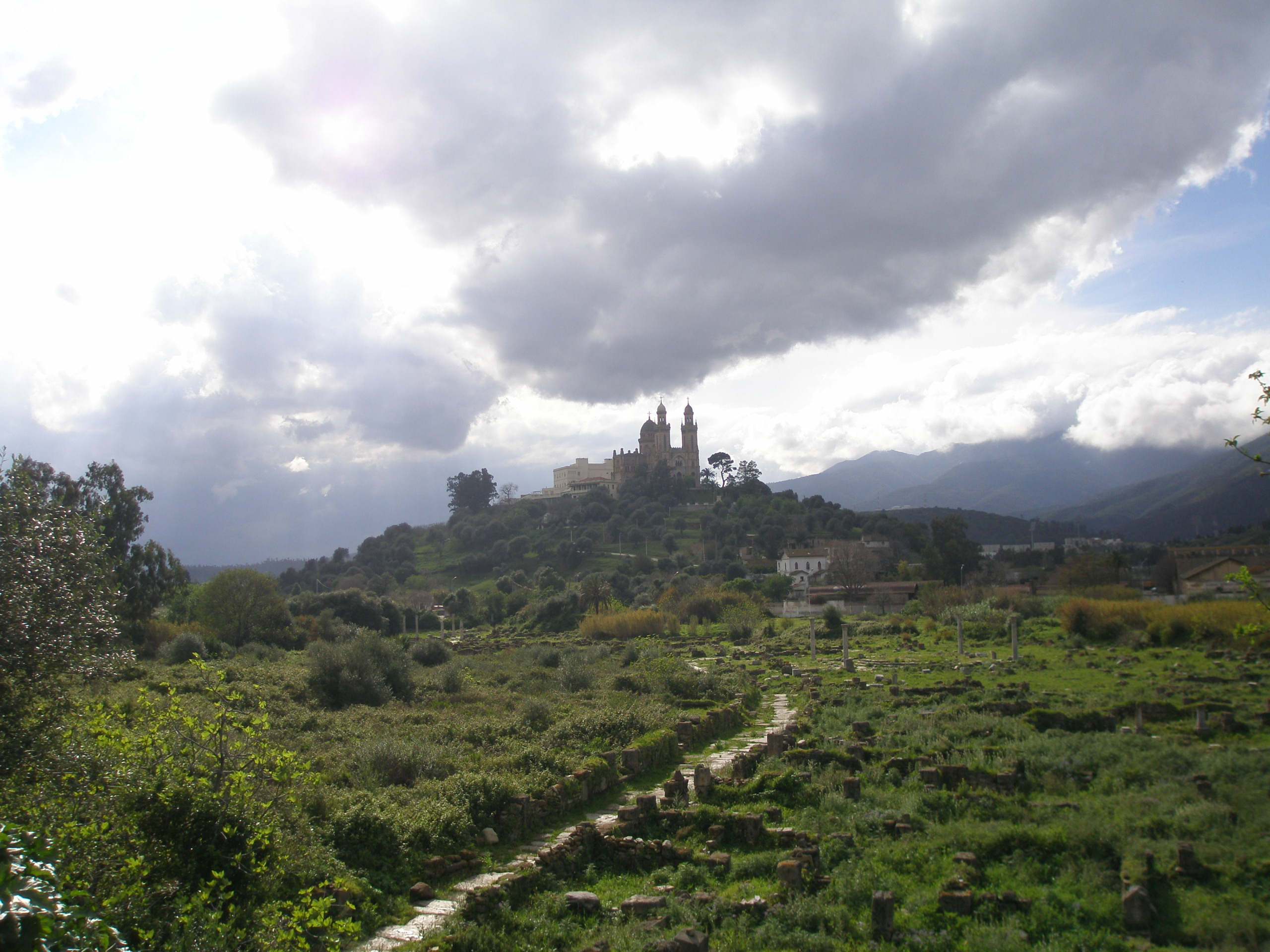
Hippo Regius

Reichert has studied the name Guiliaruna, which appears as the name of a female Christian priest among the Germanic Vandals in Hippo Regius in North Africa, and he argues that Albruna can not be dismissed. He comments that it can hardly be a coincidence that a priestess is attested with a name having the second element -runa, from Proto-Germanic *rūnō, and it is probably not the name she was given at birth, but an epithet meaning 'priestess'. The first letters Gu- is a common representation of Germanic w-. There appears to be three early Germanic professional epithets for seeresses that have come down to us. Veleda had an epithet that was probably Germanic, as evidenced by the long ae, and related to a Celtic word, the second is Waluburg 'magic staff' and the third is probably Albruna. Guiliaruna can not have received a name meaning 'seeress' from Christian traditions, and so it must be based on Germanic lore, and there are other examples of elements from Germanic paganism that have influenced Christian terminology. He concludes that Lena Peterson may be right in calling Albruna a "ghost name", but the existence of Guiliaruna makes it less so.

== Sources ==
- Cassius Dio, L. (1917). Dio's Roman History. Vol. VI. Translated by Cary, E. Oxford University Press.
- Cornelius Tacitus, P. (1999). Agricola and Germany. Translated by Birley, A.R. Oxford University Press. ISBN 0-19-283300-6.
- Cornelius Tacitus, P. (2007). Germania. Translated by Fuhrmann, Manfred. Philipp Reclam jun. Stuttgart. ISBN 978-3-15-009391-7.
- Cornelius Tacitus, P. (1914). Ogilvie, R.M.; Warmington, E.H.; Winterbottom, Michael (eds.). Agricola. Germania. Dialogue on Oratory. Loeb Classical Library 35. Vol. 1. Translated by Hutton, M.; Peterson, W. Harvard University Press. ISBN 978-0-674-99039-5.
- Dowden, Ken (2000). European Paganism. The realities of cult from antiquity to the Middle Ages. Routledge, London and New York. ISBN 0-415-12034-9.
- Förstemann, Ernst (1900). Altdeutsches Namenbuch, Band 1: Personennamen (2 ed.). Bonn.
- Hultgård, Anders (2005). "Seherinnen". In Beck, Heinrich; Geuenich, Dieter; Steuer, Heiko (eds.). Reallexikon der Germanischen Altertumskunde. Vol. 28 (2010 ed.). De Gruyter. doi:10.1515/gao. ISBN 978-3-11-045562-5.
- Koch, John T. (2020). Celto-Germanic, Later Prehistory and Post-Proto-Indo-European vocabulary in the North and West (PDF). Aberystwyth Canolfan Uwchefrydiau Cymreig a Cheltaidd Prifysgol Cymru, University of Wales Centre for Advanced Welsh and Celtic Studies. ISBN 978-1-907029-32-5. Archived from the original (PDF) on 25 November 2021.
- Morris, Katherine (1991). Sorceress Or Witch?: The Image of Gender in Medieval Iceland and Northern Europe. University Press of America. ISBN 978-0-8191-8257-9.
- Nedoma, Roberg (2004). Personennamen in südgermanischen Runeninschriften. Studien zur altgermanischen Namenkunde I,1,1. Universitätsverlag Winter, Heidelberg. ISBN 3-8253-1646-7.
- Okamura, Lawrence (1995). "Germanic seeresses through Roman eyes". Classica - Revista Brasileira de Estudos Clássicos. 7: 285–299. doi:10.24277/classica.v7i0.678. S2CID 165200223.
- Orchard, Andy (1997). Dictionary of Norse Myth and Legend. Cassel, London. ISBN 0-304-34520-2.
- Orel, Vladimir E. (2003). A Handbook of Germanic Etymology. Brill. ISBN 978-90-04-12875-0.
- Reichert, Hermann (2009). "Sprache und Namen der Wandalen in Afrika". In Beck, Heinrich; Geuenich, Dieter; Steuer, Heiko (eds.). Namen des Frühmittelalters als sprachliche Zeugnisse und als Geschichtsquellen. Ergänzungsbände zum Reallexikon der Germanischen Altertumskunde. Vol. 66. Walter de Gruyter. pp. 43―120. ISBN 978-3-11-020815-3.
- Schramm, Gottfried (2004). "Die germanische Seherin Aurinia bei Tacitus". In Beck, Heinrich; Geuenich, Dieter; Steuer, Heiko (eds.). Namenwelten, Orts- und Personennamen in historischer Sicht. Ergänzungsbände zum Reallexikon der Germanischen Altertumskunde. Vol. 44. Walter de Gruyter. pp. 577―582. ISBN 3-11-018108-8.
- Schuhmann, R. (2006). Geographischer Raum und Lebensform der Germanen : Kommentar zu Tacitus' Germania, c. 1–20 (PDF) (Thesis). Jena.
- Simek, Rudolf (1996). Dictionary of Northern Mythology. Translated by Angela Hall. Boydell & Brewer Ltd. ISBN 978-0-85991-513-7.
- Simek, Rudolf (2017). "On Elves". In Brink, Stefan; Collinson, Lisa (eds.). Theorizing Old Norse Myths. Brepols. pp. 195–224. ISBN 978-2-503-55303-0.
- Simek, Rudolf (2020). "Encounters: Roman". In Schjødt, J.P; Lindow, J.; Andrén, A. (eds.). The Pre-Christian Religions of the North, History and Structures. Vol. I. Brepols. pp. 269–288. ISBN 978-2-503-57491-2.
- Søby Christensen, Arne (2002). Cassiodorus, Jordanes and the History of the Goths. Museum Tusculanun Press. ISBN 87-7289-710-4.
- Suetonius Tranquillus, G. (2000). Lives of the Caesars. Translated by Edwards, C. Oxford University Press. ISBN 978-0-19-953756-3.
- de Vries, Jan (1970). Altgermanische Religionsgeschichte. Vol. I. Berlin: de Gruyter. doi:10.1515/9783110865486. ISBN 978-3-11-002678-8.
