= Masyas =

King of the Semnones

Masyas, Masyus or Masyos (Greek: Μάσυος) was a King of the Semnones (Greek: Σεμνόνων βασιλεύς) in the 1st century. The Semnones were a Germanic tribe, part of the Suebi. Cassius Dio writes that he at one point visited Roman emperor Domitian along with the priestess Ganna.

== Sources ==
- Felix Dahn: Masyos. In: Allgemeine Deutsche Biographie (ADB). Band 20, Duncker & Humblot, Leipzig 1884, S. 581.
