= Gambara (seeress) =

Germanic mythical figure

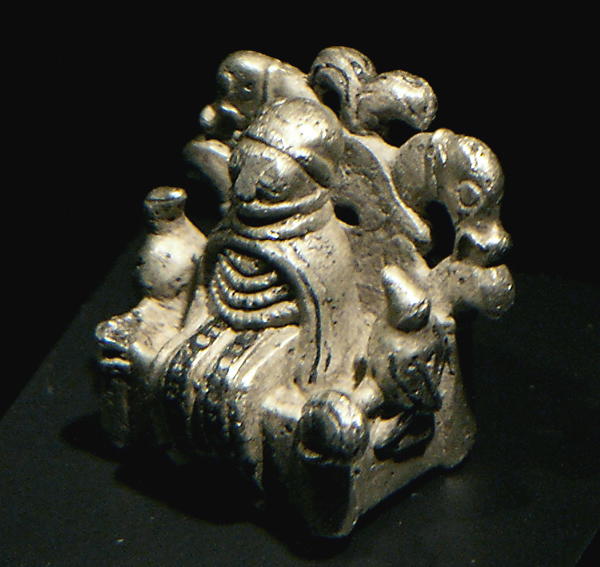
"Odin from Lejre" (approx 900 AD): silver figurine depicting a deity identified as Odin, accompanied by his two ravens Huginn and Munin and seated on his throne Hliðskjálf (at his window), from which he is able to look down upon all Midgard.

Gambara is a Germanic wise woman (also called priestess or seeress) who appears in several sources from the 8th to 12th centuries. The legend is about the origin of the Langobard people, then known as the Winnili, and it takes place either before they emigrated from Scandinavia or after their migration, having settled in modern-day northern Germany. It relates that Assi and Ambri, the leaders of their neighbours the Vandals, demanded that Ibor and Agio, the leaders of the Winnili, pay tribute to them, but their mother Gambara advised them not to. Before the battle, the Vandals called on Odin (Godan) to give them victory, but Gambara invoked Odin's wife Frea (Frigg and/or Freyja) instead. Frea advised them to trick her husband, by having the Winnili women spread their hair in front of their faces so as to look bearded and present themselves as warriors. When Odin saw them, he was embarrassed and asked who the "long-beards" (longobarbae) were, and thus naming them he became their godfather and had to grant them victory. The legend has parallels in Norse mythology, where Frigg also deceives her husband in earthly politics.

== Etymology ==
Some connect her name to Old High German: gambar ('strenuous'), while others interpret it as *gand-bera or *gand-bara with the same meaning as Old Norse: vǫlva 'wand bearer', i.e. 'seeress'. Her name is thus grouped with other seeresses who have staff names, or names that can be interpreted as such, like Ganna ('wand-bearer') and Waluburg from walu- 'staff' (Old Norse: vǫlr).

The name of her son Agio is from PGmc *aʒjō ('sword', 'edge'), while his brother Ibor's name means 'boar' (from PGmc *eƀuraz) the animal sacred to the Norse god Freyr, the god of fertility and the main god of the Vanir clan of the gods, whom it has been argued were the primary gods of the early Lombards in Scandinavia, and Gambara would have been the priestess and earthly representative of the Vanir goddess Frea (Freyja).

The name of the Vandal enemy leader, on the other hand, Assi, is a very rare Germanic personal name that is probably derived from PGmc *ansiz ~ *ansuz, which refers to Odin's own Æsir clan of gods, and who according to Scandinavian sources waged war against the Vanir until they reached a peace agreement, united and exchanged hostages. His brother's name Ambri is probably derived from the ethnonym Ambrones, a tribe who left southern Scandinavia and were virtually annihilated by the Romans in 102 BC, apparently driven from their homes by soil exhaustion in Jutland.

In Lombard, Odin and Frigg were called Godan and Frea, while they were called Uodan and Friia in Old High German and Woden and Frig in Old English, but the Lombard form Frea would have been more correctly spelled as Fria. However, according to differences in scholarly opinion, Frea is can also be identified as Frigg/Freyja, or simply as Freyja, but the names are different in origin. Frigg is derived from PGmc *frijjō and identical with Sanskrit priyā́ ('own, dear, beloved') through their common Proto-Indo-European origin, while Freyja is from *frawjōn and means 'lady', and the same word OHG frouwa and OS frūa meaning 'lady' or 'mistress'.

== The Lombard legend ==
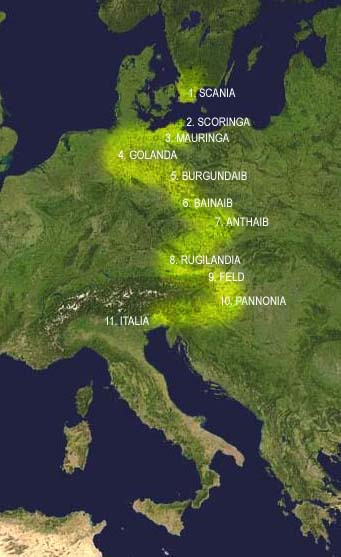
The legend of Gambara takes place when they are either still in Scandinavia or when they had settled in northern Germany, but the tradition was written down when the Lombards were settled in Italy.

Tacitus relates that the Germanic tribes ascribed prophetic powers to women, but the seeresses do not appear to have been just any women, but existing as an office. The very fact that Gambara's name was written out in the legend testifies to her importance, and it is remarkable in being the only genealogy that was written in the post-Roman era to have a woman as the origin. Moreover, in Paul the Deacon's late 8th c. work Historia langobardorum, she is introduced with the words

The mother of these leaders, Gambara by name,' was a woman of the keenest ability and most prudent in counsel among her people, and they trusted not a little to her shrewdness in doubtful matters. (Foulke's translation).

The earliest account of Gambara appears in the 7th century Origo Gentis Langobardorum, where Gambara's two sons join her in invoking the goddess Frea, and here they are still in Scandinavia, while Paul the Deacon's version places the event after they have migrated to Scoringa (modern northern Germany):

Then Ambri and Assi, that is, the leaders of the Vandals, asked Godan that he should give them victory over the Winniles. Godan answered, saying: "Whom I shall first see when at sunrise, to them I will give the victory." At that time, Gambara with her two sons, that is Ybor and Agio, who were chiefs over the Winniles, besought Frea, the wife of Godan, to be propitious to the Winnilis [sic.]. Then Frea gave counsel that at sunrise the Winniles should come, and that their women, with their hair let down, around the face in the likeness of a beard, should also come with their husbands. Then when it became bright, while the sun was rising, Frea, the wife of Godan, turned around the bed where her husband was lying, and put his face toward the east and awakened him. And he, looking at them, saw the Winniles and their women having their hair let down around the face. And he says, "Who are those Long-beards?" And Frea said to Godan "As you have given them a name, give them also the victory." And he gave them the victory, so that they should defend themselves according to his counsel and obtain the victory. (Foulke's translation).

One scholar argues that at the time Paul the Deacon wrote his version of the account, the Lombards had been Christian for generations, and their language, if it ever existed, mostly forgotten, except for some legal and military terms. However, McKinnell notes that all over the Germanic-speaking parts of Europe, Christian scholars were driven by the motive of eradicating pagan superstitions, and Paul the Deacon takes care to caution the mediaeval reader – in more than one place in his account – that the pagan legend involving Gambara is not to be taken seriously. :

At this point, the men of old tell a silly story that the Wandals coming to Godan (Wotan) besought him for victory over the Winnili and that he answered that he would give the victory to those whom he saw first at sunrise; that then Gambara went to Frea (Freja) wife of Godan and asked for victory for the Winnili, and that Frea gave her counsel that the women of the Winnili should take down their hair and arrange it upon the face like a beard, and that in the early morning they should be present with their husbands and in like manner station themselves to be seen by Godan from the quarter in which he had been wont to look through his window toward the east. And so it was done. And when Godan saw them at sunrise he said: "Who are these long-beards?" And then Frea induced him to give the victory to those to whom he had given the name.' And thus Godan gave the victory to the Winnili. These things are worthy of laughter and are to be held of no account. (Foulke's translation).

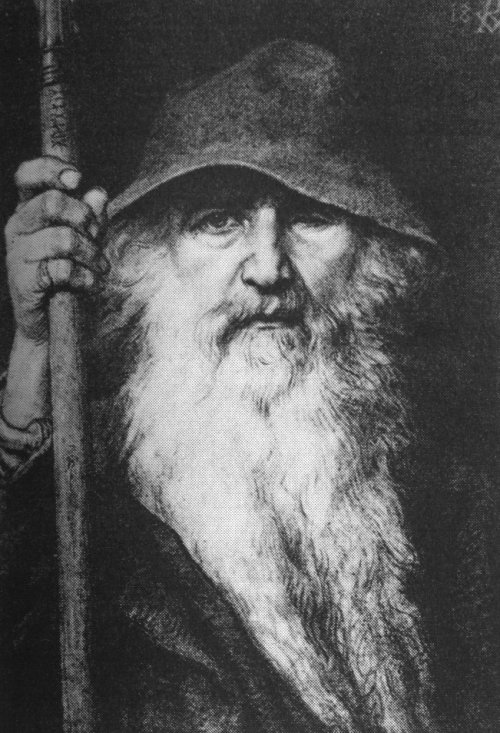
Odin, the god of wisdom and intrigues was no match for his wife, in both Lombard and Scandinavian accounts.

In the Latin original text, Paul the Deacon uses the past infinitive in order to distance the events and remind the reader the information must not be taken seriously. Gambara is also mentioned in the early 9th century Historia Langobardorum codicis Gothani, but without the Godan and Frea account:

Thus did the aforesaid Gambara assert concerning them (not prophesying things which she knew not, but, like the Pythoness or Sibyl, speaking because a divine visitation moved her), that "the thorn should be turned into a rose". (Hodgkin's translation).

Gambara is characterized as phitonissa in Latin which means 'priestess' or 'sorceress', and as sibylla, i.e. 'seeress'. Pohl comments that Gambara lived in a world and era where prophecy was important, and not being a virgin like Veleda, she combined the roles of priestess, wise woman, mother and queen.

The tradition is also reflected in the late 12th c. Gesta Danorum (viii.13.2), where the setting is in Scandinavia before the emigration of the Winnili, and there she is called Gambaruc. She is outraged that the assembly and her sons Aio and Ibor want to avert a famine by killing all the infants and the elderly and banish all the rest who are not able bodied warriors and farmers. Instead they should draw lots, and a part of the population should seek new lands.

When these two men brought the news to their mother, Gambaruk, she saw that the authors of the nefarious decree had grounded their own safety on this crime; condemning the assembly's decision, she denied that it needed the murder of kindred to rescue them from their predicament and declared that it would be a more decent scheme, and desirable for the good of their souls and bodies, if they preserved the duty owed to parents and children and selected by lot those who should leave the land. (Fisher's translation).

It is noteworthy that, just like Paul the Deacon, the author of Gesta Danorum, Saxo Grammaticus, portrayed her the wisest person in the realm.

== Description ==
Hauck describes her as a priestess and an earthly representative of the mother goddess Frea (Freyja), but Schmidt was of an opposing view and argued that nothing is known about Germanic priesthood at this time. He identified her and the other seeresses as "wise women", who may only have been relevant when they could say something about the future to representatives of a male priesthood, but he acknowledged that Gambara as a wise woman, like Veleda, could have exerted political influence.

However, others may not see the roles of "priestess" and "wise woman" as mutually exclusive. Pohl writes that Gambara, even though she was not a virgin like Veleda, "combined the roles of the wise woman/priestess, the mother and the princess/queen".

Simek points out that although her name is interpreted as meaning 'seeress' ('staff bearer'), she is not said to perform any prophesying in the legend, but Jarnut comments that in the so-called Historia Langobardorum codicis Gothani, from the early 9th century, she is characterized as a great seeress, like Pythia and the Sibyl.

== Interpretations ==
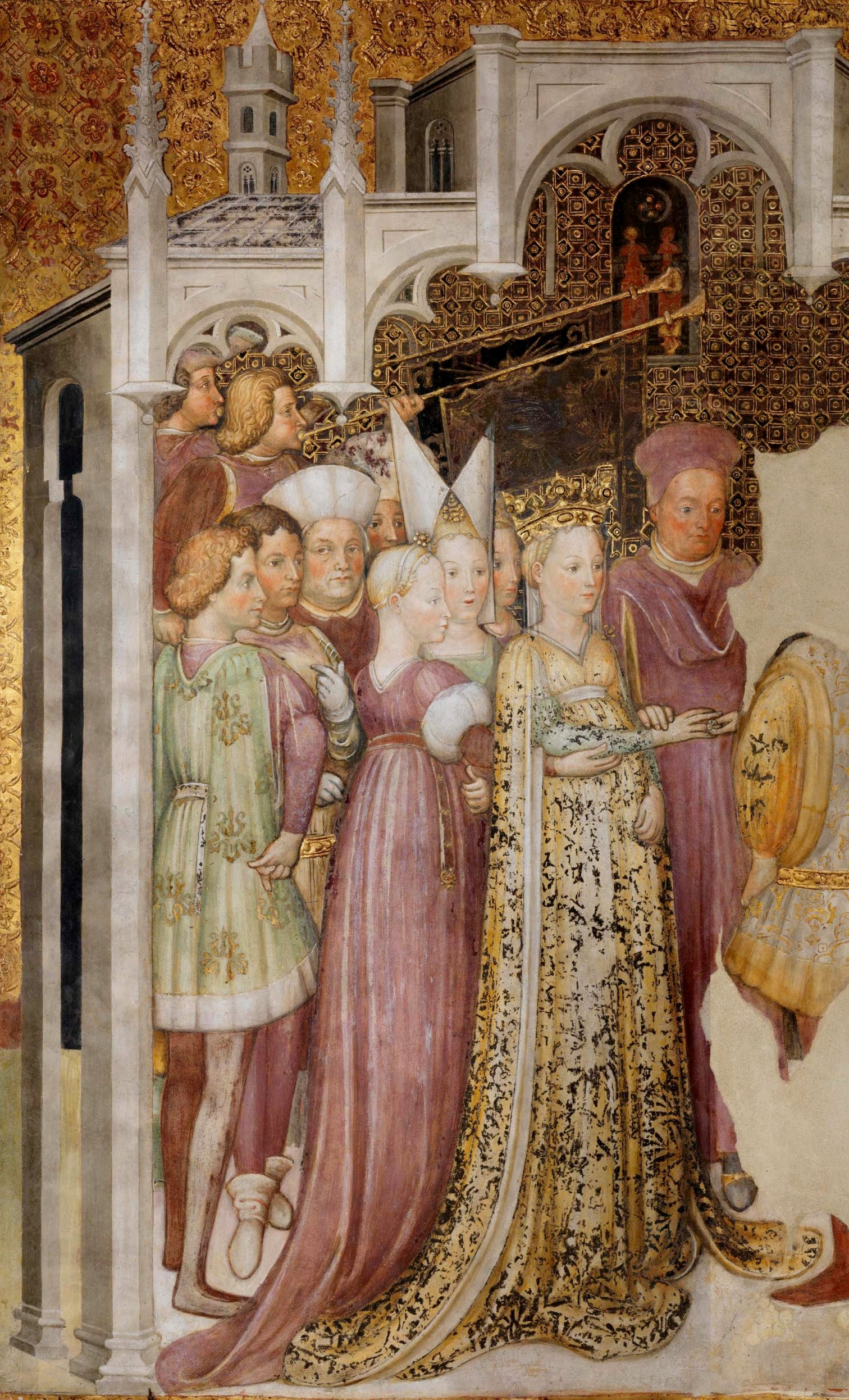
Theodelinda in a fresco by Zavattari. She had her palace decorated with illustrations on Lombard legends, and her daughter may have influenced the legend.

Hauck argues that the legend goes back to a time when the early Lombards primarily worshiped the mother goddess Freyja, as part of the Scandinavian Vanir worship, and he adds that a Lombard counterpart of Uppsala has been discovered in Žuráň, near Brno in the modern day Czech republic.

Wolfram (2006) is of the same opinion and writes that the saga begins in a Vanir context, where two brothers are directed by a wise and divinely inspired woman. She is a priestess who invokes and receives help from the Vanir goddess Fre(yi)a, when her tribe is threatened by the more numerous Vandals. He comments that Fre(yi)a is portrayed as the wife of Woden (Odin), and this role normally belongs to the Aesir goddess Frigg, but he considers correct the view that she and several other goddess are versions of Freyja. Both the Vinnili and the Vandals were ready to transform themselves into more successful model of a migrating army, and consequently to reject their old Vanir (fertility) cult and embrace Odin as their leader. It is the women that sacrifice their past and their traditional cult in order to save their tribe under the leadership of their priestess Gambara and their goddess Freyja. They pave the way for their men's victory and they legitimize the transformation into a new tribe, the Lombards. Wolfram compares this to the legend of the haliurunnae, the Gothic priestesses who after the Goths' migration from Scandinavia represented the conservative faction, but they lost when the majority of the Goths changed cult, and were banished.

In a similar vein, two Italian scholars, Gaspari (1983) and Taviani-Carozzi (1991) have interpreted the legend as a representation of the priestly aspect of Dumézil's trifunctional hypothesis.

Pohl (2002) points out that in the beginning they are called the Vinnili and are led by Gambara, a woman, but in the end, they are called the Longobards and are ruled by two men, her sons, and it may be discussed whether this represents a shift from matrilinearity to patrilinearity, or if it is a mediaeval perception of this having happened in the past. There is long tradition among scholars to discuss this legend as such a transition, or as a change from a mother goddess to a god of war, but Pohl (2006) notes that the account was written down 700 years later then the events it describes. He also remarks that the legend is the only genealogy where a Germanic tribe (gens) derives its origins from the actions of a woman, and relying on Frea, she outwits Odin (Wodan), himself. In addition, it reverses the gender roles, because the bearded warriors that Odin sees are in fact women. He suggests that this prominent role of women is due to the Lombard traditions having been transmitted and told by Lombard women. The first history of the Lombards, the lost Historiola from 610, was commissioned by Theodelinda, the granddaughter of Wacho who had led the tribe into Pannonia, and she had her palace in Monza decorated with scenes from the Lombard past. In addition, the Origo is unusual because it mostly enumerates the consorts and the children of the Lombard rulers. Theodelinda and her daughter Gundeperga were not only garantors of royal legitimacy, but they probably played a central role in the Lombard identity politics of the time. They represented the prestige of the ancient royal Lombard lineage, and the Origo explained how, and Pohl suggests that the account may have been shaped in Italy with influence from the recurrent wise women in the literature about the early Germanic tribes.

However, in a more recent work, Pohl (2018) supports the pagan origin of the legend by noting that it is not surprising that Paul the Deacon warns his readers that the story was a "ridiculous fable" as it implies the agency of pagan gods. Likewise, Fredegar condemns openly the people who believe that Odin had given them their name. Consequently, Pohl concludes "[i]t is hardly plausible that this objectionable legend had simply been invented by Christian authors."

== Norse mythology ==
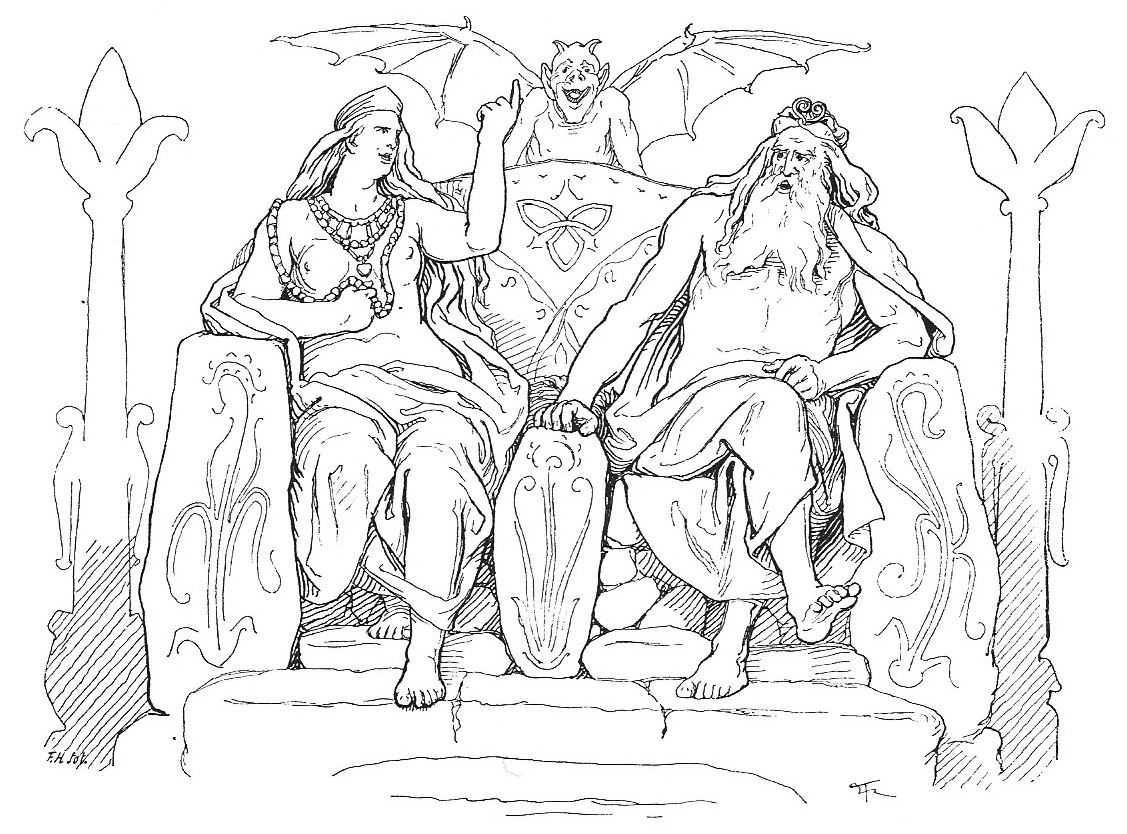
Frigg and Odin wagering against each other upon Hliðskjálf in Grímnismál (1895) by Lorenz Frølich, in a parallel with how she tricked Odin at his window in the Lombard myth.

Although, Paul the Deacon wanted the reader not to take the story seriously, it appears to be an authentic pagan myth about how the fledgling tribe was saved through the cunning of their goddess, who tricked her husband for their sake. Also, in spite of dismissing it, Paul the Deacon did write it down and doing so he preserved a legend that can be compared with several traditions from Scandinavian sources, such as the window from which Odin looked down on earth which recalls the Hliðskjálf of Norse mythology, and from where he could see everything. There are also similarities with Grímnismál where Frigg also conspires against Odin, in a parallel with the Lombard myth, but in this case it is about who will rule over the Goths (stanza 2).

In Grímnismál, Frigg and Odin sit on Hliðskjálf from where they can find information not only about Midgard and Valhalla, but where they also appear to be able to inform themselves about places beyond these realms. They have an argument about their foster-sons Agnarr and Geirrøðr. Odin had conspired and succeeded in making his own ward Geirrøðr replace Frigg's ward Agnarr on the throne, in spite of the fact that Agnar was the elder brother. Geirrøðr rules as the king while Agnarr is exiled to a cave, where he has offspring with a giantess. Frigg points out that Odin has failed in bringing up Geirrøðr because he is so stingy for food that when he has too many guests he starts harassing them. The two make a bet, and Odin sets off to find out about his ward's character in person.

In order to get back at Odin for favouring his own ward, Frigg appears to have consciously deceived her husband about Geirrøð's character. She sends her handmaiden Fulla to Geirrøð and she informs him that an evil sorcerer will visit him in his hall. When Odin appears Geirrøð tortures him and starves him, but eventually Geirrøð's son Agnarr, who is named for his uncle, takes pity on the sorcerer and offers him a horn to drink from. Odin curses Geirrøðr who stumbles and falls on his own sword. When the elder Agnarr had been lost among the chaos forces of the giants, Frigg uses cunning to make Odin prepare the way for the younger Agnarr, who is a substitute for the elder one, and who contrast with his father through his generosity.

The Lombard legend of Gambara and Grímnismál show how Frigg deceives her husband with sorcery and guile, and emphasize her similarities with Freyja, whom even Loki characterized as a sorceress and as false, and who was skilled in magic. These two goddesses trick with illusions anyone who opposes them.

=== Frigg and Freyja ===
Frigg's deceptiveness and connection with prophecy normally belong to Freyja, and her association with magic (seiðr). There is also the similarity that Frigg means 'love', but Freyja was the goddess of Love, and the day Friday ('Venus' day') was translated as Frigg's day and not as Freyja's day. In addition Freyja was married to Óðr (Odin?), who was often gone on long journeys, and in Oddrúnargrátr, stanza 9, the two goddesses are identified as the same. There is sometimes confusion between the two in Norse myths. Consequently, Freyja and Frigg may originally have been the same goddess.

== Sources ==
- Crawford, Jackson W. (2015). The Poetic Edda: Stories of the Norse Gods and Heroes. Indianapolis: Hackett Publishing Company, Inc. ISBN 978-1-62-466356-7.
- Enright, M.J. (1996). Lady with a Mead Cup. Four Courts Press. ISBN 1-85182-188-0.
- Friis-Jensen, Karsten, ed. (2015). Saxo Grammaticus Gesta Danorum, The History of the Danes. Vol. 1. Translated by Fisher, Peter. Oxford University Press. ISBN 978-0-19-82052-34.
- Förstemann, Ernst (1900). Altdeutsches Namenbuch, Band 1: Personennamen (2 ed.). Bonn.
- Peters, Edward, ed. (1974). Paul the Deacon, History of the Lombards. Translated by Foulke, William Dudley. University of Pennsylvania Press, Philadelphia, Pennsylvania. ISBN 0-8122-1079-4.
- Grundy, Stephan (1996). "Freyja and Frigg". In Billington, Sandra; Green, Miranda (eds.). The Concept of the Goddess. Routledge, London and New York. pp. 56–67. ISBN 0-203-76462-5.
- Hauck, K. (1955). "Lebensnormen und Kultmythen in germ. Stammes-und Herrschergenealogien". Saeculum. 6 (JG): 186–223. doi:10.7788/saeculum.1955.6.jg.186. S2CID 170200000.
- Hermann, Pernille (2020). "Memory, Oral Tradition, and Sources". In Schjødt, J.P; Lindow, J.; Andrén, A. (eds.). The Pre-Christian Religions of the North, History and Structures. Vol. I. Brepols. pp. 41–62. ISBN 978-2-503-57491-2.
- Hodgkin, Thomas (1895). Italy and her Invaders. Vol. 1 (2 ed.). Oxford at the Clarendon Press.
- Janson, Henrik (2018). "Pictured by the Other: Classical and Early Medieval Perspectives on Religions in the North". In Clunies Ross, Margaret (ed.). The Pre-Christian Religions of the North, Research and Reception, From the Middle Ages to c. 1830. Vol. I. Brepols. pp. 7–40. ISBN 978-2-503-56881-2.
- Jarnut, Jörg (1998). "Gambara". In Beck, Heinrich; Geuenich, Dieter; Steuer, Heiko (eds.). Reallexikon der Germanischen Altertumskunde. Vol. 10 (2010 ed.). De Gruyter. doi:10.1515/gao. ISBN 978-3-11-045562-5.
- Kovalev, Roman K. (2012). "Grand Princess Olga of Rus' Shows the Bird: Her 'Christian Falcon' Emblem". Russian History. 39 (4): 460–517. doi:10.1163/48763316-03904002.
- Lindow, John (2001). Handbook of Norse Mythology. Handbooks of World Mythology. ABC-CLIO, Inc., Santa Barbara, California; Denver, Colorado; Oxford, England. ISBN 1-57607-217-7.
- Mazo, Jeffrey A. (2016). "Grímnismál". In Pulsiano, Philip; Wolf, Kirsten (eds.). Medieval Scandinavia: An Encyclopedia. Routledge. p. 243. ISBN 978-1-315-16132-7.
- McKinnell, John (2005). Meeting the Other in Norse Myth and Legend. D.S. Brewer, Cambridge. ISBN 1843840421.
- Munch, P.A. (1926). Norse Mythology, Legends of Gods and Heroes. Translated by Hustvedt, Sigurd Bernhard. New York: The American-Scandinavian Foundation.
- Myhre, Bjørn (2008). "The Iron Age". In Helle, Knut (ed.). The Cambridge History of Scandinavia. Vol. I. Cambridge University Press. pp. 60–93. ISBN 978-0521472999.
- Näsström, B.M. (1994). Freyja – the Great Goddess of the North. Lund Studies in History of Religion. Vol. 5. Department of History of Religions, Lund.
- Näsström, B.M. (1996). "Freyja and Frigg – two aspects of the Great Goddess". Shamanism and Northern Ecology. Religion and Society. Vol. 36. De Gruyter. pp. 81–96. doi:10.1515/9783110811674.81. ISBN 978-3-11-014186-3.
- Näsström, B.M. (2009). Nordiska gudinnor : nytolkningar av den förkristna mytologin. Albert Bonniers Förlag. ISBN 978-9100122379.
- Orel, Vladimir E. (2003). A Handbook of Germanic Etymology. Brill. ISBN 978-90-04-12875-0.
- Pohl, Walter (2002). "Ethnicity, Theory, and Tradition: A Response". In Gillett, Andrew (ed.). On Barbarian Identity, Critical Approaches to Ethnicity in the Early Middle Ages. Brepols. pp. 221–240. ISBN 2503511686.
- Pohl, Walter (2006). "Gender and ethnicity in the early middle ages". In Noble, Thomas F. X. (ed.). From Roman Provinces to Medieval Kingdoms. Psychology Press. pp. 139–156. ISBN 978-0-415-32742-8.
- Pohl, Walter (2018). "Narratives of Origin and Migration in Early Medieval Europe: Problems of Interpretation". The Medieval History Journal. 21 (2): 192–221. doi:10.1177/0971945818775460. S2CID 158374863.
- Price, Neil (2019). The Viking Way, Magic and Mind in Late Iron Age Scandinavia (2 ed.). Oxbow Books, Oxford and Philadelphia. ISBN 978-1842172605.
- Samplonius, Kees (2013) [1995]. "From Veleda to the Völva". In Mulder-Bakker, Anneke (ed.). Sanctity and Motherhood: Essays on Holy Mothers in the Middle Ages. Routledge. ISBN 978-1-134-81949-2.
- Schmidt, Ludwig (1969). Die Ostgermanen (2, new print ed.). Verlag C.H.Beck, München.
- Simek, Rudolf (1996). Dictionary of Northern Mythology. Translated by Angela Hall. Boydell & Brewer Ltd. ISBN 978-0859915137.
- Sundqvist, Olof (2020). "Cultic Leaders and Religious Specialists". In Schjødt, J.P.; Lindow, J.; Andrén, A. (eds.). The Pre-Christian Religions of the North, History and Structures. Vol. II. Brepols. pp. 739–780. ISBN 978-2-503-57491-2.
- Wolfram, Herwig (2006). "Gothic history as historical ethnography". In Noble, Thomas F. X. (ed.). From Roman Provinces to Medieval Kingdoms. Psychology Press. pp. 57–74. ISBN 978-0-415-32742-8.
