= Altgermanische Religionsgeschichte =

Book on ancient Germanic religion

Altgermanische Religionsgeschichte (Ancient Germanic Religious History), by Jan de Vries, was a survey of religious history first published in 1935-37 as Altgermanische Religionsgeschichte, Grundriss der germanischen Philologie, 12, 2 vols (Berlin: de Gruyter, 1935–37). A second, substantially revised edition was published with the same series numbering and publisher in 1956–57. A third edition in 1970 was a reprinting of the second.

== Contents ==
The contents of the second edition are as follows:

Volume 1

Ch. 1: Allgemeine Erörterungen (§§1-16)

Ch. 2: Die Quellen der germanischen Religion (§§17-33)

Ch. 3: Geschichte der Forschung (§§34-61)

Ch. 4: Die vorgeschichtlichen Perioden (§§62-117)

- A. Allgemeines (§62)
- B. Die Steinzeit (§§63-71)
- C. Die Bronzezeit (§§72-93)
- D. Die Eisenzeit (§§94-117)
- Die südgermanischen Verhältnisse (§§95-101)
- Die skandinavische Eisenzeit (§§102-117)

Ch. 5: Die Umwelt der heidnischen Germanen (§§118-130)

- A. Die Verhältnisse in der römischen Germania (§§119-124)
- B. Die Völkerwanderungszeit und die Bekehrung zum Christentum (§§125-127)
- C. Die Umwelt der Nordgermanen (§§128-130)

Ch. 6: Die religiösen Grundlagen des Menschenlebens (§§131-152) Ch. 7: Seelen, Geister und Dämonen, Schicksalsmächte (§§152-193)

- A. Einleitende Bemerkungen (§§152-157)
- B. Die Vorstellungen der Seele (§§158-171)
- C. Echte und angebliche Naturgeister (§§172-187)
  - 1. Die Riesen (§§172-179)
  - 2. Die Zwerge, Wichter und Elben (§§180-187)
- D. Dämonen in Tiergestalt (§§188-189)
- E. Schicksalsmächte (§§190-193)

Ch. 8: Macht und Kraft (§§194-239)

Ch. 9: Das Heilige und die Kultformen (§§240-340)

- A. Der Begriff des Heiligen (§§240-244)
- B. Der heilige Ort (§§245-252)
- C. Die Himmelskörper und das Feuer (§§253-256)
- D. Heilige Tiere und Gegenstände (ẞ257-263)
- E. Tempel und Götterbilder
- F. Das heilige Amt (§§274-281)
- G. Die Opferhandlung (§§282-293)
- H. Das Orakel (§§294-300)
- I. Kultlied, Gesang und Tanz (§§301-304)
- K. Die periodischen Kultfeiern (§§305-314)
- L. Die agrarischen Kulte (§§315-326)
- M. Die Kultverbände (§§327-340)

Volume 2

Ch. 10: Die Götter (§§341-569)

- A. Allgemeine Bemerkungen (§§341-346)
- B. Tîwaz—Týr (§§347-360)
- C. Wodan—Odin (§§361-412)
- D. Donar—Thor (§§413-442)
- E. Ullr und Ullinn (§§443-447)
- F. Die Wanen: Njǫrðr und Freyr (§§448-473)
- G. Der Krieg der Asen und der Wanen (§§474-475)
- H. Baldr (§§476-490)
- I. Heimdallr (§§491-495)
- K. Dioskurische Götter (§§496-500)
- L. Loki (§§501-508)
- M. Die übrigen Götter (§§509-521)
- N. Weibliche Gottheiten (§§522-562)
  - 1. Die in Gruppen auftretenden Gottheiten (§§522-530)
  - 2. Frîja—Frigg (§§531-533)
  - 3. Freyja (§§534-536)
  - 4. Die übrigen weiblichen Gottheiten (§§537-562)
    - a. Die Göttinnen der Westgermanen (§§538-552)
    - b. Die Göttinnen der Nordgermanen (§§553-562)
- O. Schlußbemerkungen (§§563-569)

Ch. 11: Vorstellungen über den Kosmos (§§570-598)

- A. Die Schöpfung (§§570-578)
- B. Das Weltbild (§§579-589)
- C. Das Weltende (§§590-598)

Ch. 12: Der Untergang des Heidentums (§§599-625) Register

== Sources ==
- Jan de Vries, Altgermanische Religionsgeschichte (Grundriß der germanischen Philologie, 12), 2 vols., Berlin: De Gruyter, 1955-56 (vol. 1)
