= Nerthus =

Deity in Germanic paganism

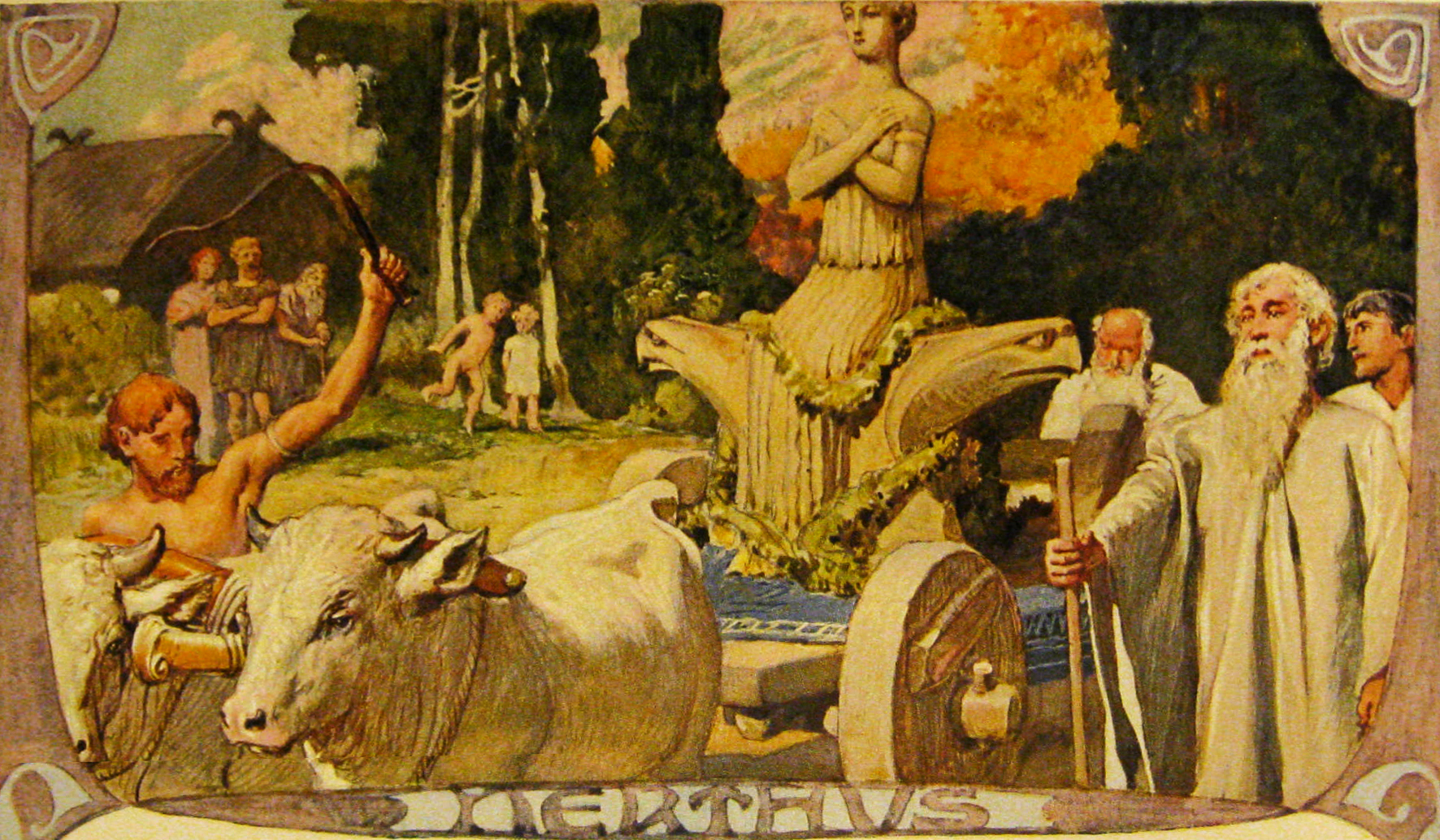
Nerthus is led along her procession in Nerthus, Emil Doepler, 1905

In Germanic paganism, Nerthus, is a goddess associated with a ceremonial wagon procession. Nerthus is attested by first century A.D. Roman historian Tacitus in his ethnographic work Germania.

In Germania, Tacitus records that a group of Germanic peoples were particularly distinguished by their veneration of the goddess. Tacitus describes the wagon procession in some detail: Nerthus's cart is found on an unspecified island in the "ocean", where it is kept in a sacred grove and draped in white cloth. Only a priest may touch it. When the priest detects Nerthus's presence by the cart, the cart is drawn by heifers. Nerthus's cart is met with celebration and peacetime everywhere it goes, and during her procession no one goes to war and all iron objects are locked away. In time, after the goddess has had her fill of human company, the priest returns the cart to her "temple" and slaves ritually wash the goddess, her cart, and the cloth in a "secluded lake". According to Tacitus, the slaves are then immediately drowned in the lake.

Scholars have linked Tacitus's description of ceremonial wagons found from around Tacitus's time up until the Viking Age, particularly the Germanic Iron Age Dejbjerg wagon in Denmark and the Viking Age Oseberg ship burial wagon in Norway. The goddess's name Nerthus (from Proto-Germanic *Nerþuz) is the early Germanic etymological precursor to the Old Norse deity name Njörðr, a male deity who is comparably associated with wagons and water in Norse mythology. Together with his children Freyja and Freyr, the three form part of the Vanir, a family of deities. The Old Norse record contains three narratives featuring ritual wagon processions that scholars have compared to Tacitus's description of Nerthus's wagon procession, one of which (and potentially all of them) focus on Njörðr's son Freyr.

Additionally, scholars have sought to explain the difference in gender between the early Germanic and Old Norse forms of the deity, discussed potential etymological connections to the obscure female deity name Njörun, mention of the mysterious sister-wife of Njörðr, proposed a variety of locations for where the procession may have occurred (generally in Denmark), and considered Tacitus's sources for his description.

Tacitus's Nerthus has had some influence on popular culture, and in particular the now widely rejected manuscript reading of Hertha in Germany.

== Etymology ==
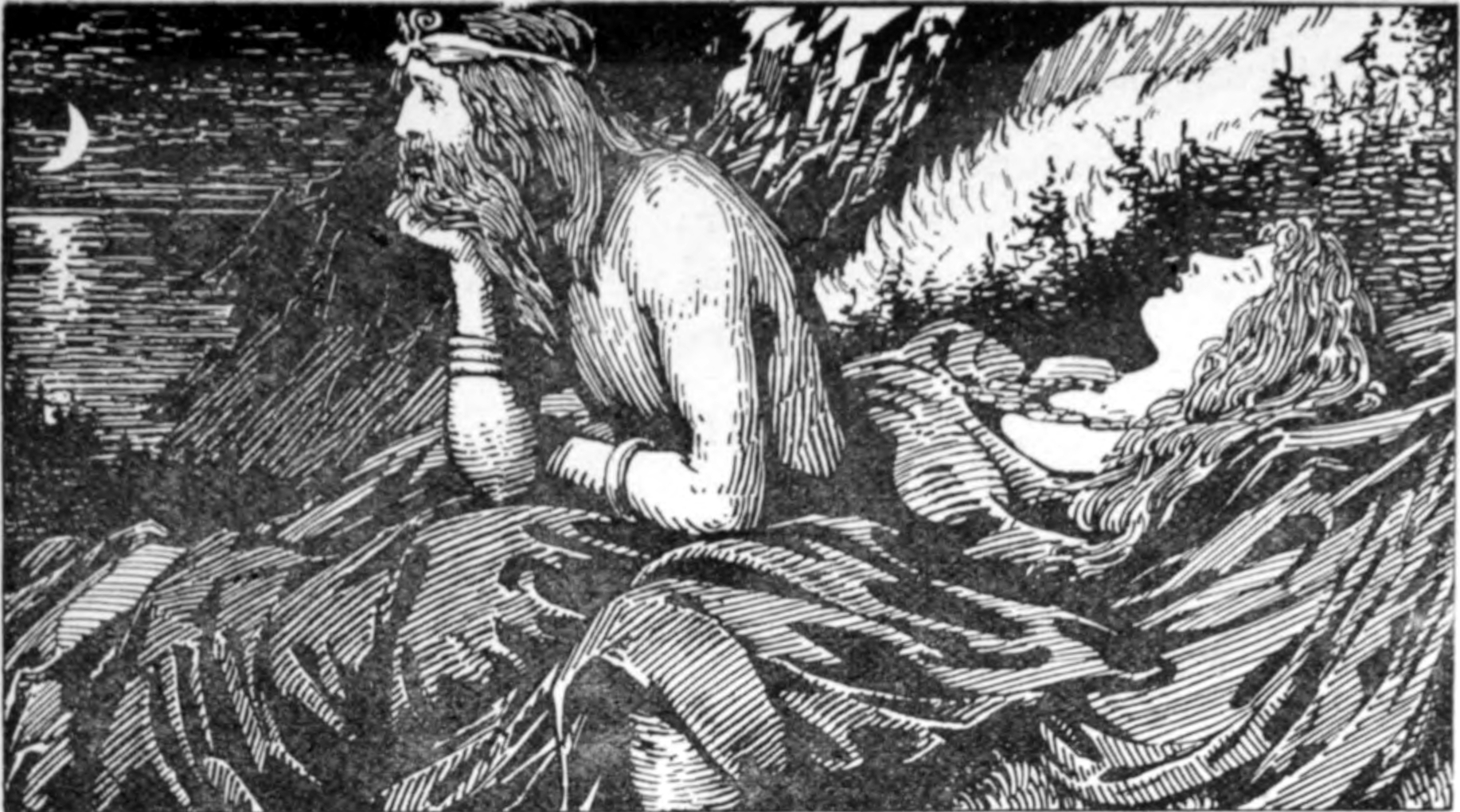
Njörd's desire for the Sea by W. G. Collingwood, 1908

Scholars commonly identify the goddess Nerthus with Njörðr, a deity who is attested in Old Norse texts and in numerous Scandinavian place names. A major reason for this is etymology: Scholars identify the Romano-Germanic Nerthus as the exact expected linguistic precursor to the Old Norse deity name Njörðr and have reconstructed the form as Proto-Germanic *Nerþuz. (Note: "Most scholars accept that the name Njǫrðr, the wealthy hostage sent to the Æsir and the father of Freyr and Freyja, is identical to that of a goddess Nerthus "or Mother Earth" described by Tacitus Lindow (2020c), p. 33; "... since Jacob Grimm, the form Nerthum has been preferred due to its relation to the Old Norse name Njǫrðr" Janson (2018), pp. 10–11; "Nerthus has long been seen as the etymon of Njǫrðr." North (1997), p. 20; "Since the name Nerthus corresponds phonetically to that of Njǫrðr scholars have accepted her as his female counterpart." Motz (1992), p. 3; "Nerthus cannot be other than Njörd ..." Dumézil (1977), p. 18; "The Scandinavian Njord ... must be the one described by Tacitus under the name Nerthus ..."; Turville-Petre (1964), p. 172; "strange has been the history of this goddess Nerthus in modern times. Sixteenth century scholars found irresistible the temptation to emend the name of 'Mother Earth' into Herthum, which nineteenth century scholars further improved into Hertham, Ertham. For many years this false goddess drove out the rightful deity from the fortieth chapter of the Germania" Chambers (2001), p. 70 (orig 1917).) As outlined by philologist John McKinnell, "Nerthus > *Njarðuz (breaking) > *Njǫrðuz > Njǫrðr". Scholars have additionally linked both Nerthus and Njörðr to the obscure Old Norse goddess name Njörun. (Note: See for example Hopkins (2012), p. 39: "From this survey we may conclude that academic consensus is that Njǫrun is potentially related to Njǫrðr and so too to the Proto-Germanic forebear of the name, *Nerþuz")

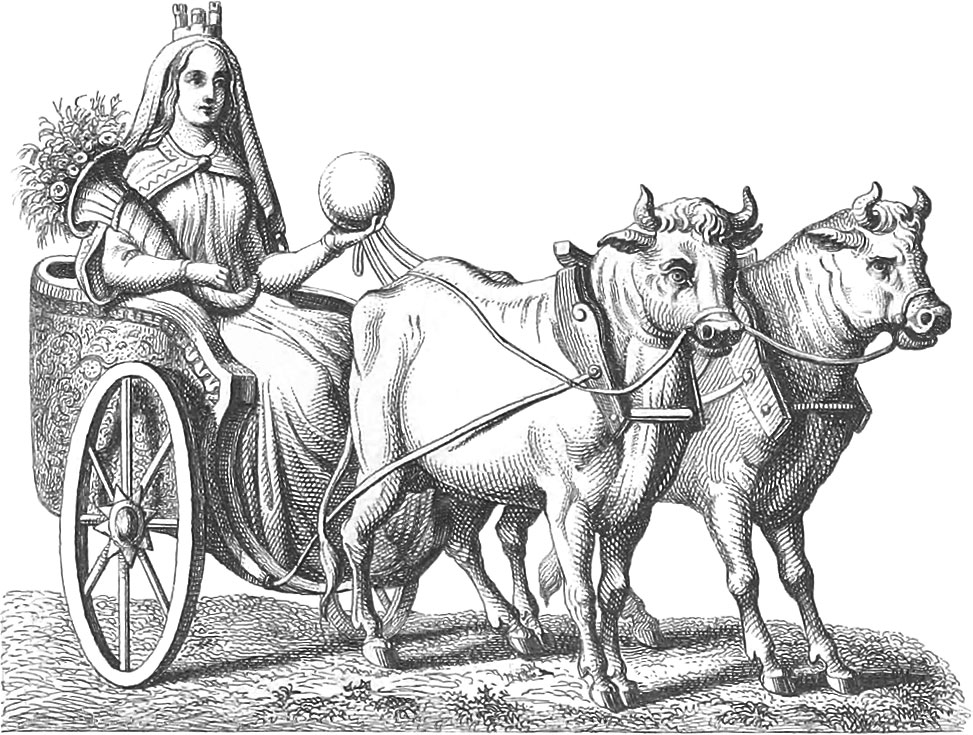
Nerthus by Johann Georg Heck.

The meaning of the theonym is unclear, but seems to be cognate with Old Irish nert, meaning 'strength', perhaps meaning 'the powerful one', and the GPC dictionary of the Welsh language lists the word 'nerthus' meaning 'strong, powerful, mighty, efficacious', cognate with Middle Breton 'nerzus'. The name may be related to Old English geneorð, meaning 'contented', and the Old English place name Neorxnawang, used to gloss the word 'paradise' in Old English texts, or the word north. According to philologist Jaan Puhvel, "*Nerthuz is etymologically ambivalent, cognate not only with Old Irish nert 'strength' and Greek andro- but with Vedic sū-nrt́ā 'good vigor, vitality' (used especially for Uṣás, thus gender ambivalent)". According to McKinnell, "The meaning of the name has usually been connected with Old Irish nert 'strength' (so 'the powerful one'), but it might be related to Old English geneorð 'contented' and neorxnawang 'paradise' (literally 'field of contentment'), or to the word 'north' (i.e. 'deity of the northern people', cf. Greek νέρτερος 'belonging to the underworld')".

== Germania ==
In chapter 40 of his ethnography Germania, Roman historian Tacitus, discussing the Suebian tribes of Germania, writes that, beside the populous Semnones and warlike Langobardi, there are seven more remote Suebian tribes; the Reudigni, Aviones, Anglii, Varini, Eudoses, Suarines, and Nuitones. The seven tribes are surrounded by rivers and forests and, according to Tacitus, there is nothing particularly worthy of comment about them as individuals, yet they are particularly distinguished as a group in that they all worship the goddess Nerthus. The chapter reads as follows:

Latin:

Contra Langobardos paucitas nobilitat: plurimis ac valentissimis nationibus cincti non per obsequium, sed proeliis ac periclitando tuti sunt. Reudigni deinde et Aviones et Anglii et Varini et Eudoses et Suardones et Nuithones fluminibus aut silvis muniuntur. Nec quicquam notabile in singulis, nisi quod in commune Nerthum, id est Terram matrem, colunt eamque intervenire rebus hominum, invehi populis arbitrantur. Est in insula Oceani castum nemus, dicatumque in eo vehiculum, veste contectum; attingere uni sacerdoti concessum. Is adesse penetrali deam intellegit vectamque bubus feminis multa cum veneratione prosequitur. Laeti tunc dies, festa loca, quaecumque adventu hospitioque dignatur. Non bella ineunt, non arma sumunt; clausum omne ferrum; pax et quies tunc tantum nota, tunc tantum amata, donec idem sacerdos satiatam conversatione mortalium deam templo reddat. Mox vehiculum et vestes et, si credere velis, numen ipsum secreto lacu abluitur. Servi ministrant, quos statim idem lacus haurit. Arcanus hinc terror sanctaque ignorantia, quid sit illud, quod tantum perituri vident.

A. R. Birley translation:

By contrast, the Langobardi are distinguished by being few in number. Surrounded by many mighty peoples they have protected themselves not by submissiveness but by battle and boldness. Next to them come the Ruedigni, Aviones, Anglii, Varini, Eudoses, Suarines, and Huitones, protected by river and forests. There is nothing especially noteworthy about these states individually, but they are distinguished by a common worship of Nerthus, that is, Mother Earth, and believes that she intervenes in human affairs and rides through their peoples. There is a sacred grove on an island in the Ocean, in which there is a consecrated chariot, draped with cloth, where the priest alone may touch. He perceives the presence of the goddess in the innermost shrine and with great reverence escorts her in her chariot, which is drawn by female cattle. There are days of rejoicing then and the countryside celebrates the festival, wherever she designs to visit and to accept hospitality. No one goes to war, no one takes up arms, all objects of iron are locked away, then and only then do they experience peace and quiet, only then do they prize them, until the goddess has had her fill of human society and the priest brings her back to her temple. Afterwards the chariot, the cloth, and, if one may believe it, the deity herself are washed in a hidden lake. The slaves who perform this office are immediately swallowed up in the same lake. Hence arises dread of the mysterious, and piety, which keeps them ignorant of what only those about to perish may see.

Harold Mattingly translation:

The Langobardi, by contrast, are distinguished by the fewness of their numbers. Ringed round as they are by many mighty peoples, they find safety not in obsequiousness but in battle and its perils. After them come the Reudingi, Aviones, Anglii, Varini, Eudoses, Suarini and Nuitones, behind their ramparts of rivers and woods. There is nothing noteworthy about these peoples individually, but they are distinguished by a common worship of Nerthus, or Mother Earth. They believe that she interests herself in human affairs and rides among their peoples. In an island of the Ocean stands a sacred grove, and in the grove a consecrated cart, draped with cloth, which none but the priest may touch. The priest perceives the presence of the goddess in this holy of holies and attends her, in deepest reverence, as her cart is drawn by heifers. Then follow days of rejoicing and merry-making in every place that she designs to visit and be entertained. No one goes to war, no one takes up arms; every object of iron is locked away; then, and only then, are peace and quiet known and loved, until the priest again restores the goddess to her temple, when she has had her fill of human company. After that the cart, the cloth and, if you care to believe it, the goddess herself are washed clean in a secluded lake. This service is performed by slaves who are immediately afterwards drowned in the lake. Thus mystery begets terror and pious reluctance to ask what the sight can be that only those doomed to die may see.

== Tacitus's sources ==
Tacitus does not provide information regarding his sources for his description of Nerthus (nor the rest of Germania). Tacitus's account may stem from earlier but now lost literary works (such as perhaps Pliny the Elder's lost Bella Germaniae), potentially his own experiences in Germania, or merchants and soldiers, such as Germanic peoples in Rome, or Germania and Romans who spent time in the region. (Note: For example, according to James B. Rives, "... Tacitus may very well have served on the Germanic frontier himself, and certainly would have had many opportunities to talk both with Romans who had experience in Germania and with Germani serving in the Roman army" Mattingly (2009), p. xlii. See also discussion in Bintley (2015), pp. 86–87.)

Tacitus's Germania places particular emphasis on the Semnones, and scholars have suggested that some or all of Tacitus's information may come from King Masyas of the Semnones and/or his high priestess, the seeress Ganna. The two visited Rome for a blessing from Roman emperor Domitian in 92 AD. While Tacitus appears to have been away from Rome during this period, he would have had plenty of opportunity to gain information provided by King Masyas and Ganna from those who spent time with the two during their visit. (Note: For example, according to North (1997), p. 22, "Tacitus's informant may have been King Masyos of the Semnones, who visited Rome in 92 [CE]: The Semnones are described in preferential detail in ch. 39, immediately before the account of Nerthus in ch. 40". See also discussion in Bintley (2015), pp. 86–87.)

== Reception ==
Tacitus's description of the Nerthus procession has been the subject of extensive discussion from scholars.

=== Name and manuscript variations ===
All surviving manuscripts of Tacitus's Germania date from around the fifteenth century and these display significant variation in the name of the goddess: All attested forms are in accusative case and include Nertum (yielding the nominate form Nerthus), Herthum (implying a nominative form of Hertha) and several others (including Nechtum, Neithum, Neherthum, and Verthum).

Of the various forms found in the extant Germania manuscript tradition, two have yielded significant discussion among scholars since at least the nineteenth century, Nerthus and Hertha. Hertha was popular in some of the earliest layers of Germania scholarship, such as the edition of Beatus Rhenanus. These scholars linked the name with a common German word for Earth (compare modern German Erde). This reading has subsequently been rejected by most scholars. Since pioneering nineteenth century philologist Jacob Grimm's identification of the form Nerthus as the etymological precursor to the Old Norse deity name Njǫrðr, the reading Nerthus has been widely accepted as correct in scholarship.

In 1902, the Codex Aesinas (often abbreviated as E) was discovered, and it was also found to contain the form Nertum, yielding the reading Nerthus. The Codex Aesinas is a fifteenth-century composite manuscript that is considered a direct copy of the Codex Hersfeldensis, the oldest identifiable manuscript of the text. All other manuscripts of Tacitus's Germania are thought by scholars to stem from the Codex Aesinas. (Note: As summarized by M.J. Towsell, "The modern textual history of the Germania begins ... with the fifteenth-century humanist manuscript known as the Codex Aesinas, which appears to be the source of all the other Germania manuscripts (and very many copies were made in the Renaissance, all of which appear to be direct or indirect copies of this single manuscript)." Toswell (2010), p. 30. Regarding Nerthus and the Codex Aesinas, see discussion in Lindow (2020b), p. 1331.)

Some scholars have continued suggesting alternate readings to Nerthus. For example, in 1992, Lotte Motz proposes that the linguistic correspondence is a coincidence and that "The variant nertum was chosen by Grimm because it corresponds to Njǫrðr". (Note: Motz, however, states that she does not propose the reading Hertha: "I do not wish to advocate the name Hertha for the goddess; I merely wish to state that the phonetic coincidence of the variant with the name of an Eddic god does not suffice to support an identify of the two numina." Motz (1992), pp. 3–4) Instead, Motz propose that various female entities from the continental Germanic folklore record, particularly those in central Germany and the Alps, stem from a single source, whom she identifies as Nerthus, and that migrating Germanic peoples brought the goddess to those regions from coastal Scandinavia. After her death, Motz's proposal received support from Rudolf Simek. John Lindow rejects Motz's proposal and Simek's support. He highlights the presence of the form in the Codex Aesinas (discovered in 1902, while Grimm died in 1863), and asks, "would it not be an extraordinary coincidence that a deity who fits the pattern of the later fertility gods should have a name that is etymologically identical with one of them?" (Note: Lindow (2020a), p. 108 says: "Rudolf Simek takes seriously the suggestion of Motz (1992) that other name forms in the humanist editions of Germania are as valid as Nerthus and that the deity in ch. 40 has nothing to do with Njǫrðr but rather should be associated with Frau Percht or Frau Holle in recent folklore Simek (2003), pp. 56–57. But as Simek admits, Nerthus has manuscript witness. Furthermore, Motz's argument for conceptual similarities seems forced." Lindow (2020b), p. 1331.)

=== Location ===
Scholars have proposed a variety of locations for Tacitus's account of Nerthus. For example, Anders Andrén says:

In the accounts of specific Germanic tribes, Tacitus also writes about the divine twins, the Alcis, among the Naharvali, and about the goddess Nerthus among a group of tribes, probably located in the southern part of present-day Denmark.

Some scholars have proposed that the location of the Nerthus procession occurred on Zealand in Denmark. They link the Nerthus with the medieval place name Niartharum (modern Nærum) located on Zealand. Further justification is given in that Lejre, the seat of the ancient kings of Denmark, is also located on Zealand. Nerthus is then commonly compared to the goddess Gefjon, who is said to have plowed the island of Zealand from Sweden in the Prose Edda book Gylfaginning and in Lejre wed the legendary Danish king Skjöldr.

Chambers notes that the mistaken name Hertha (see Name and manuscript variations above) led to the hydronym Herthasee, a lake on the German island of Rügen, which antiquarians proposed as a potential location of the Nerthus site described in Tacitus. However, along with the rejection of the reading Hertha, the location is no longer considered to be a potential site.

=== Gender difference between Nerthus and Njörðr ===
Although Njörðr etymologically descends from *Nerþuz, Tacitus describes Nerthus female while the Old Norse deity Njörðr is male. The form *Nerþuz does not indicate whether the deity was considered male or female. This difference in gender between the two has resulted in significant discussion from scholars. A variety of reasons for this difference have been proposed: Over the years, scholars have variously proposed that that Nerthus was likely one of a pair of deities in a manner similar to Njörðr's incestuous children Freyr and Freyja (perhaps involving hieros gamos), that Nerthus was a hermaphroditic deity, that the deity's gender simply changed from female to male over time, or that Tacitus's account mistakes Nerthus for a female deity rather than male deity. Others have proposed that a 'female Njörðr' continues into the Old Norse corpus as the sister-wife of Njörðr and/or in the goddess name Njörun.

=== Wagons, wagon processions, the Vanir, and cyclical rituals ===
Scholars associate Tacitus's description of Nerthus's vehiculum (translated above by Birley as "chariot" and by Mattingly as "cart") ritually deposited in a lacus (translated by Birley and Mattingly above as "lake") with ceremonial wagons found ritually placed in peat bogs around Tacitus's time, ceremonial wagons from the Viking Age, and descriptions of ceremonial wagon processions in Old Norse texts. Notable examples include the Dejbjerg wagon—in fact a composite of two wagons—discovered in western Jutland, Denmark. (Note: For example, as Gunnell (1995) puts it, "that such a wagon existed in real life is supported by archaeological evidence in the form of two early Iron Age wagons that were deposited in the bogs at Dejbjerg, Jylland, at a time close to that of Tacitus's account. It is highly tempting to draw direct parallels between these wagons and those of Nerthus and Freyr described above.") A wagon from the Viking Age was found in the Oseberg ship burial in Norway. This wagon may have been incapable of turning corners and may have been used solely for ritual purposes. The ship burial contains tapestry fragments, today known as the Oseberg tapestry fragments. These fragments depict a wagon procession.

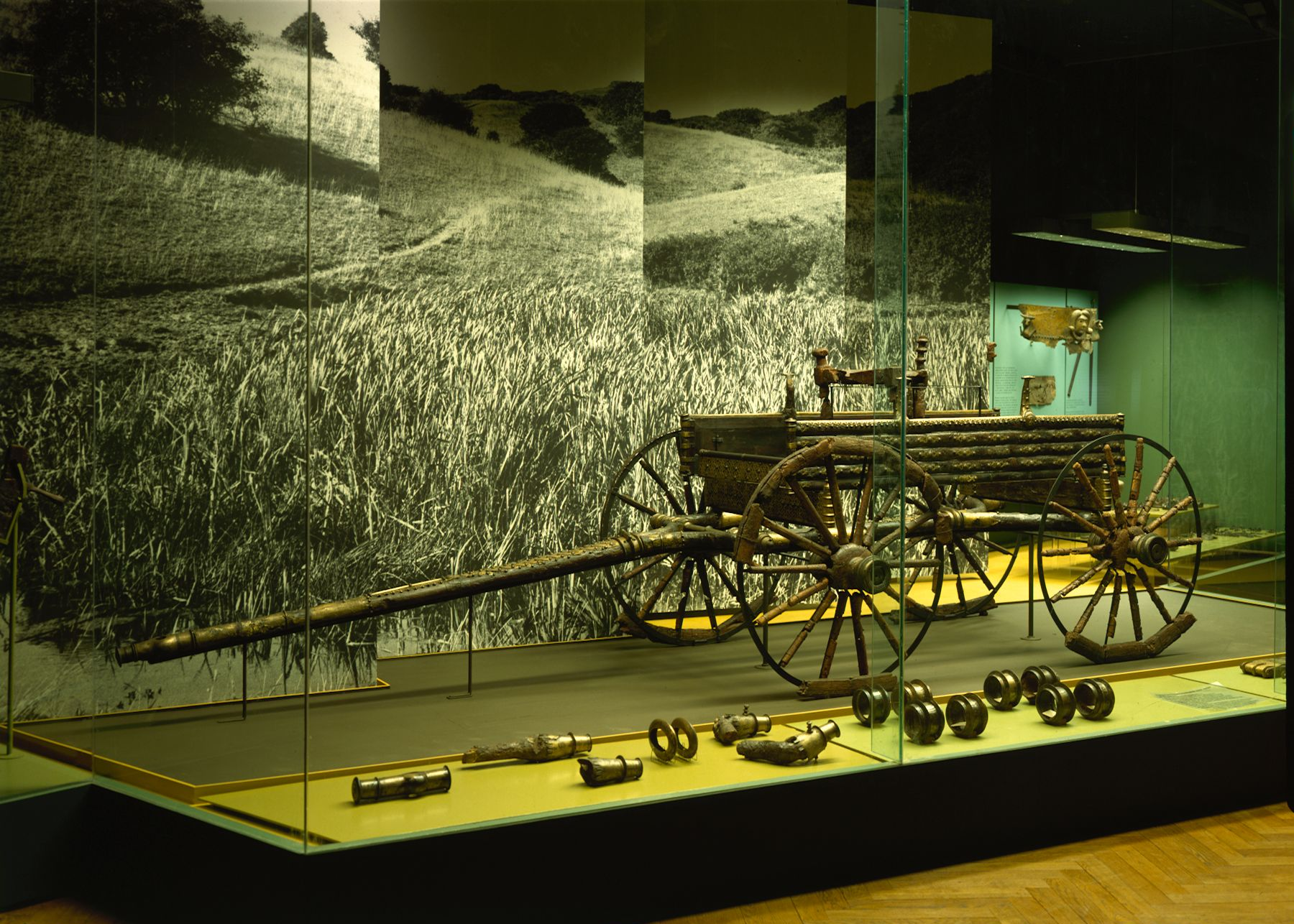
The Dejbjerg wagon on display at the National Museum of Denmark, found deposited in a peat bog in Denmark and dating from around Tacitus's time

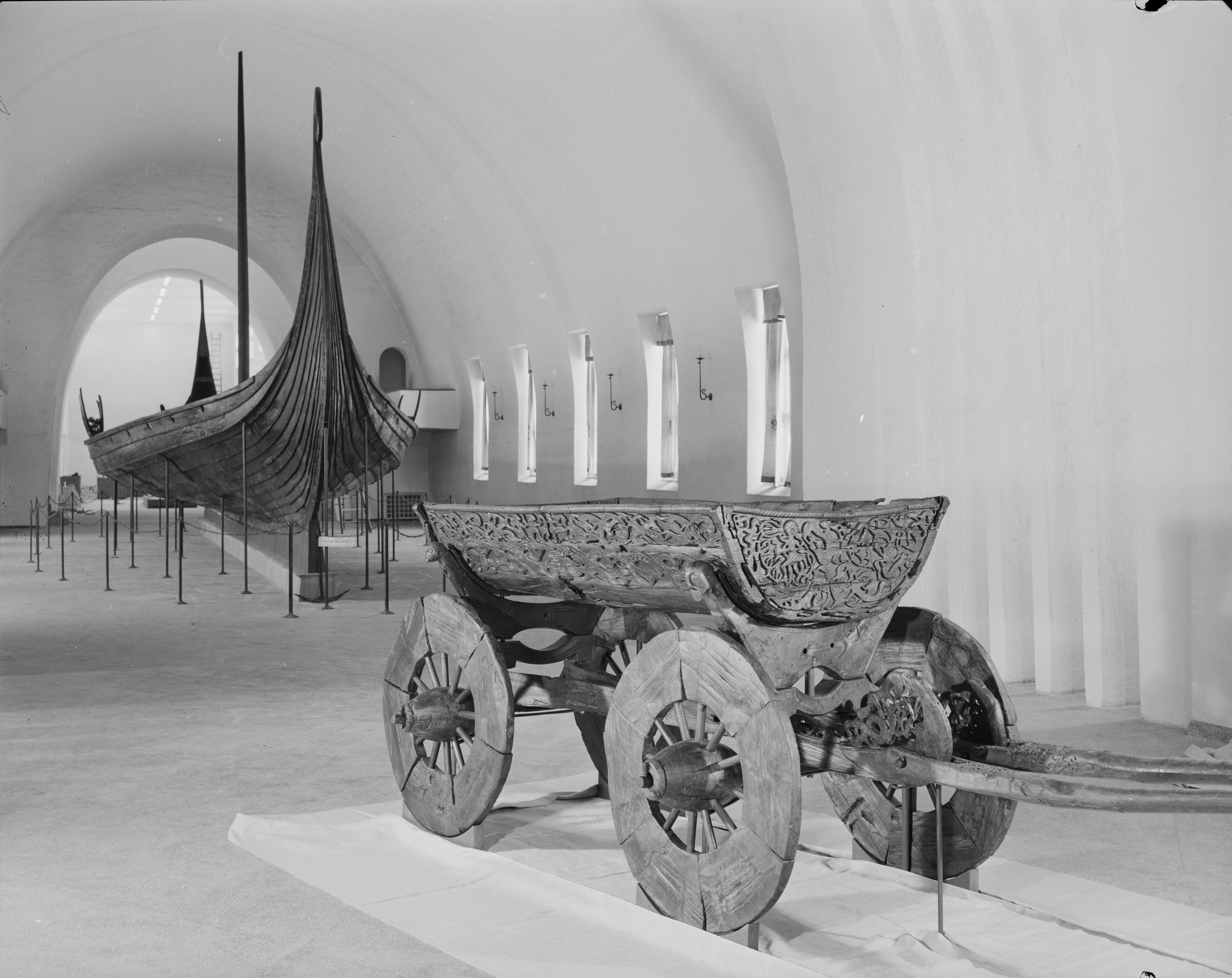
The reconstructed ceremonial wagon found in the Viking Age Oseberg ship burial. One side of the wagon features a depiction of nine cats.

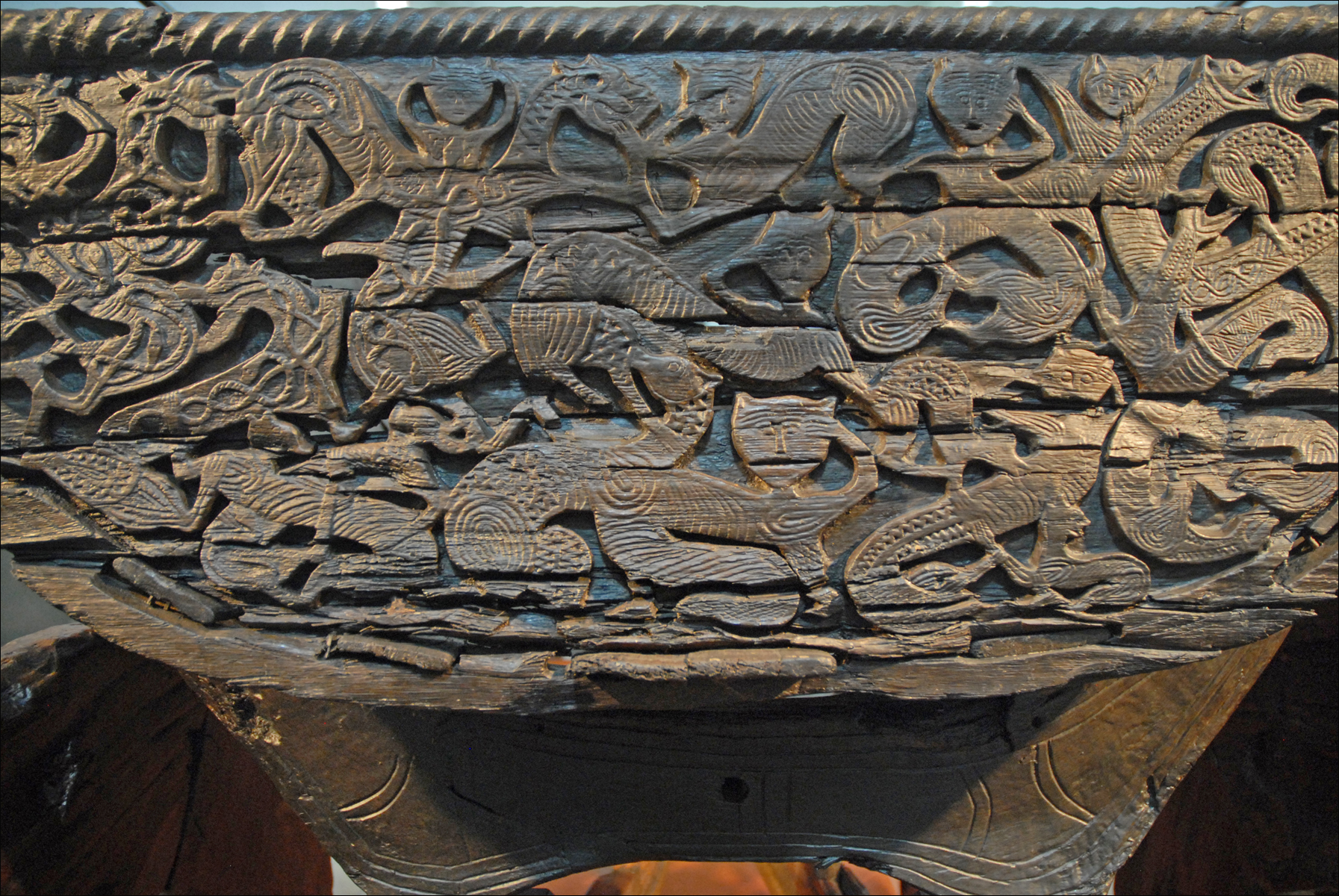
Detail of the Oseberg wagon's depiction of nine cats

In Norse mythology, Njörðr is strongly associated with water, and he and his children, Freyr and Freyja, are particularly associated with wagons. Together this family is known in Old Norse sources as the Vanir. Njörðr is referred to as "god of wagons" (Old Norse vagna guð) in the principal manuscript of Skáldskaparmál (the Codex Regius). (Note: According to John Lindow, "... we should accept that Snorri knew more valid kennings than are attested in the verse he cites. For example, he tells that Njǫrðr may be kenned as vagna guð (god of wagons), which can be associated with the wagon that pulled Nerthus in Tacitus. We do not think that the association is fortuitous." Lindow (2020a), p. 78; further discussion Lindow (2020b), p. 1333. "With regard to Nerthus and the vehiculum in ch. 40 of Germania, Njǫrðr is known as vagna guð ('god of wagons') in a scaldic kenning cited in the principal manuscript of Skáldskaparmál" North (1997), p. 24.) According to the Prose Edda, Freyja drives a chariot driven by cats, which scholars have linked to the depiction of nine cats on the Oseberg ship burial wagon, potentially indicating a wagon procession featuring the goddess. Dated to the fourteenth century, Ögmundar þáttr dytts tells of a ritual wagon procession wherein a depiction of Freyr is driven around in a wagon by a priestess in a manner scholars have compared to Tacitus's description.

Similar wagon procession-narratives may be found in two other texts, namely a description of a deity name Lýtir in Flateyjarbók and one featuring Frotho in Gesta Danorum, who is driven around for three days after his death so that the country wouldn't crumble. Both of these names have been interpreted by scholars as likely bynames for Freyr. (Note: Noting a comparable episode in Ynglinga saga describing a euhemerized account of Freyr's death and Saxo's description of Frotho's death, John Lindow notes that "clearly the two figures played out the same mythic pattern, and many scholars think they may have been the same figure Lindow (2001), p. 124. On Lýtir and Freyr, see Simek (2007), pp. 198–199.)

Some scholars have interpreted this to reflect that this procession occurred as a cyclic ritual associated with the Vanir. According to Jens Peter Schjødt,

"if we accept a close relationship among, perhaps even an identity of, Nerthus, Freyr, and Frotho ... it appears that these three descriptions are all part of a discourse connecting gods of the vanir type with circumambulations and thus with processions focusing on yearly rituals".

Schjødt further writes:

Cyclical rituals have no doubt taken place during several millennia in the North as well as everywhere else. One of the most famous descriptions of such a ritual from the Early Iron Age is Tacitus's description of the Nerthus ritual in Germania ch. 40. Although it is not said explicitly that this is a cyclical ritual, there is no doubt that it is recurring and that it involves the whole community. Like with most other rituals of this type, we are not told at what time of the year the Nerthus procession took place, but since it is clearly a ritual connected with fertility and peace, we may conjecture that it was not during the summer, which was the season for war and other kinds of male activities.

Hilda Davidson draws a parallel between these incidents and Tacitus's account of Nerthus, suggesting that in addition a neck-ring-wearing female figure "kneeling as if to drive a chariot" also dates from the Bronze Age. Davidson says that the evidence suggests that similar customs as detailed in Tacitus's account continued to exist during the close of the pagan period through worship of the Vanir.

=== Bog bodies ===
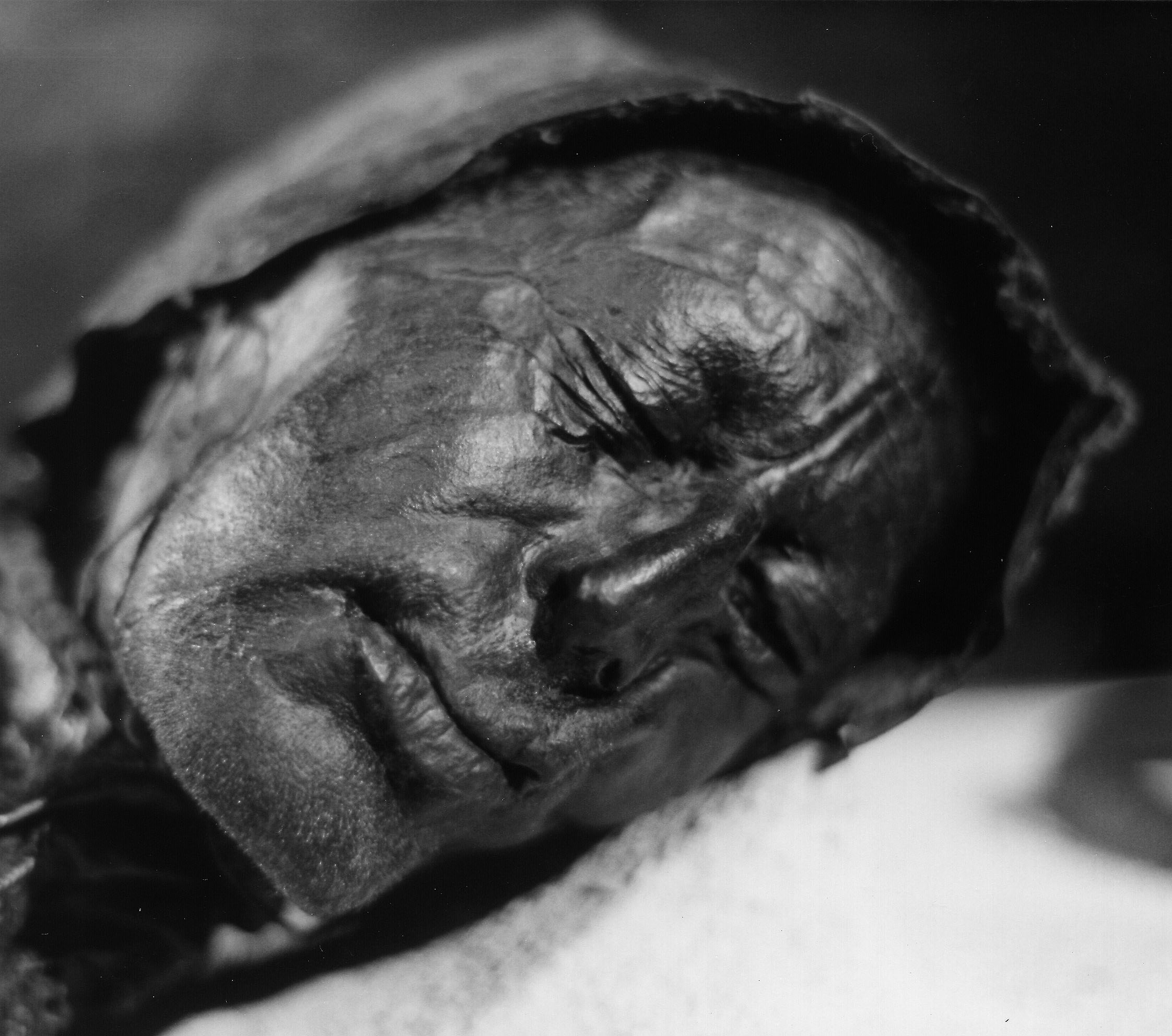
The face of the Tollund Man, a well-preserved ritually deposited bog body found in Denmark and dated to the fourth century BC

Known as bog bodies, numerous well-preserved human remains have been found in peat bogs in Northern Europe. Like the wagons interred in peat bogs discussed above, these bodies were intentionally and ritually placed. Various scholars have linked Tacitus's description of drowned slaves in a "lake" as a reference to the interment of human corpses in peat bogs. For example, according to archaeologist Peter Vilhelm Glob:

The description of the goddess' attendants in the lake on the completion of the rites recalls the sacrificed bog people. There is indeed much to suggest that the bog people were participants in ritual celebrations of this kind, which culminated in their death and deposition in the bogs.

=== "Mother Earth" and the Roman cult of Cybele ===
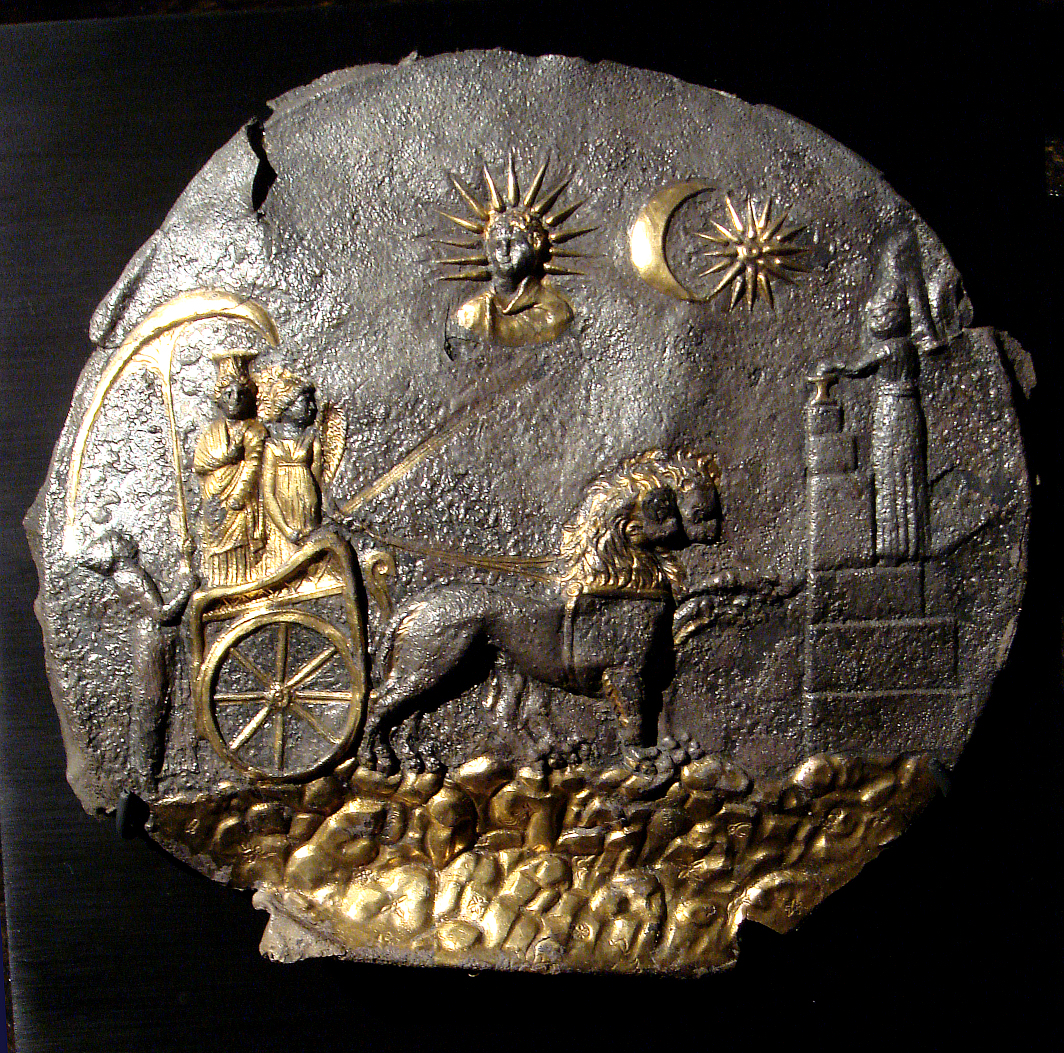
A depiction of the Phrygian goddess Cybele with a chariot led by cats dated to the third century BC

In his description of Nerthus, Tacitus refers to the goddess as "Mother Earth" (Terra Mater). This has been received by scholars in a variety of ways and affected early manuscript readings of the deity's name (especially Herthum, see "Name and manuscript variations" section above). In his assessment of the Old Norse personification of earth (Jörð, a goddess in Norse mythology), McKinnell says that the Old Norse earth personification does not appear to be notably connected to the Vanir, Njörðr and/or Nerthus. He concludes that "it seems likely that Tacitus equates Nerthus with Terra Mater as an interpretatio Romana, a translation into terms his Roman readers would find familiar". John Lindow says that Tacitus's "identification with Mother Earth probably has much less to do with Jörd in Scandinavian mythology than with fertility goddesses in many cultures".

The Phrygian goddess Cybele had been absorbed into the Roman pantheon by Tacitus's time, and Tacitus served as a priest in the cult of Cybele, which included duties such as washing a sacred cult stone. Similar to Tacitus's description of Nerthus, Cybele was at times closely connected to or conflated with the concept of Terra Mater ('Mother Earth') through her identity as Mater Deum ('Mother of the Gods'), and was at times depicted with a chariot pulled by lions.

== Modern influence ==
The minor planet 601 Nerthus is named after Nerthus. The form "Hertha" was adopted by several German football clubs.

Up until its superseding as the dominant reading, Hertha had some influence in German popular culture. For example, Hertha and Herthasee (see "location" section above) play major roles in German novelist Theodor Fontane's 1896 novel Effi Briest.

Nerþuz is a character who appears in Fire Emblem Heroes.

Herta (named The Great Herta in the game) is a character from Honkai: Star Rail.

== See also ==
- Auðumbla, a primeval cow in the mythology of the North Germanic peoples
- Baduhenna, a Germanic goddess mentioned by Tacitus in Annals
- "Isis" of the Suebi, another apparently Germanic goddess mentioned by Tacitus in Germania
- Nereus, a deity and son of the sea and earth in Greek mythology
- Tamfana, another Germanic goddess mentioned by Tacitus in Annals

== Sources ==
- Andrén, A. (2020). "The spatial and temporal frame". In Schjødt, Jens Peter; Lindow, John; A., Anders (eds.). The Pre-Christian Religions of the North. History and structures. Vol. I: Basic premises and consideration of sources. Brepols. pp. 135–160.
- Bintley, Michael D.J. (2015). Trees in the Religions of Early Medieval England. Boydell Press. ISBN 9781843839897.
- Agricola and Germany. Translated by Birley, A.R. Oxford University Press. 1999. ISBN 978-0-19-283300-6.
- Chambers, R.W. (2001) [1912]. Widsith: A study in Old English heroic legend. Cambridge University Press. ISBN 9781108015271.
- de Vries, Jan (1977). Altnordisches Etymologisches Worterbuch [Old Norse Etymological Dictionary] (in German). Brill.
- Jónsson, Finnur (1931). Lexicon Poeticum. S.L. Møllers bogtrykkeri.
- Glob, P. V. (2004) [1965]. The Bog People: Iron Age Man Preserved. Translated by Bruce-Mitford, Rupert. New York Review Books. ISBN 9781590170908 – via Internet Archive.
- Gunnell, Terry (1995). The Origins of Drama in Scandinavia. D.S. Brewer. ISBN 9780859914581.
- Chadwick, Hector Munro. 1907. The Origin of the English Nation. ISBN 0-941694-09-7
- Dumézil, Georges (1988). Gods of the Ancient Northmen. University of California Press.
- Davidson, H.E. (1988). Myths and Symbols in Pagan Europe: Early Scandinavian and Celtic religions. Manchester University Press.
- Hardy, Barbara (March 1999). "Tellers and listeners in Effi Briest". Theodor Fontane and the European Context: Literature, culture, and society in Prussia and Europe. Interdisciplinary Symposium at the Institute of Germanic Studies. University of London: Rodopi (published 2010). ISBN 9789042012363.
- Hopkins, Joseph (2012). "Goddesses unknown I: Njǫrun and the sister-wife of Njǫrðr". RMN Newsletter. Vol. 5. pp. 39–44 – via academia.edu.
- Ásdísardóttir, Ingunn (2020). "Freyja". In Schjødt, Jens Peter; Lindow, John; A., Anders (eds.). The Pre-Christian Religions of the North. History and structures. Vol. III: Social, geographical, and historic contexts, and communication between worlds. Brepols. pp. 1273–1302.
- Lindow, John (2020a). "Written Sources". In Schjødt, Jens Peter; Lindow, John; A., Anders (eds.). The Pre-Christian Religions of the North. History and structures. Vol. I: Basic premises and consideration of sources. Brepols. pp. 63–101.
- Lindow, John (2020b). "Njǫrðr". In Schjødt, Jens Peter; Lindow, John; A., Anders (eds.). The Pre-Christian Religions of the North. History and structures. Vol. III: Social, geographical, and historic contexts, and communication between worlds. Brepols. pp. 1331–1344.
- Lindow, John (2020c). Old Norse Mythology. Oxford University Press.
- Lindow, John (2001). Norse Mythology: A guide to the gods, heroes, rituals, and beliefs. Oxford University Press. ISBN 0-19-515382-0.
- Tacitus, Publius Cornelius (2009). Agricola and Germania. Translated by Mattingly, Harold. Penguin Books. ISBN 978-0-140-45540-3.
- McKinnell, John (2005). Meeting the Other in Norse Myth and Legend. D.S. Brewer. ISBN 9781843840428.
- McKinnell, John (2022). "The Earth as body in Old Norse". Religionsvidenskabeligt Tidsskrift. 74: 534–550. doi:10.7146/rt.v74i.132122 – via academia.edu.
- Motz, L. (1992). "The Goddess Nerthus: A new approach". Amsterdamer Beiträge zur älteren Germanistik. 36: 1–19. doi:10.1163/18756719-03601002.
- North, Richard (1997). Heathen Gods in Old English Literature. Cambridge University Press. ISBN 9780521551830.
- Janson, Henrik (2018). "Pictured by the other: Classical and early Medieval perspectives on religions in the north". In McKinnell, John; Lindow, John; Ross, Margaret Clunies (eds.). The Pre-Christian Religions of the North. Brepols. pp. 7–40.
- Puhvel, Jaan (1989). Comparative Mythology. Johns Hopkins University Press. ISBN 9780801839382.
- Sanders, Karin (2009). Bodies in the Bog and the Archaeological Imagination. The University of Chicago Press. ISBN 9780226734040.
- Schjødt, Jens Peter (2020a). "Various ways of communicating". In Schjødt, Jens Peter; Lindow, John; A., Anders (eds.). The Pre-Christian Religions of the North. History and structures. Vol. III: Social, Geographical, and Historic Contexts, and Communication between Worlds. Brepols. pp. 589–642.
- Schjødt, Jens Peter (2020b). "Cyclical rituals". In Schjødt, Jens Peter; Lindow, John; A., Anders (eds.). The Pre-Christian Religions of the North. History and structures. Vol. II: Social, Geographical, and Historic Contexts, and Communication between Worlds. Brepols. pp. 797–822.
- Simek, Rudolf (2007). Dictionary of Northern Mythology. Translated by Hall, Angela. D.S. Brewer. ISBN 978-0-85991-513-7.
- Tacitus, Publius Cornelius (1916). Tacitus - Germania. Translated by Stuart, Duane Reed. The Macmillan Company.
- Sturtevant, Albert Morey (November 1952). "Regarding the Old Norse name Gefjon". Scandinavian Studies. 24 (4). ISSN 0036-5637.
- Toswell, M.J. (2010). "Quid Tacitus ... ? The Germania and the study of Anglo-Saxon England". Florilegium. 27: 27–62. doi:10.3138/flor.27.003.
- Turville-Petre, Gabriel (1964). Myth and Religion of the North: The religion of ancient Scandinavia. Weidenfeld and Nicolson.
