= Andrén =

Andrén or Andren is a surname. Notable people with the surname include:

- Anders Andrén (born 1952), Swedish archaeologist
- Arvid Andrén (1902–1999), Swedish art historian
- Gunnar Andrén (born 1946), Swedish politician
- Oscar Andrén (1899–1981), Swedish boxer
- Peter Andren (1946–2007), Australian politician
- Viktor Andrén (born 1994), Swedish ice hockey player
