= Dejbjerg wagon =

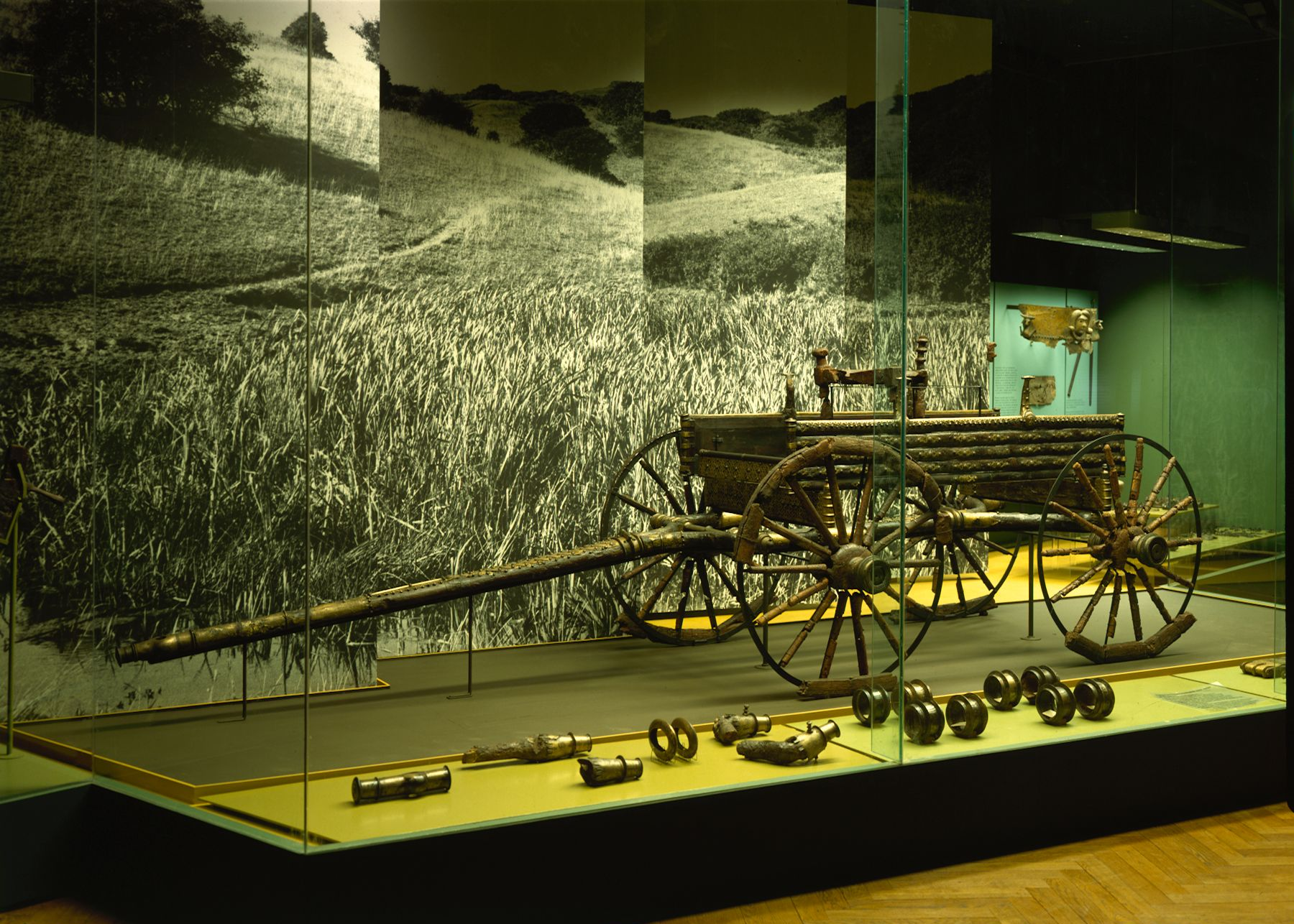
The Dejbjerg Wagon on display at the National Museum of Denmark

The Dejbjerg wagon (Danish Dejbjergvognen) is a composite of two ceremonial wagons found in a peat bog in Dejbjerg near Ringkøbing in western Jutland, Denmark. These votive deposits were dismantled and ritually placed in the bog around 100 BCE. As of 2022, the wagon is on display at the National Museum of Denmark.

== Cultural context ==
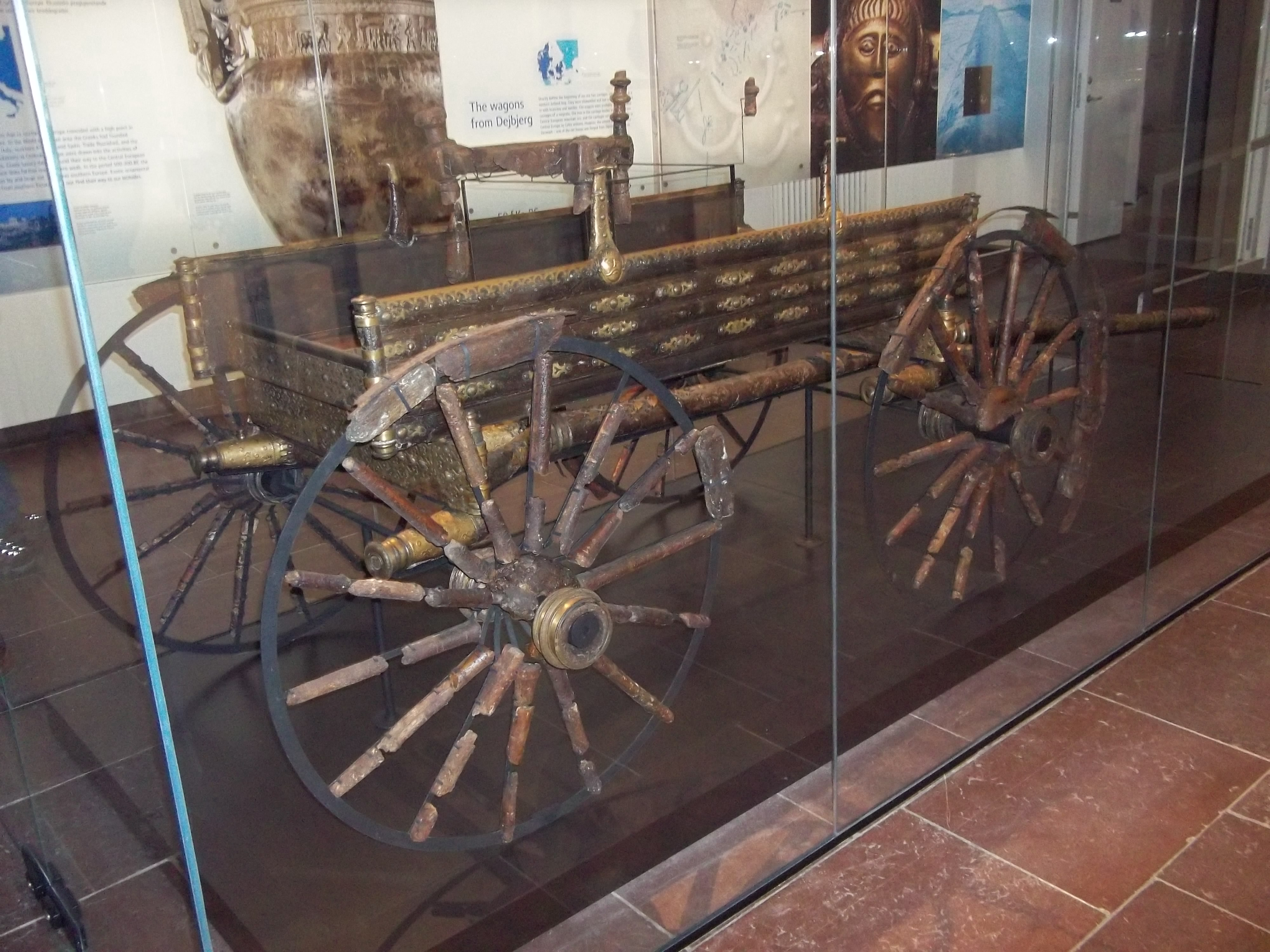
The Dejbjerg wagon, 1st century BC, in the National Museum of Denmark

The two wagons belong to a larger phenomenon of intentional placement of objects in bogs, generally interpreted as sacrifices to gods. The Dejbjerg Wagon was discovered during a period of intense peat bog extraction that occurred in the 19th and 20th centuries, largely by non-archaeologists. These excavations yielded many items dating from the entirety of the prehistoric period but especially from the Iron Age. Many of these objects include everyday items like ceramic vessels and wooden objects, but also more prestigious items, like war booty, the Dejbjerg Wagon, and the Gundestrup Cauldron. In addition to ritually placed objects, bog deposits include bog bodies, preserved human remains.

== Dejbjerg folklore ==
Prior to the discovery of the Dejbjerg Wagon, local folklore "told of wagons filled with gold which were supposed to be lying in a bog near the local vicarage, an account which was verified (to some degree) when the two famous Dejbjerg wagons from the Early iron age were later found in the bog in question in 1881–82". Folklorist Terry Gunnell highlights that this account is not unique, and that comparable legends can be found associated with certain bogs and lakes in southern Sweden. Gunnell notes that, "The key value of the legend in question (in association with the archaeological finds) is thus not so much that it might be based on a 'genuine' memory related to that particular lake. More importantly, it suggests that the gold wagon legends in general would seem to have some basis in ancient truth and shared social memory." Gunnell compares this complex of legends to the sword found underwater by Beowulf (in Beowulf), and comments that "these accounts appear to have roots in faint memories of the ritual depositions of objects in water which took place during the Bronze and Iron Ages, activities for which the later storytellers had no evidence and no personal memory, but which have since been given substance by archaeological evidence. This is why modern archaeologists tend to collect local legends relating to sites that they are investigating: there is always a possibility that they may contain a kernel of truth."

== Gallery ==
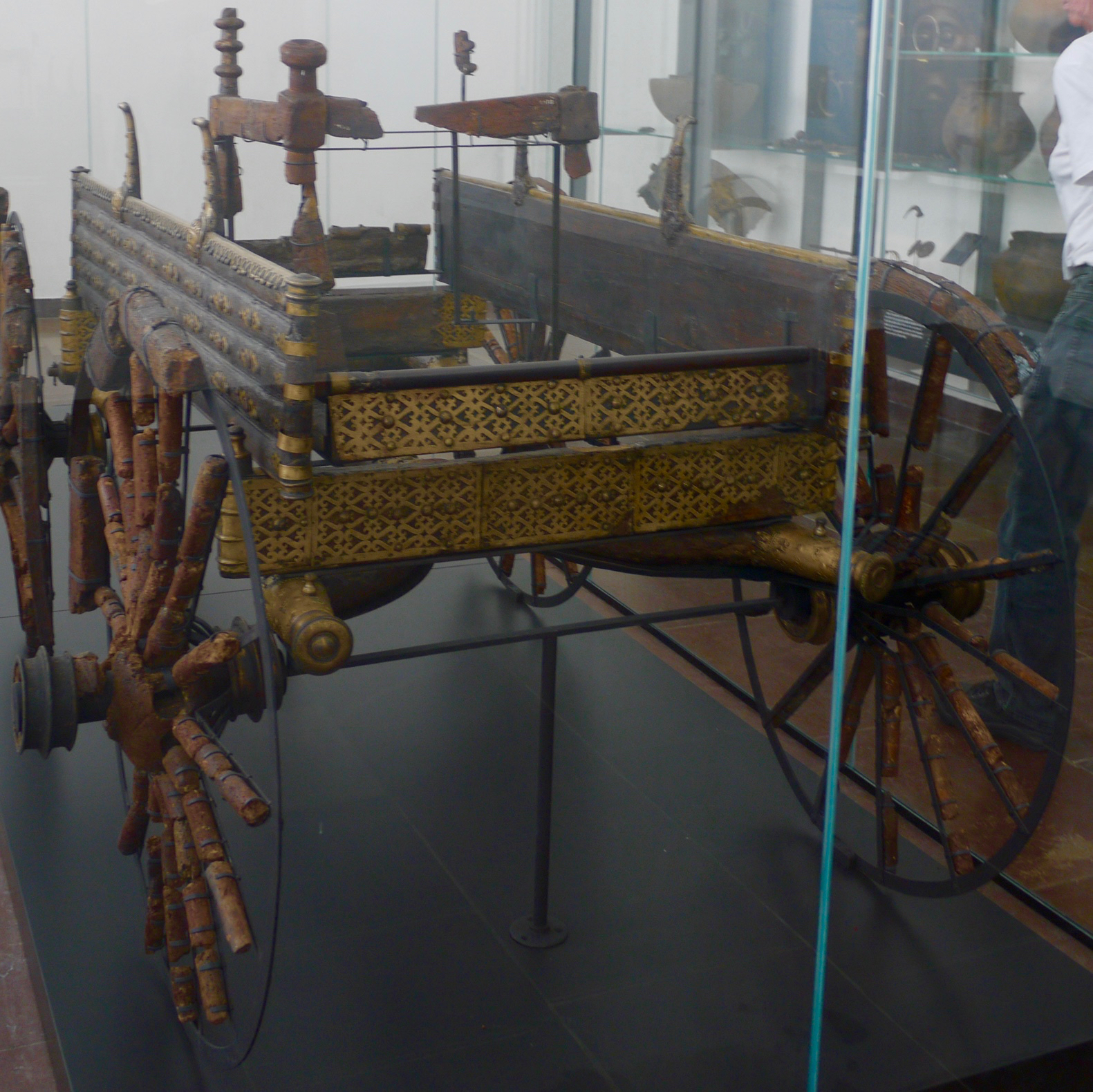

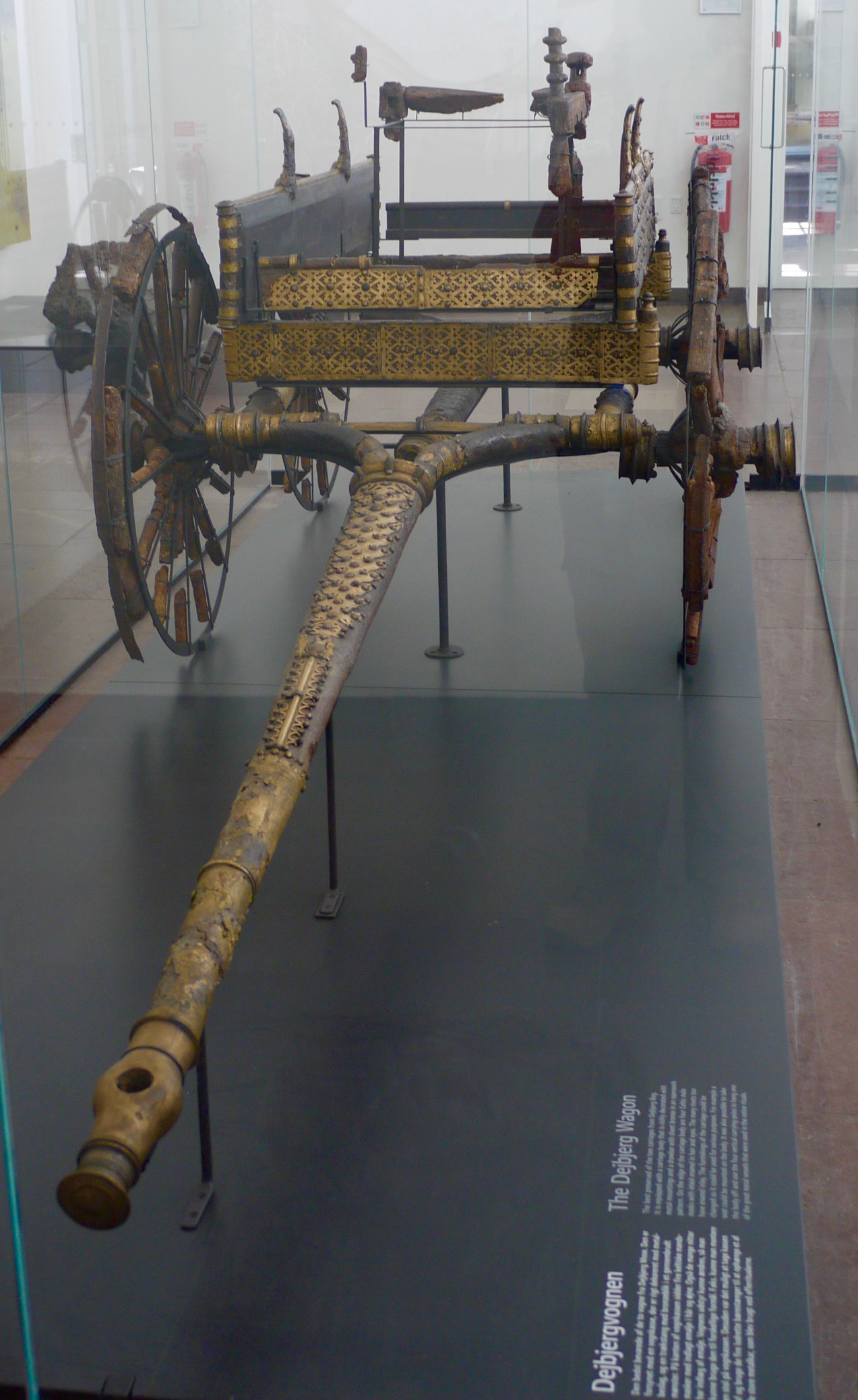

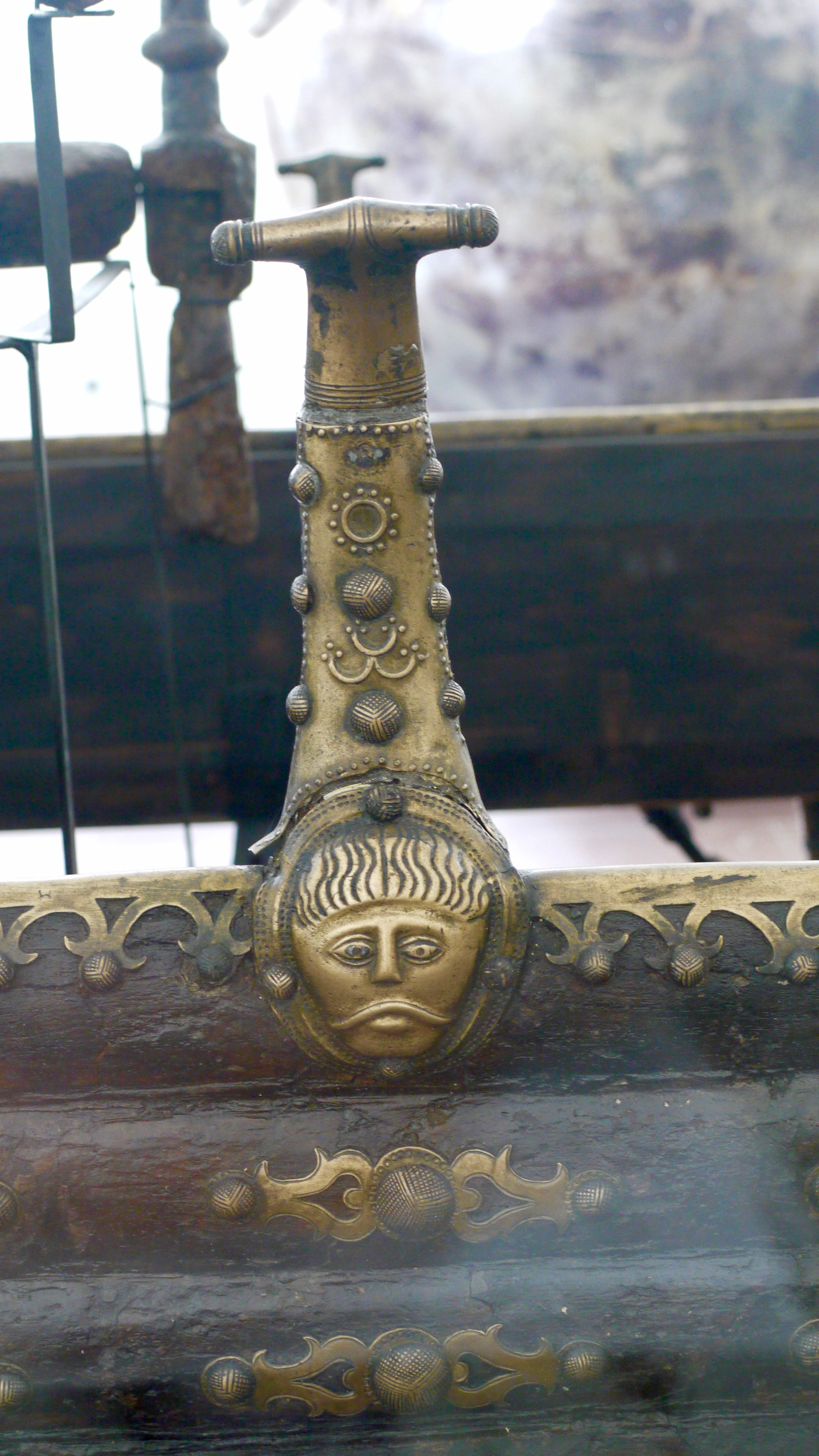

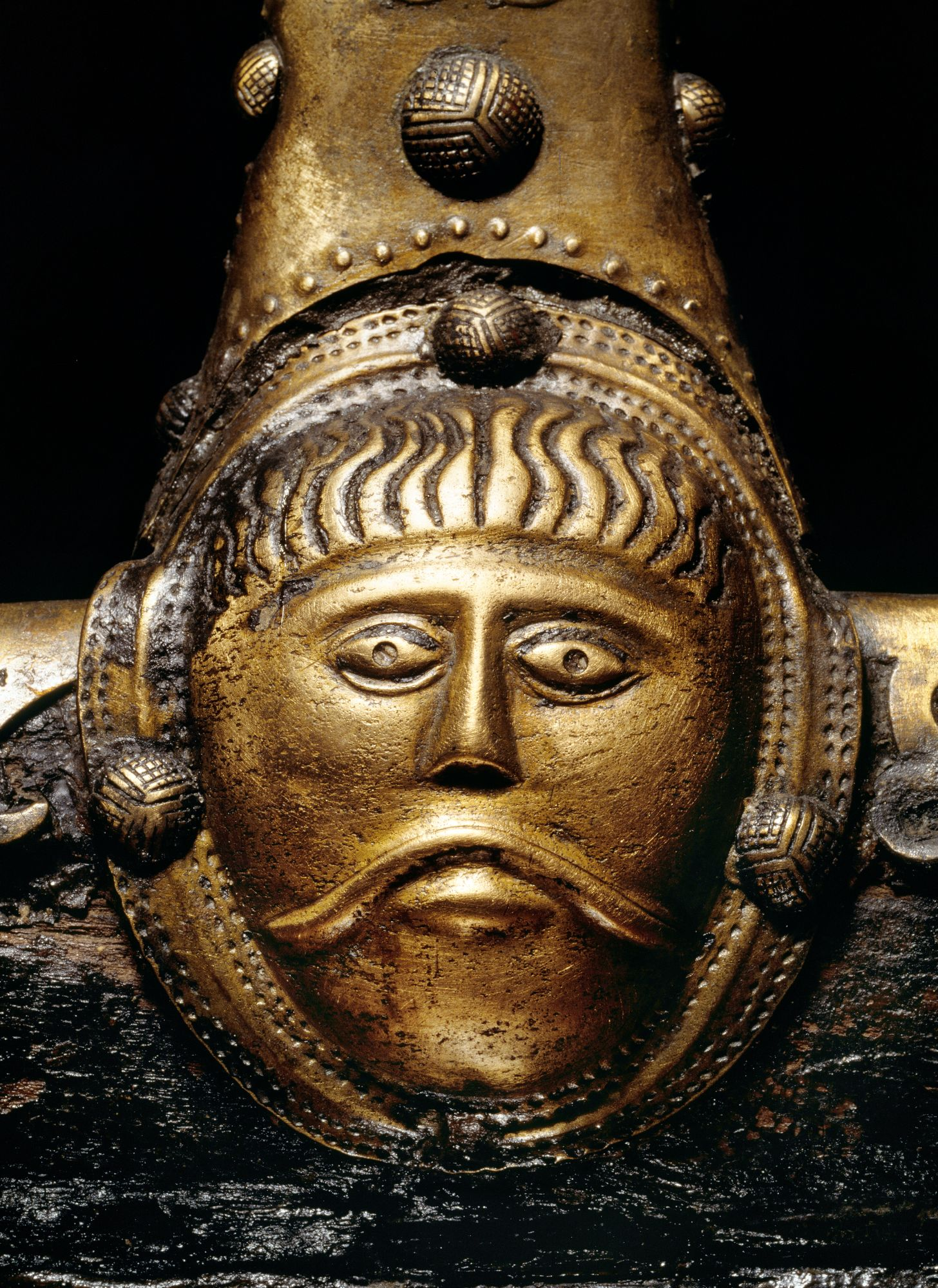

== See also ==
- Germanic paganism
- Nerthus
