= Herthasee (Rügen) =

Lake in Mecklenburg-Vorpommern, Germany

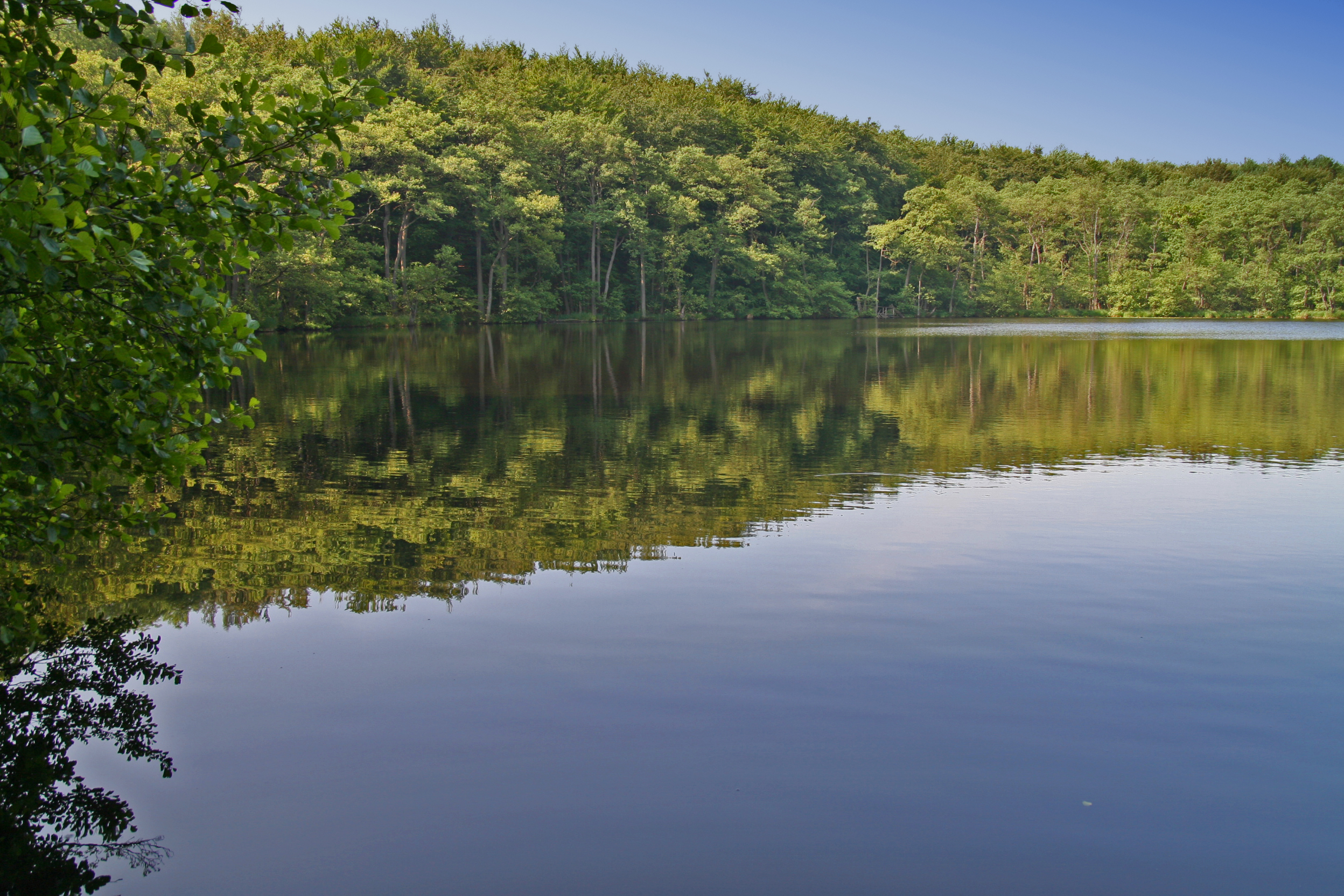

- Location within Mecklenburg-Vorpommern
- Location: Rügen, Mecklenburg-Vorpommern
- Coordinates: 54°34′7″N 13°38′52″E
- Basin countries: Germany
- Max. length: 170 m (560 ft)
- Max. width: 140 m (460 ft)
- Surface area: 0.202 km^{2} (0.078 sq mi)
- Max. depth: 11 m (36 ft)
- Settlements: Sassnitz

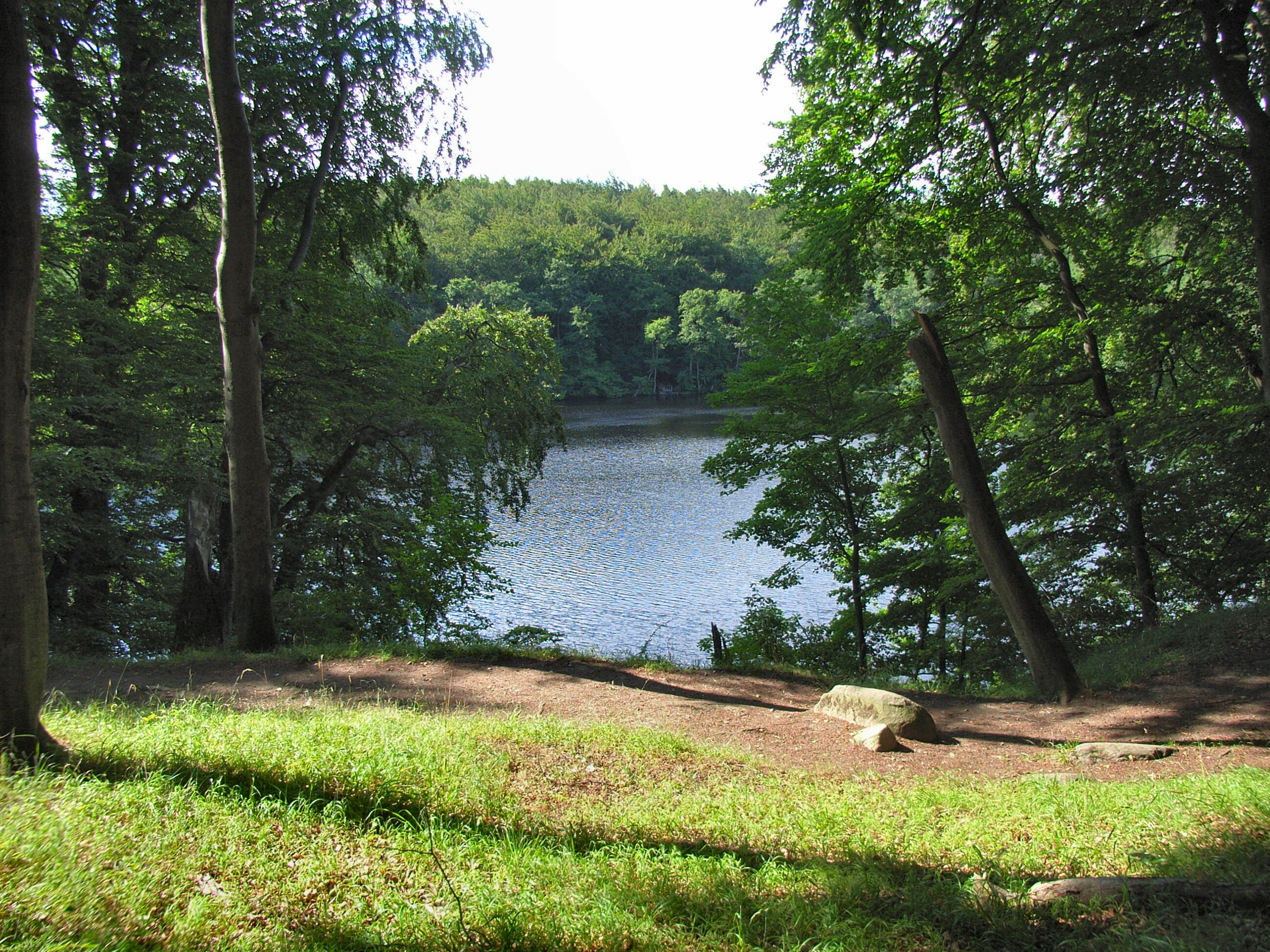
View from the Slavic hill fort Herthaburg towards the lake

Herthasee is a lake on the island Rügen, Mecklenburg-Vorpommern, Germany. At a length of 170 m and a width of 140 m, it covers a surface area of 0.202 km^{2}. It has a maximum depth of 11 m. It is located in the center of the Jasmund National Park and its famous chalk cliffs.

At its embankment, the lake features a Slavic hill fort called Herthaburg, with a height of 17 m. It was constructed and inhabited between the 8th and 12th century.

== Nerthus and Hertha ==
The misreading of the goddess name Nerthus in Tacitus's 1 CE ethnographic work Germania on the ancient Germanic peoples led to the proliferation of the goddess name Hertha from the 16th century to the 19th century, which led to the coining of the hydronym Herthasee. However, developments in historical linguistics led to a widely accepted etymological identification with the North Germanic god Njörðr. The location of the Nerthus lake ritual attested in Germania has subsequently been rejected, with contenders such as the island of Zealand (in modern Denmark) often proposed.
