= 601 Nerthus =

Main-belt asteroid

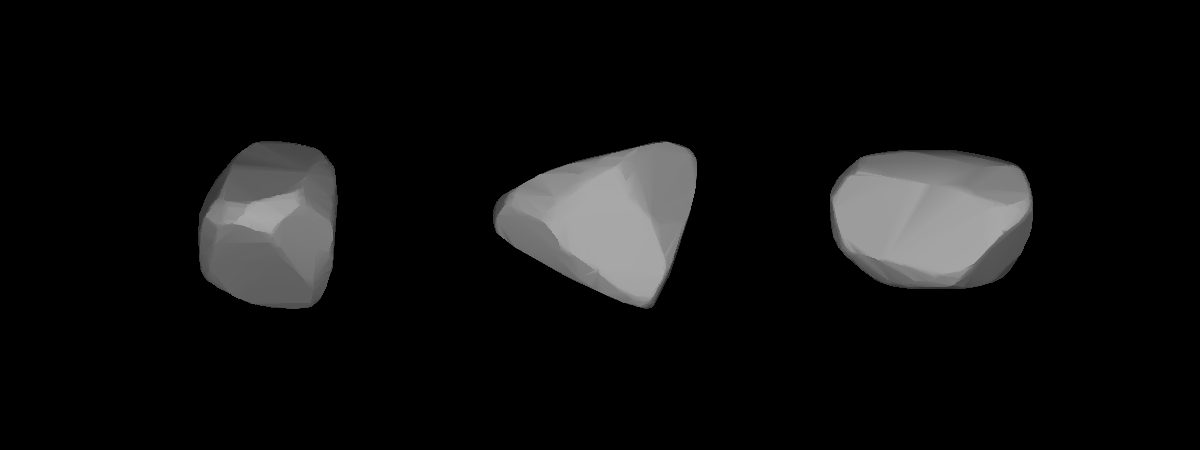
- A three-dimensional model of 601 Nerthus based on its light curve

Discovery
- Discovered by: Max Wolf
- Discovery site: Heidelberg
- Discovery date: 21 June 1906

Designations
- Pronunciation: /ˈnɜːrθəs/
- Alternative designations: 1906 UN

Orbital characteristics
- Epoch 31 July 2016 (JD 2457600.5)
- Uncertainty parameter 0
- Observation arc: 109.82 yr (40111 d)
- Aphelion: 3.4573 AU (517.20 Gm)
- Perihelion: 2.8114 AU (420.58 Gm)
- Semi-major axis: 3.1344 AU (468.90 Gm)
- Eccentricity: 0.10303
- Orbital period (sidereal): 5.55 yr (2026.9 d)
- Mean anomaly: 265.379°
- Mean motion: 0° 10^{m} 39.396^{s} / day
- Inclination: 16.146°
- Longitude of ascending node: 169.575°
- Argument of perihelion: 159.811°

Physical characteristics
- Mean radius: 36.66±1.2 km
- Mass: (3.00±0.90)×10^{17} kg (Note: Calculated from its standard gravitational parameter GM = 0.020±0.006 km^{3}/s^{2}.)
- Mean density: 1.33 g/cm^{3} (Note: Assuming a diameter of 75.5 km.)
- Synodic rotation period: 13.59 h (0.566 d)
- Geometric albedo: 0.0454±0.003
- Absolute magnitude (H): 9.65

601 Nerthus is a minor planet orbiting the Sun. See mythology of Nerthus.
