= Wetlands and islands in Germanic paganism =

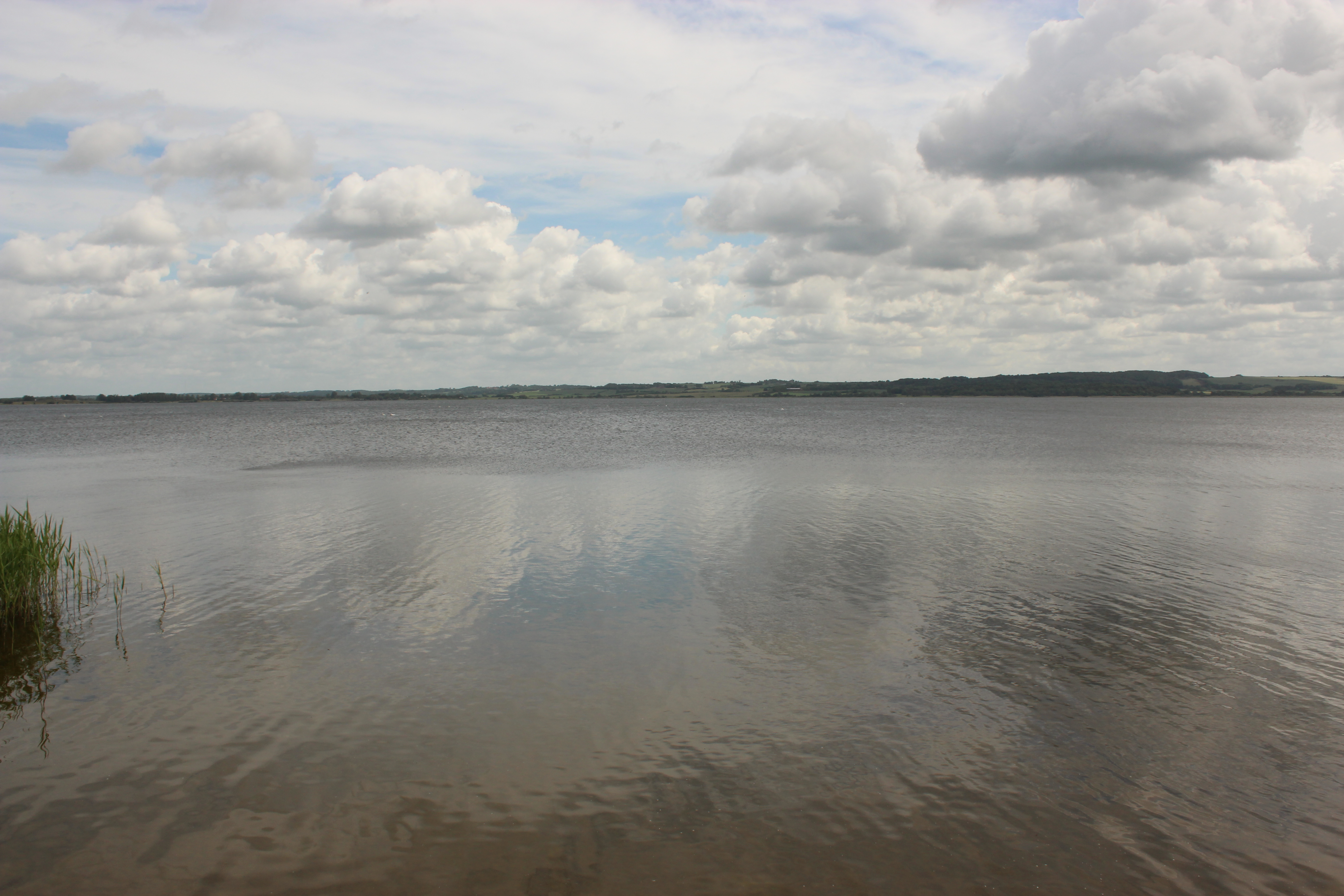
Tissø in Zealand, which was the site of a religious centre in the Viking Age

As in other pagan European cultures, wetlands and islands held a prominent position in Germanic paganism, featuring as sites of religious practice and belief from the Nordic Bronze Age until the Christianisation of the Germanic peoples.

Depositions of items such as food, weapons and riding equipment have been discovered at locations such as rivers, fens and islands varied over time and location. The interpretations of these finds vary with proposed explanations including efforts to thank, placate or ask for help from supernatural beings that were believed to either live in, or be able to be reached through, the wetland. In addition to helpful beings, Old English literary sources record some wetlands were also believed to be inhabited by harmful creatures such as the nicoras and þyrsas fought by the hero Beowulf.

Scholars have argued that during the 5th century CE, the religious importance of watery places was diminished through the actions of the newly forming aristocratic warrior class that promoted a more centralised hall culture. Their cultic role was further reduced upon the introduction of institutionalized Christianity to Germanic-speaking areas when a number of laws were issued that sought to suppress persisting worship at these sites. Despite this, some aspects of heathen religious practice and conceptions seem to have continued after the establishment of Christianity through adaptation and assimilation into the incoming faith such as the persistence of depositions at holy sites.

== History ==
=== Background and origins ===
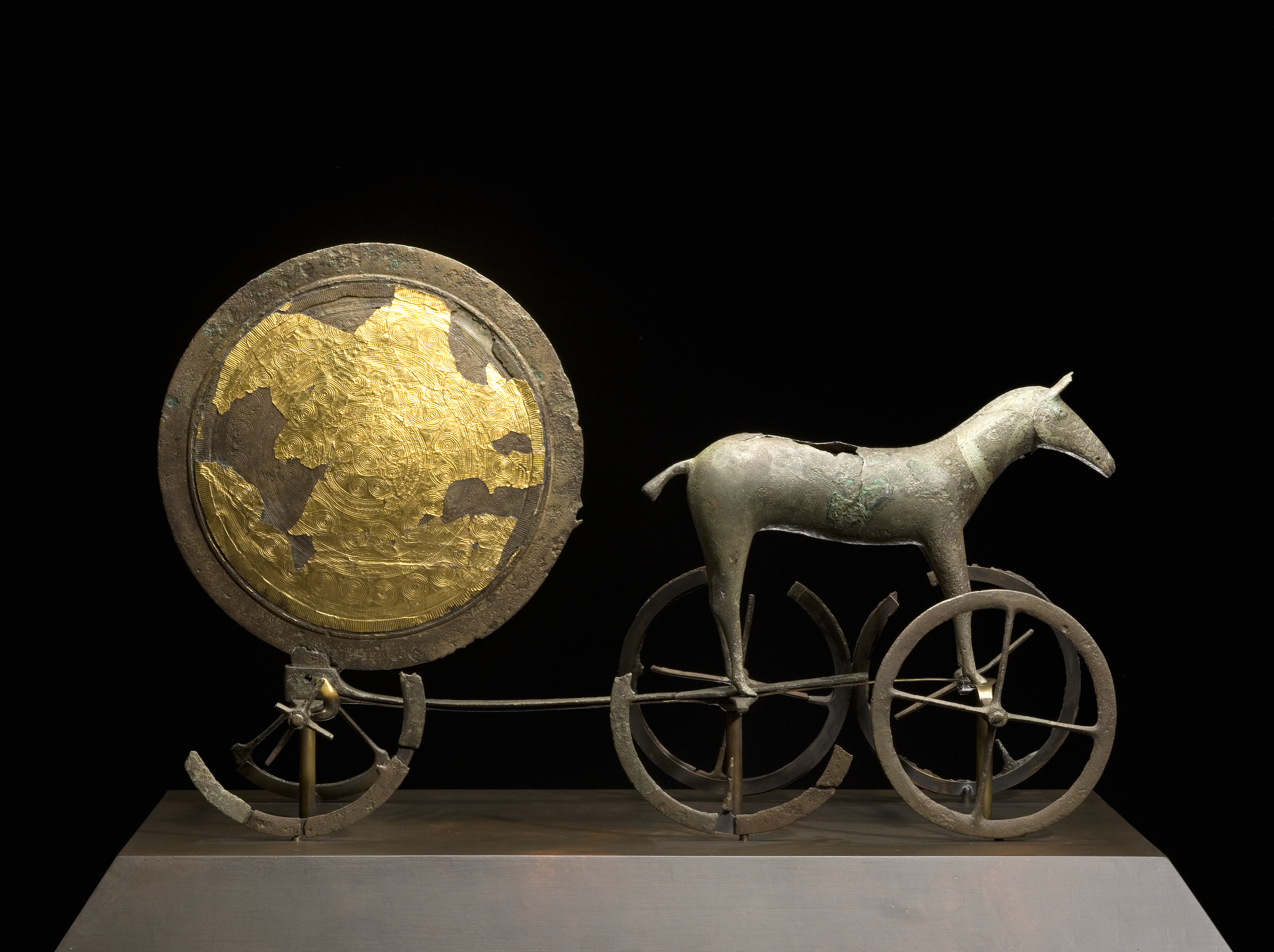
The Trundholm sun chariot, found in the former bog of Trundholm Mose in Zealand, c. 1400 BCE, National Museum of Denmark.

As with elsewhere in Europe, wetland depositions in the areas later inhabited by Germanic peoples, such as England and Scandinavia, were performed in the New Stone Age and continue throughout the Bronze Age (when weapon deposits in Scandinavia begin), Iron Age and into the Viking Age. Throughout this long period there was significant regional and temporal variation with different sites favouring deposition of different types of items at different points in time. Wetlands have further importance to archaeologists as the waterlogged and acidic conditions preserve organic material that would otherwise have degraded such as clothes and wood.

=== Pre-Roman and Roman Iron Age ===
Wetland depositions have been found in continental Germanic areas such as Oberdorla in Thuringia, which was used as a ritual site from the Hallstatt period into at least the Merovingian Period, following trends seen elsewhere of continuity in deposition practice despite migrations or language changes in the area. Large weapon depositions have been found at sites such as Hjortspring, Ådal, Esbøl and Skedemosse, with that at Hjortspring being the oldest of its type, occurring approximately 400 years before depositions began to occur widely throughout Northern Europe. Animal sacrifices in Skedemosse and Hjortspring are approximately contemporary, however, dating to around 300 BCE. It has been theorised that the intensification of deposition in the late Pre-Roman Iron Age at sites like Skedemosse resulted from cultural contact with Celtic peoples who began to spread out over Europe at that time and had similar deposition practices.

Bog bodies typically linked to cultural practices of early Germanic peoples cluster around 600 BCE to 300 CE, and include individuals such as the Tollund man and Osterby Man. Throughout the 1st millennium CE, whole or parts of infants were deposited throughout the Germanic area both in naturally occurring wetlands, such as bogs, and in manmade "wells" (Note: Though referred to by Eriksen as wells, it is noted that they likely would not have been used as wells due to the risk of infection from the deposited bodies of animals and humans.) at settlements such as Trelleborg, which could have been perceived of as "cultivated bogs" that acted like wetlands built at settlements to be tended to by the population. The cause of death of found infants remains unclear. Human depositions have been further linked to an account in Tacitus' Germania of the ritual washing of the god Nerthus, after which those who cleaned her were drowned. He also states that the Germanic peoples drowned individuals that transgressed certain societal rules. Given that bog bodies typically do not show signs of having died by drowning, it has been suggested that these precise details may not be accurate. Despite the number of famous finds, human remains are notably rare in comparison to other types of deposition.

=== Germanic Iron Age ===
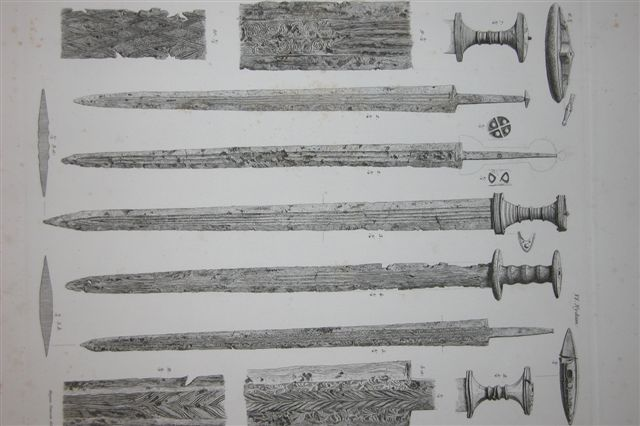
Drawings of weapons found in Nydam Mose, c. 3rd-5th centuries CE

Fibulae and bracteates were also placed either in, or at the edges of, wetlands during the 5th to the first half of the 6th century. Large depositions of weapons cease to occur after the end of the Migration Period, with only small depositions continuing into the Viking Age, and at different sites than before. The gradual reduction of wetland depositions around the 5th century CE has been linked by Terry Gunnell with the centralising of religious traditions and the rise in prominence of halls and the male warrior elite. He further proposes that during this period, female figures associated with bodies of water reduced in prominence and their conception as rulers of realms of the dead was replaced by developing ideas of Valhöll. Similarly, it has been proposed that the stabilisation of the elite class during the 6th century CE led to fewer conflicts, resulting in fewer war spoils being deposited in wetlands.

Wetland deposition of artefacts was practised in Britain prior to the Anglo-Saxon settlement and continued into the Anglo-Saxon period. Finds consist principally of weapons but also include other items such as horse equipment, jewellery and tools. During the Christianisation of Anglo-Saxon England in the 7th century CE, and the subsequent establishment of institutionalised Christianity in the 10th century CE, some wetland practices were made illegal in attempts to suppress them, resulting in wetland depositions continued at a reducing frequency.

This attempt to suppress practices perceived as heathen is paralleled during this period in continental Europe in cases such as the Indiculus superstitionum et paganiarum, that includes well worship in its list of condemned practices deemed pagan or superstitions from around Saxony. Other examples include Langobardic law compiled in 727 CE, that made it a fineable offence to worship at trees and wells, and the Capitulatio de partibus Saxoniae composed in 769 CE, which further forbids worship at wells.

In other cases, the meaning of wetland practices was altered to fit the context of the incoming religion. Specific springs and wells were connected to specific saints and baptisms were sometimes performed in rivers. Furthermore, rivers continued to act as boundaries to liminal places, with monasteries often being built so as to be accessed by crossing rivers. It has been further argued that the conception of wetlands as home to supernatural beings remained widespread, such as in accounts of the Anglo-Saxon saint Guthlac of Crowland such as the Latin Vita sancti Guthlaci and the poems 'Guthlac A & B', in which the saint chooses to live in a fen that is home to evil spirits.

=== Viking Age and later ===
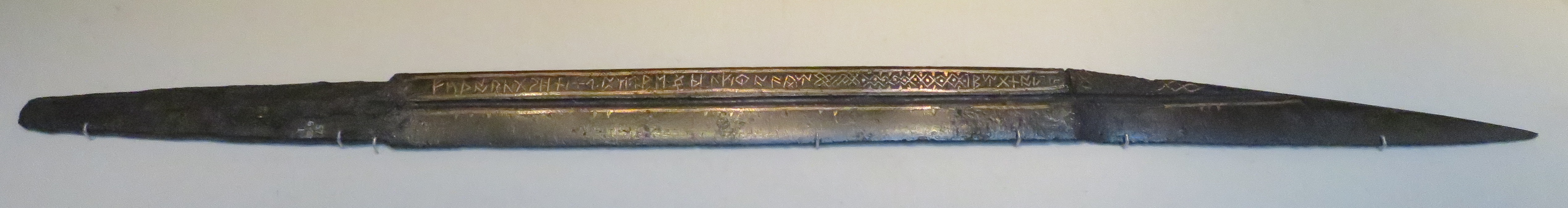
The Anglo-Saxon Seax of Beagnoth, found in the Thames and dating to the 9th-10th century CE

The reduction in depositions seen in Scandinavia during the Germanic Iron Age was not permanent, with depositions of items such as weapons, jewellery, coins and tools resurfacing again during the late 8th century until the beginning of the 11th century CE, when depositions again reduce, coinciding with the increased establishment of Christianity. Weapon depositions in the Viking Age continue the practice seen previously in the Germanic Iron Age with only small numbers of items found and often at different sites than before. These sites include wetlands in regions inhabited by the Viking diaspora, in regions such as Ireland and modern France and the Netherlands. Consistent with this, the Byzantine De Administrando Imperio describes the Rūs Vikings performing sacrifices on St. Gregory's Island in the Dnipro river, which has been linked to finds of Scandinavian swords in the region. Other written accounts include that of the 10th century Andalusian traveller Ibrahim ibn Yaqub that describes those living in Hedeby would throw excess children into the sea. The deposition of weapons in wetlands may be reflected in names of rivers in Nordic mythology such as Geirvimul ("The one bobbing with spears"), Nöt ("The stinging") and Sliðr ("The dangerously sharp"). Of these three rivers, Geirvimul and Nöt run around the sanctuaries or homes of the gods while Sliðr flows through the lands of humans before falling into Hel, and is explicitly described as flowing with swords and seaxes.

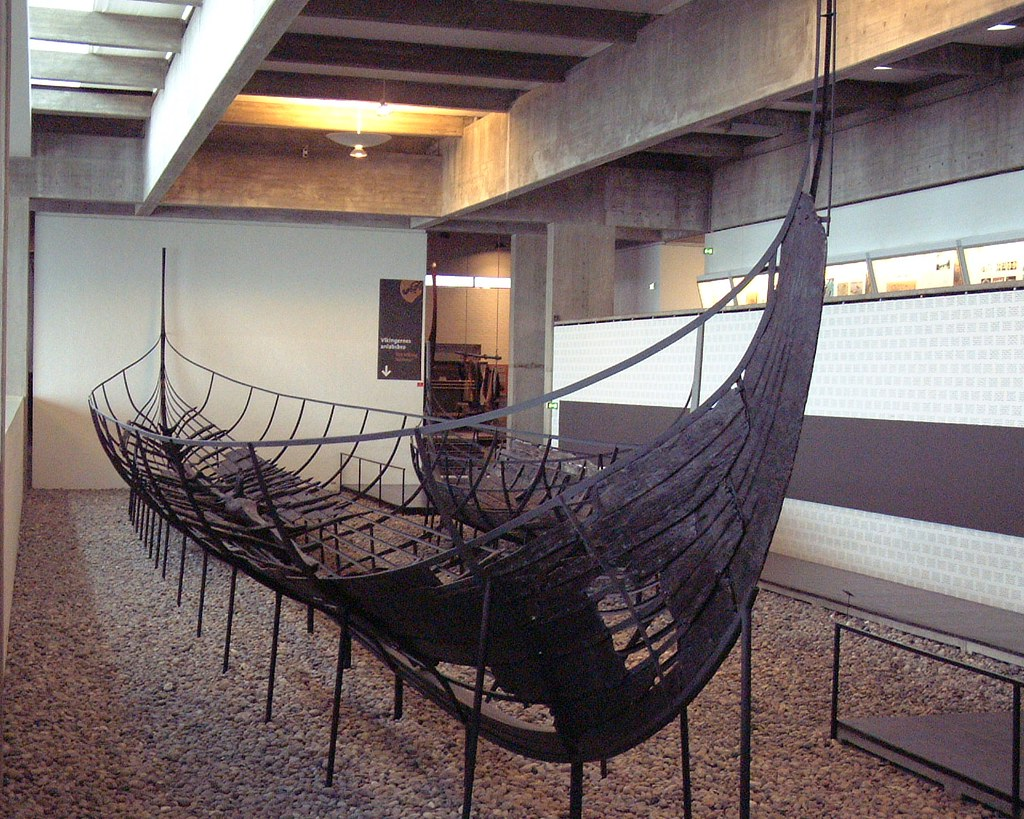
Skuldelev 2, one of a series of ships sunk to block access to the Roskilde fjord

In the case of England, the settlement of North-Germanic peoples coincides with an increase in wetland depositions in the region. Objects pertaining to both Anglo-Saxon and Scandinavian art styles have been found, principally in the Thames, Lea and Witham. Notable finds include the Seax of Beagnoth, the Nene River Ring. In both England and Scandinavia, deposits often cluster around crossing points of rivers such as bridges and fords. Among the sites with the most discovered weapons is the Danish lake Tissø, by which a settlement has been further found that could only be reached in the Viking Age using a 50 m long wooden bridge. At this site are also two deviant burials dated to the 11th-century CE. Depositions have yet to be found, however, at the English lake of analogous name Tyesmere. Due to the close resemblance between depositions at specific landscape features in England and elsewhere, it has been argued that the relatively low number of finds in England result from an under-representation in the archaeological record, be it through lack of discovery or reporting, rather than a lower prevalence of depositional practices. As with those imposed previously, laws issued in England by Cnut the Great between 1020 and 1023 CE forbade the worship of rivers and wells or springs, consistent with the archaeological record of depositions at those wetland sites. It has been suggested that this may be referring to practices in England either by Scandinavians alone, or that the migrations of heathen Scandinavians led to a resurgence of Anglo-Saxon pagan practices.

=== Religious intention ===
While wetland depositions have been interpreted by some scholars as accidental, such as being left behind after battles, the sizes of deposits and the condition of items within them suggest this idea does not explain most finds. Instead, they have typically been interpreted as votive offerings, in contrast to dryland deposits which were viewed as hoards to be uncovered at a later date. Deposition of weapons has further been suggested to be an attempt to prevent the beings in the wetlands from harming those who are trying to cross it, ensuring safe passage.

Many archaeologists have traditionally distinguished between "war-booty sacrifices", consisting of weapons and horse-riding gear, and "fertility sacrifices" consisting of anything else such as agricultural produce, pottery, animal remains and humans. It is typically proposed that weapon deposits are to thank the gods for victory in battle. "Fertility sacrifices" on the other hand are usually seen as part of a reciprocal process of giving. Weapon sacrifices are often believed by scholars to be performed by the victors, thanking the gods by giving them the defeated side's war gear. An alternative suggestion is that it was intended to quell the power of the weapons, which would have been tainted by their association with killing. This division into two distinct classes has been challenged, however, with it being suggested that this strict dichotomy may not correspond well to the conceptions of those making the depositions.

Some adults deposited in bogs have been interpreted as having been executed as a punishment or offered as a sacrifice. Others may have been buried there in a normal fashion. It has been proposed that infant deposition was justified by desperation and only resorted to in extreme cases. Consistent with this, the majority of infant depositions date to the Migration Period - a time of widespread strife and population movements. On the contrary, it has also been argued that infanticide was socially acceptable due to factors such as the high infant mortality rate, not seeing children as full humans until they reached certain milestones like first breastfeeding and it being safer to the mother than abortions. Similarities have been noted between the contemporary practices of infant deposition in wetlands and those in spaces in settlements, such as in postholes and beneath hearths, which were more common. It has been suggested that in the animist mindset of Germanic pagans in the 1st millennium CE, in which the boundaries between some objects and living beings was blurred, that in certain contexts human bodies and infants may have been conceived of as animate objects that could be used as ritual tools, either intact or in pieces. It has also been suggested that placing bodies in bogs was a way of preventing them from returning as beings such as draugs.

Notable outliers to these reasonings include the Skuldelev ships, which were intentionally scuttled for defensive purposes, blocking the entrance to Roskilde fjord, rather than serving a religious function.

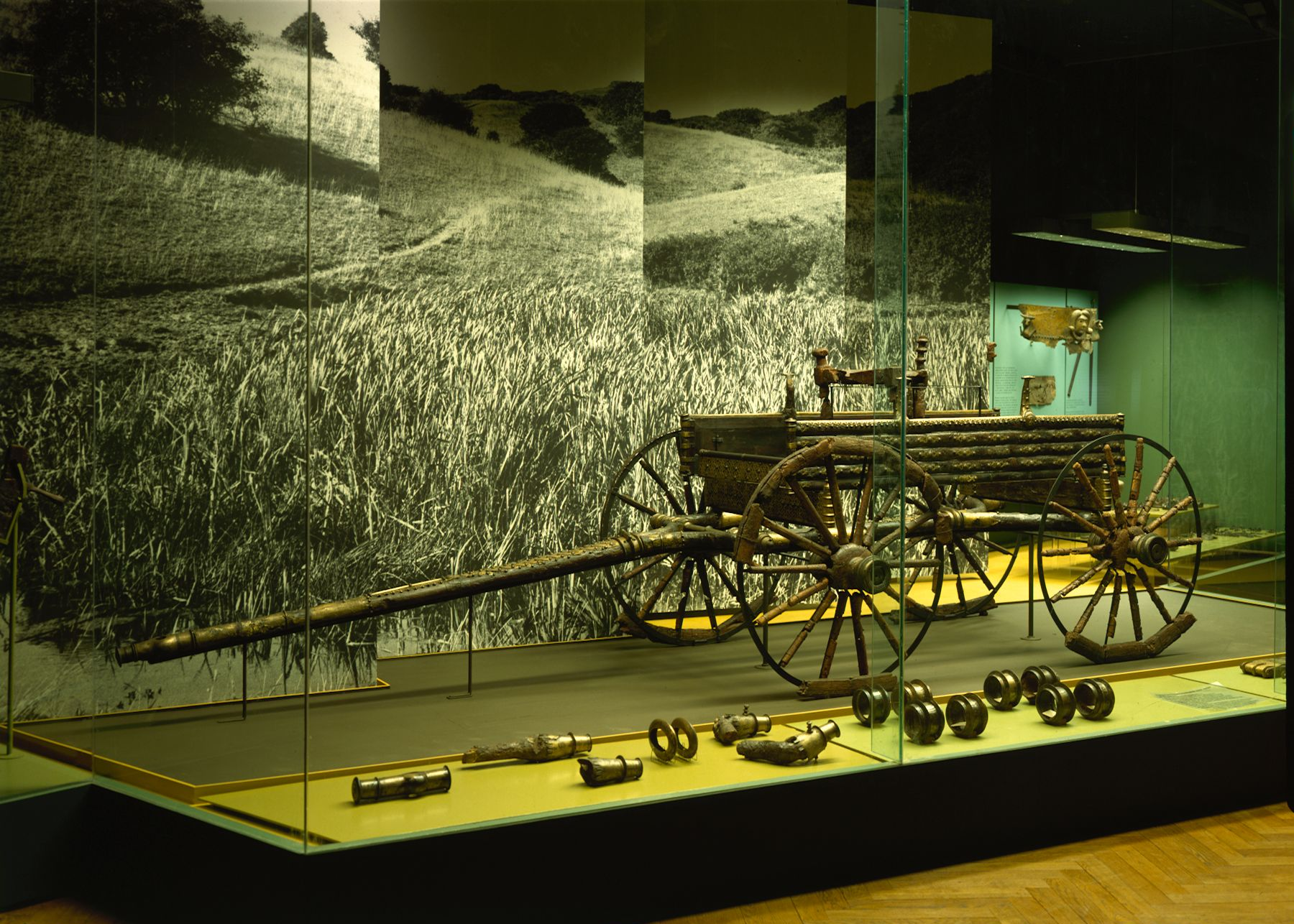
The Dejbjerg wagon, c. 200-100 BCE, National Museum of Denmark

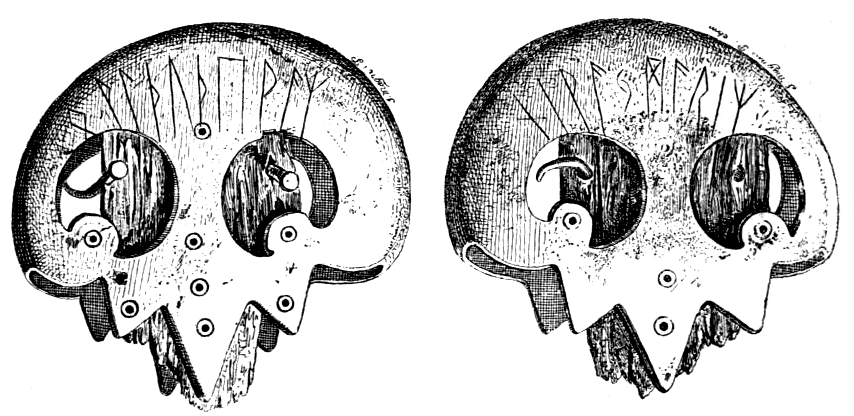
Drawing of the Thorsberg chape, c. 200 CE

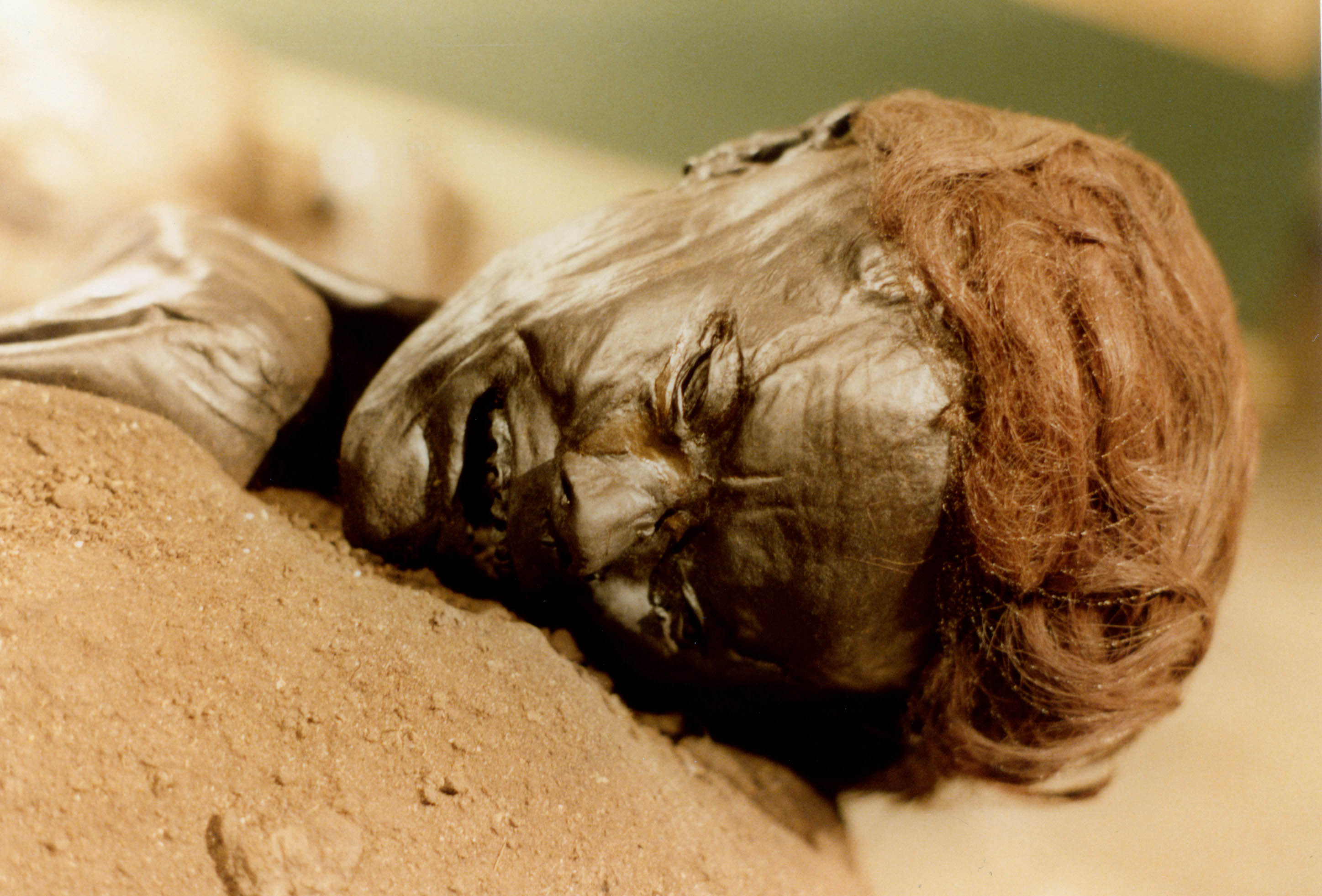
Grauballe Man, c. 290 CE, Moesgaard Museum

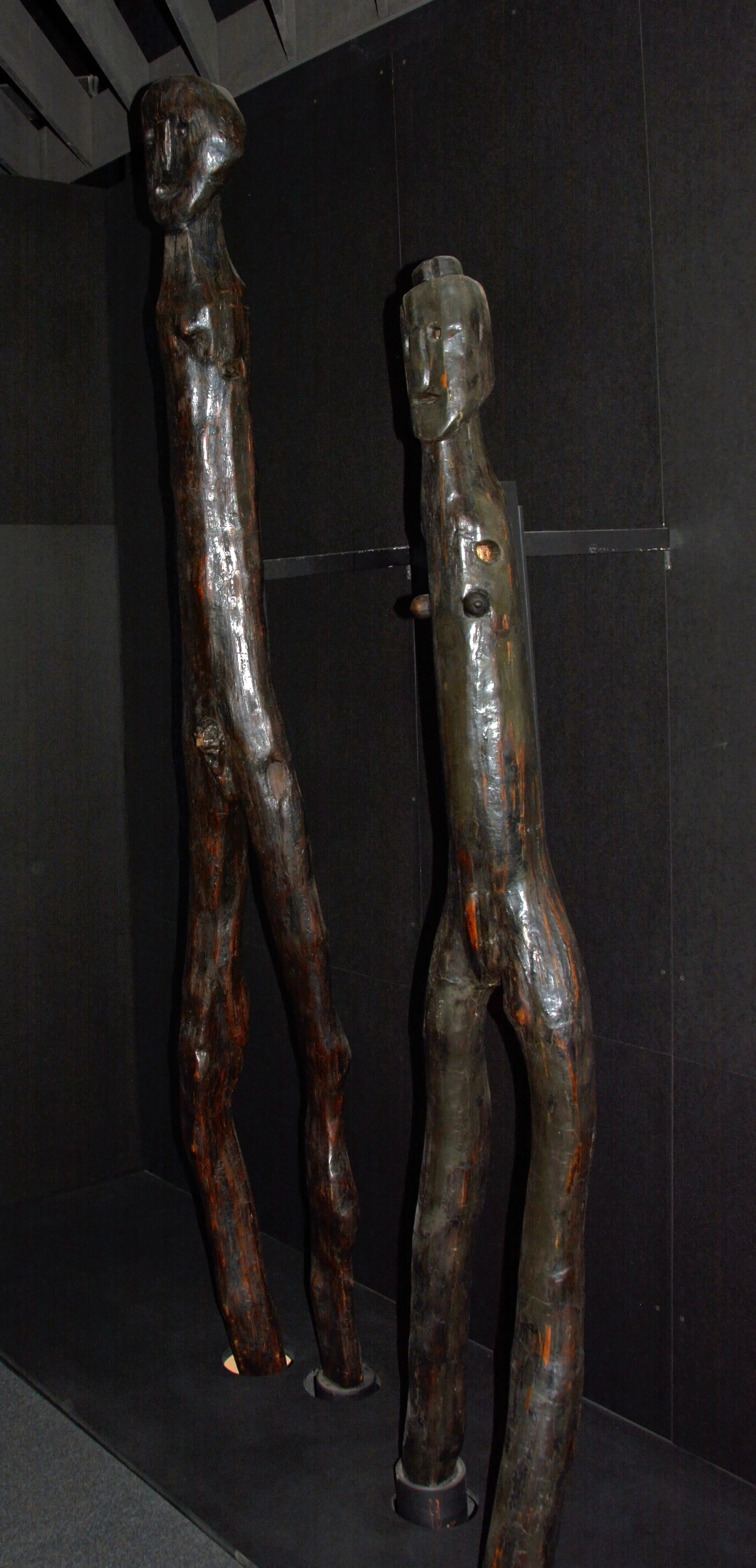
Braak Bog Figures, c. 2nd-4th centuries BCE, Schleswig-Holstein state archaeology museum at Gottorf Castle

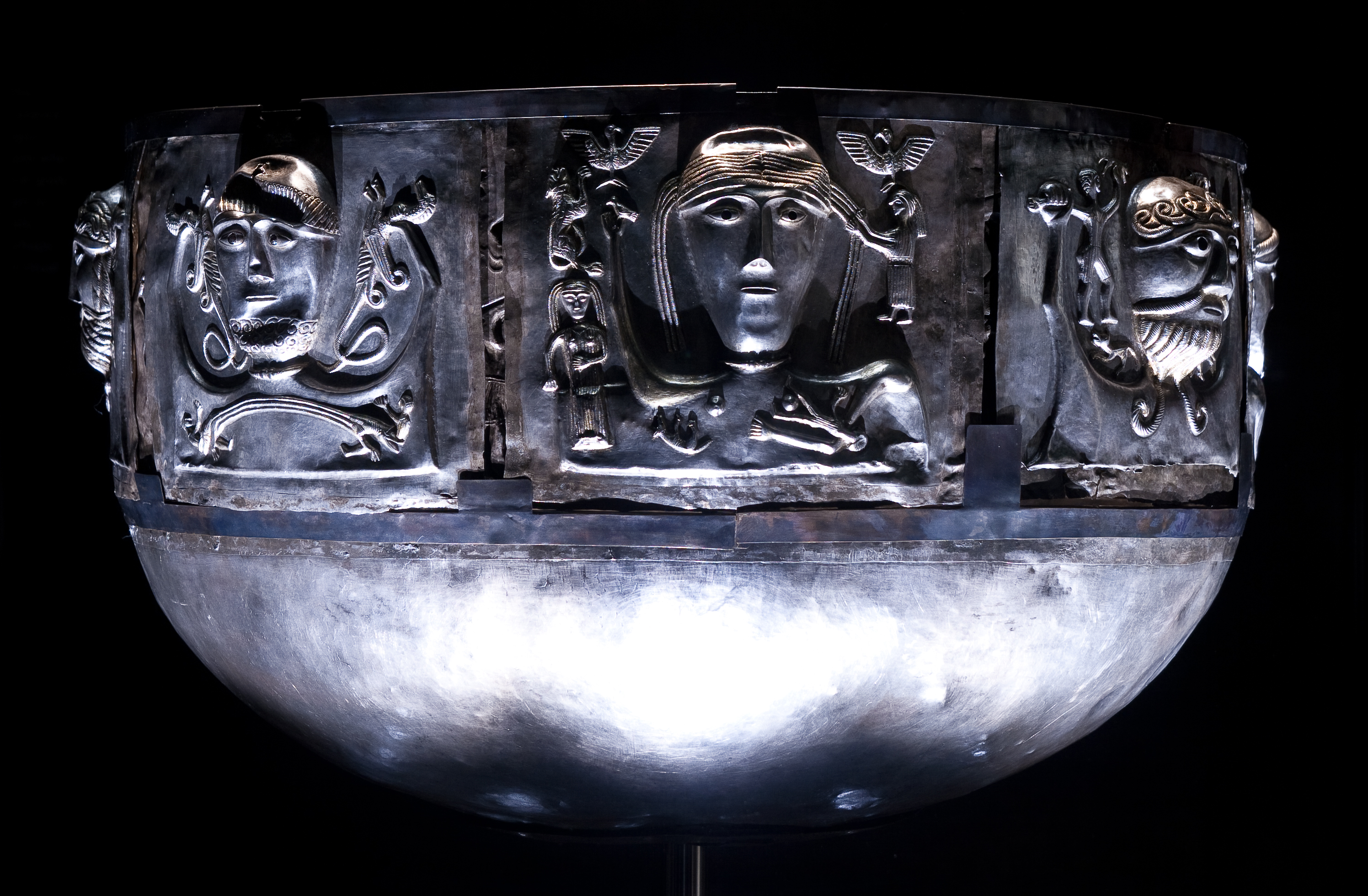
Gundestrup cauldron, c. 200 BCE-300 CE, National Museum of Denmark

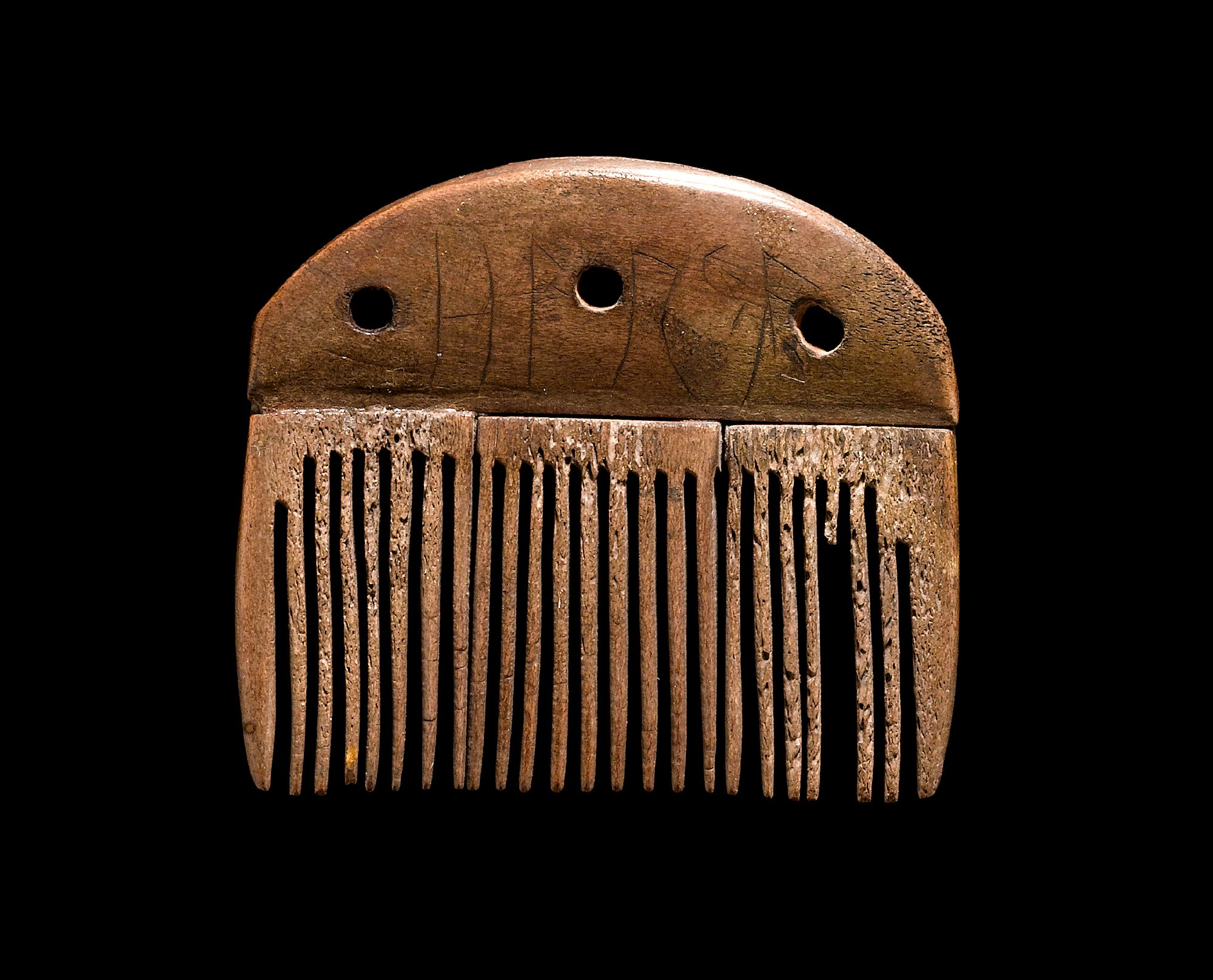
Vimose Comb, c. 160 CE, National Museum of Denmark

== Inhabitation by supernatural beings ==
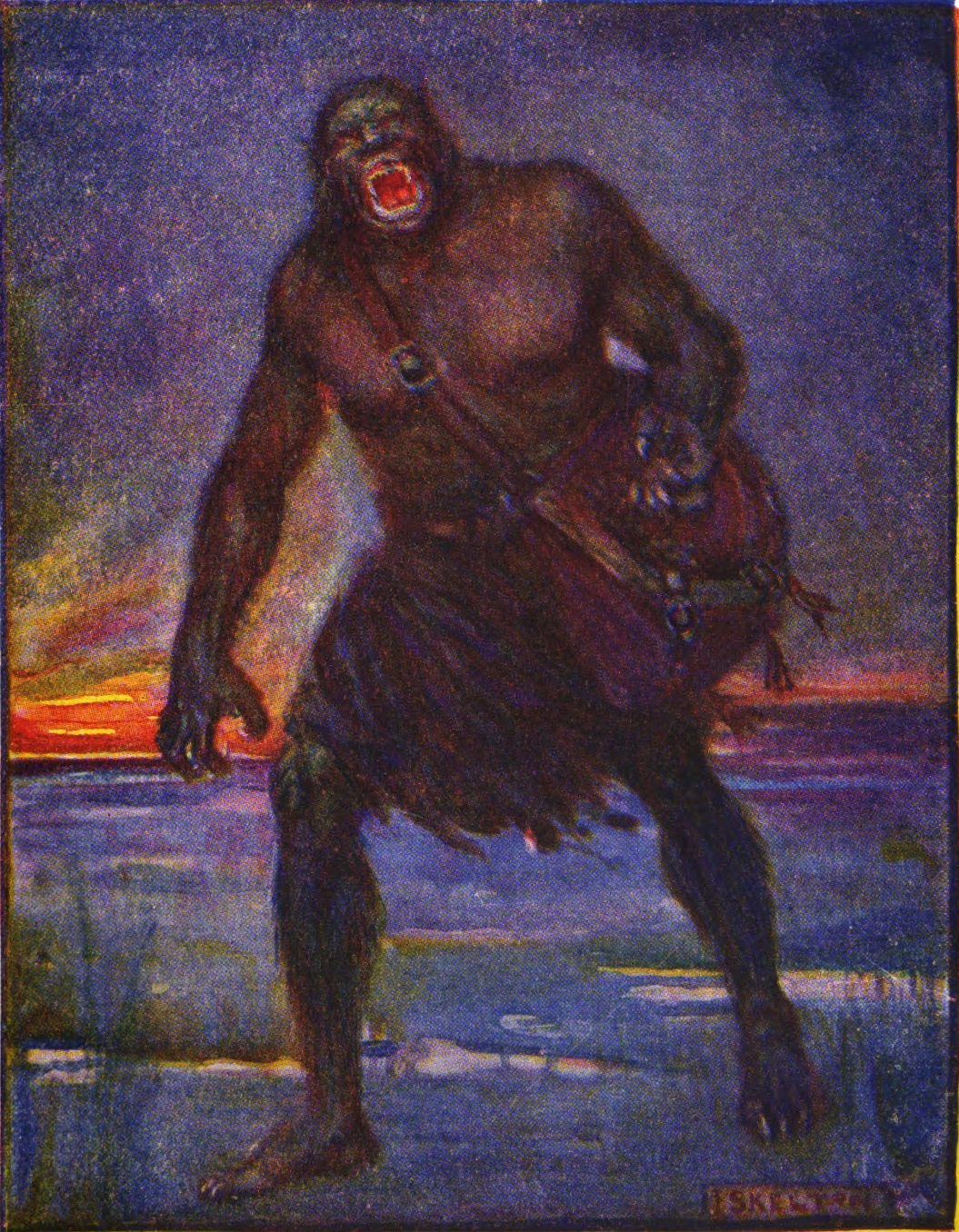
The fen-dwelling Grendel, as depicted by J. R. Skelton in the 1908 Stories of Beowulf

Accounts such as Grímnismál describe lakes and bogs as the dwellings of female gods. Frigg lives in Fensalir ("Fen halls") and Sága lives in Sökkvabekkr ("Sunken benches") where she drinks with Odin beneath the waves. Supernatural beings are also described as residing at watery sites described as brunnar (translated variously as "lakes", "wells" and "ponds"). These include Urðarbrunnr (where three norns live and the gods meet to give judgement) and Mímisbrunnr (associated with the wise being Mímir).

Gods and other supernatural beings are also described as living across bodies of water on islands. The beginning of Grímnismál describes two brothers get lost while fishing and are stranded, whereupon they are taken care of by Odin and Frigg in disguise. Gods could also be seen as being situated in specific geographical locations such as Ægir on læsø and Nerthus in a holy grove on an island in sea. In Gautreks saga, Starkaðr meets Odin among other gods on an island near Hordaland, while in Jómsvíkinga saga, Earl Hákon goes to an island to blót to Þorgerðr Hölgabrúðr and Irpa.

Overtly harmful beings are also described as living in wetlands in Old English accounts. In Beowulf, the eponymous hero kills nine beasts in the sea during his swimming competition with Brecca the Bronding. He later journeys into a lake in the marshes in which Grendel's mother lives in order to fight her, where he finds her living in a hall beneath the water. Consistent with this, fens are described in Maxims II as the characteristic dwelling place of a þyrs, a type of being that includes Grendel. Nicors also feature in the poem, where they live beneath the surface of pools and are presented as terrifying and dangerous creatures. Similarly, the name of Fenrir, the wolf prophesied in Völuspá to eat Odin at Ragnarök, likely translates as "Fen-dweller".

== Toponomy ==
Germanic placenames associated with water that have been proposed to derive from their historical role in pagan religious practice:

=== Crossing points ===
England

- Weeford (Wēoh ford), village in Staffordshire
- Wyfordby (Wēoh ford settlement), village in Leicestershire

=== Islands ===
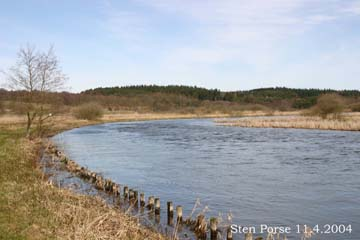
Gudenå in Jutland

Norway

- Goðeyjar (Islands of the gods), islands in Salten
- Helgøya (The holy island), island in Lake Mjøsa

Sweden

- Helgö (Holy island), Island in Mälaren
- Frösön (The island dedicated to the god Freyr), island in Jämtland.

=== Wetlands ===
Denmark

- Gudenå (Gods' stream), river in Jutland
- Tissø (Týr's or god's lake), lake in Zealand

England

- Tyesmere (Tīw's mere), lake in Worcestershire

Sweden

- Odensjö (Odin's lake), lake in Scania

== Significance of watery places ==
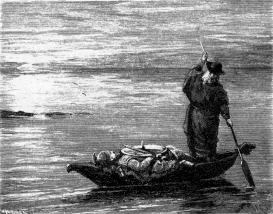
Odin with Sinfjötli's corpse. An illustration from Fredrik Sander's 1893 Swedish edition of the Poetic Edda.

=== Water as marking liminal spaces ===
Wetlands, intertidal regions and seasonal and tidal islands have been interpreted as being conceptionally distinct in the cognitive landscapes of many past cultures. Similarly, watercourses, islands and bridges have often served as markers of territories, natural barriers, crossing points and facilitators of travel. It has been proposed that these qualities led early Germanic people to see them as liminal spaces in which supernatural encounters were more likely. Water also often is described as separating the lands of the living from both those of the dead and of the gods, such as Gjǫll which is mentioned in Gylfaginning as marking the border to Hel.

The conception of lands of the dead being separated from those of the living frequently recurs across the world and is attested throughout Northwestern Europe from the 6th century CE onwards. The Byzantine historian Procopius describes that the people of the Low Countries ferry the souls of the dead to an island off the coast. Similarly in Beowulf and the Prose Edda, the bodies of Scyld Scefing and Baldr are laid on ships and sent out to sea. In the latter case, the ship is burnt and the god is later found in Hel. Similarly, in the prose section of Frá dauða Sinfjǫtla, a boatman identified by some scholars as Odin ferries the body of Sinfjǫtli across a fjord. These textual sources have been connected with wider evidence such as archaeological finds of ship burials that occur in Northern Europe from the Iron Age, likely reflecting the idea that those who had died could reach the land of the dead by boat. Similarly, many Iron Age graves have been found on uninhabited islands, and many Iron Age and Viking Age grave fields are separated from settlements by streams. Furthermore, some mounds, such as those at Borre in Vestfold, have ditches around them that would have filled up with water at certain times of year, making them transient islands that could be reached by bridges that were built over the ditches.

It has been suggested that bodies of water such as Odensjo were conceived of as passages to the otherworld where gods and other beings resided, similar to beliefs associated with saajve in south Saami tradition. Comparable beliefs have been noted in later Northern European folklore such as people reaching the land of the elves by jumping into ponds, rivers or the sea in Icelandic folklore.

=== Reflection of mythical locations in religious sites ===
Mímisbrunnr has been connected to the waters of Mimling in Germany, and Mimesøa and Mimesjöen in Sweden. It has been argued that these names suggest that, like Mímisbrunnr, there was a belief in a wise prophetic being living beneath these waters.

Adam of Bremen describes in Gesta Hammaburgensis ecclesiae pontificum that at the temple at Uppsala, heathen sacrifices were made at the site of a tree and a spring or well (fons). Similarities have been noted between this site and Yggdrasil and the wells ("brunnar") that stand beneath its roots. It has been noted that the combination of trees and wells is common at pagan religious sites in accounts from the 6th century CE to the time of Charlemagne.

=== Relationship with other practices ===
It has been argued that the use of watery places should be seen in the context of the wider holy landscapes in the minds of the Germanic peoples that also included other important features involved in religious practice such as burial mounds, temples, hills, fields and groves.

== See also ==
- Water and religion
