= Lýtir =

Norse god

Lytir (Old Norse Lýtir) is considered a god in Norse mythology and Norse paganism. His name is either related to the Old Norse word hlutr, meaning "lot, share, foretell" or lýti meaning blemish. If the former meaning is assumed, then priests of Lytir would probably have been spámaðr or fortune-tellers. Supporting this etymology is a story about Lytir in Hauks þáttr hábrókar (in the Flateyjarbók) during which a Swedish king consults the god. Lytir's ceremonial wagon was taken to a sacred place where the god entered it and then taken back to the king's hall, where it was used to answer questions. He may be identical to Lóðurr, one of the three gods creating the two first humans Ask and Embla. Contrary to this, Anatoly Liberman rejects the identity of Lýtir and Lóðurr and returns to the old idea that Lýtir was a cognomen of Freyr, who may have been known in Sweden as Freyr Lýtir. If Old Icelandic litr meant 'penis', Lýtir ~ Litr would have been an apt cognomen of a phallic deity, more appropriate than 'shining,' 'diviner,' or any other suggested in the past.
