= Terry Gunnell =

British-Icelandic folklorist, academic and author

Terry Adrian Gunnell (born 7 Juli 1955) is a British-Icelandic folklorist, academic and author. He is a professor of folklore at the University of Iceland, where he has played a central role in education and research in the fields of Nordic religion, folklore studies and the history of ritual.

== Education and academic career ==
Gunnell earned a bachelor's degree (B.A). in drama and English, followed by a Ph.D. in folklore studies (1992) at the University of Leeds. His doctoral dissertation formed the basis for his seminal work The Origins of Drama in Scandinavia (1995).

He has been affiliated with the University of Iceland since the 1990s. He was appointed professor of folklore studies at the Isak Jonsson Institute for Icelandic Literature and Culture. In addition to his research and teaching, he has supervised a large number of master's and PhD students in the fields of Old Norse religion and folk belief. He has also served as a consultant on historical film productions including Robert Eggers' The Northman (2022).

== Areas of research and appointments ==
Gunnell's field of research spans Norse mythology, pre-Christian rituals, folk belief, legends, and the transition from paganism to Christianity in the Nordic region. His publications and academic work focus on the following areas:

- The origins of drama and performance culture: Investigations into how early Nordic and Germanic cultures utilized masks, spectacles, and ritual performance (discussed in, for example, The Origins of Drama in Scandinavia).
- Legends and landscape: Studies of Icelandic folklore, including the relationship between nature, place names, and oral tradition (notably as editor of Legends and Landscape: Articles on Icelandic Legends, 2008).
- Death and transition rituals: Research into North Atlantic beliefs regarding the undead, the realm of the dead and folk magic.

Gunnell has also held various international appointments, including president of the international folklore network *The Folklore Fellows* and as board member of various scholarly associations in the fields of folklore and oral tradition.

== Selected bibliography ==
- The Origins of Drama in Scandinavia (Boydell & Brewer, 1995)
- Legends and Landscape: Articles on Icelandic Legends (red., University of Iceland Press, 2008)
- Numerous peer-reviewed articles and book contributions on Nordic religion, folk beliefs, and Scandinavian mythology.
