= Anders Andrén =

Swedish archaeologist

Anders Andrén (born 1952) is professor of archaeology at the Stockholm University. He was the holder of the Dalrymple lectureship in archaeology at the University of Glasgow in 2003 and is a member of the boards of the Danish Graduate School in Archaeology and the Nordic Graduate School in Archaeology. Andrén has held multiple fellowships (2009–10, Spring 2013, Fall 2013) at the Swedish Collegium for Advanced Study in Uppsala, Sweden.

== Selected publications ==
- "Behind Heathendom: Archaeological Studies of Old Norse Religion", Scottish Archaeological Journal, Vol. 27 (2007), No 2, pp. 105–138.
- Det medeltida Gotland: En arkeologisk guidebok (Ed.) (2011)
- "Places, Monuments, and Objects The Past in Ancient Scandinavia", Scandinavian Studies, Vol. 85 (2013), No. 3, pp. 267–281.
- "The significance of places: the Christianization of Scandinavia from a spatial point of view", World Archaeology, Vol. 45 (2013), No 1, pp. 27–45.
- Tracing Old Norse Cosmology: The world tree, middle earth, and the sun in archaeological perspectives (Ed.) (2014)
- "Religious Transformations in the Middle Ages: Towards a New Archaeological Agenda", Medieval Archaeology, Vol. 61 (2017), No. 2, pp. 300–329.
