= Gullveig =

Norse mythical character

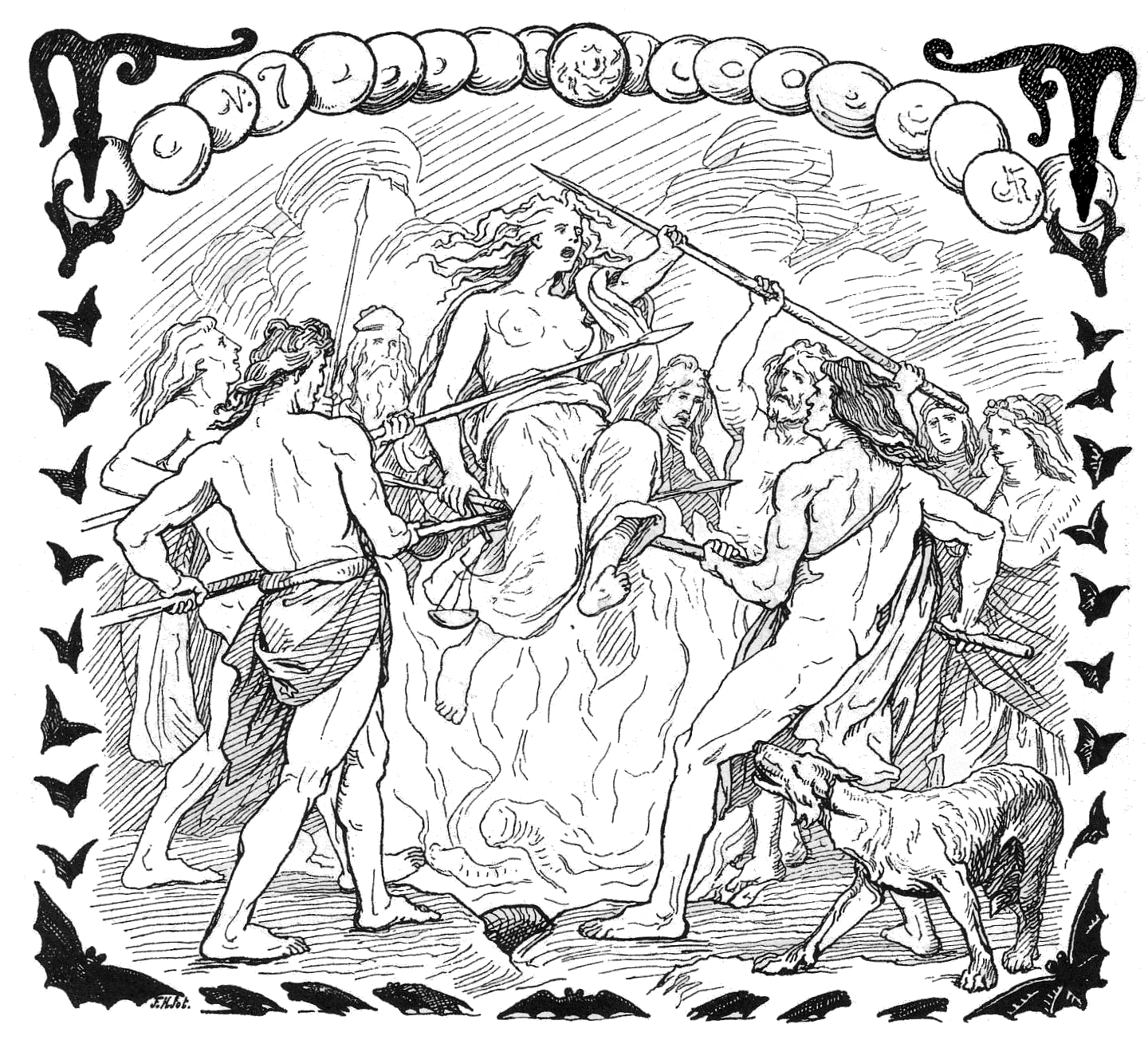
The Æsir lift Gullveig on spears over fire as illustrated by Lorenz Frølich (1895)

In Norse mythology, Gullveig (Old Norse: [ˈɡulːˌwɛiɣ]) is a goddess associated with gold, lust, rebirth, and magic. She is one member of the Vanir and the cause of the outbreak of the legendary war between the Æsir and the Vanir. In the poem Völuspá, she came to the hall of Odin (Hár) where she is speared by the Æsir three times, burned three times, and yet is reborn three times. After her third rebirth, she adopted the name Heiðr and began practicing seiðr.

Gullveig/Heiðr is solely attested in the Poetic Edda, compiled in the 13th century from earlier traditional material. Scholars have variously proposed that Gullveig/Heiðr is the same figure as the goddess Freyja, that Gullveig's death may have been connected to corruption by way of gold among the Æsir, and/or that Gullveig's treatment by the Æsir may have led to the Æsir–Vanir War.

== Etymology ==
The etymology of the Old Norse name Gullveig remains uncertain. It is a compound formed with the Old Norse word for 'gold' (gull), yet the second element–found in other personal names like Rannveig, Sölveig, or Thórveig–remains obscure. It could have meant 'power, strength' (cf. Icelandic veig, Faroese veiggj), 'intoxicating drink' (cf. Norwegian veigja), possibly 'lady' (cf. Norw. veiga) or even 'gold, gold thread' (cf. Old English wāg, Old Saxon wēg). The name has been variously translated as 'Gold-drink', 'Gold-drunk', or as 'Gold-draught'. Gullveig is sometimes held to be a personification of gold itself, purified through repeated smelting.

The name Heiðr, which in adjectival form means 'bright, clear', is semantically related. Scholar Rudolf Simek comments that although Gullveig's name changes to Heiðr, the meaning still remains basically the same.

== Attestations ==
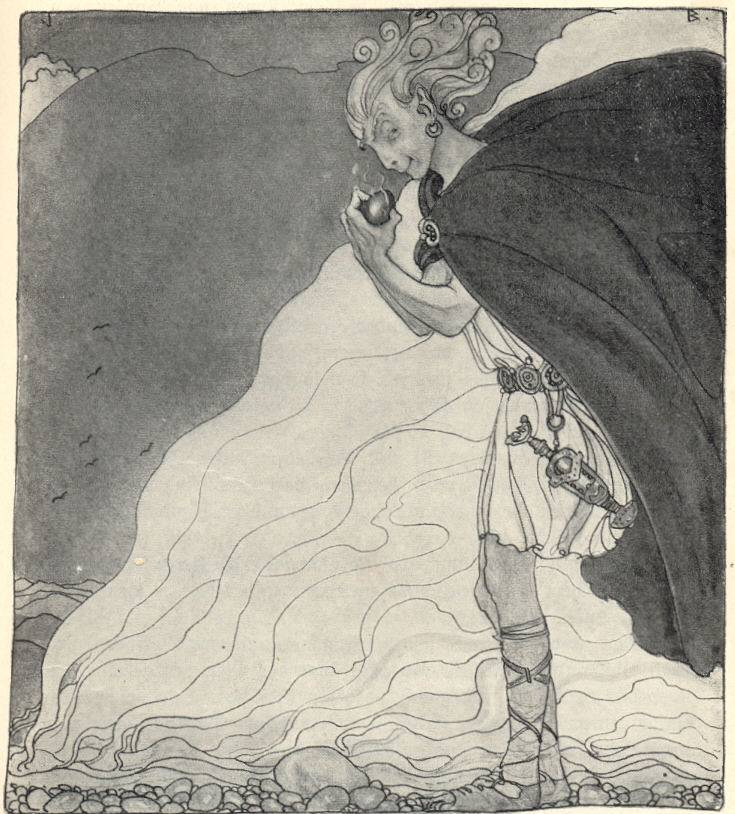
Loki finds Gullveig's heart from Our Father's Godsaga. Art by John Bauer (1911)

Gullveig is solely attested in a stanza of Völuspá (Prophecy of the Völva) immediately preceding the story of the Æsir–Vanir War. A völva (seeress) recalls that Gullveig was pierced by spears before being burnt three times in the hall of Hárr (one of Odin's names), and yet was three times reborn. Presumably after her burning, Gullveig became known as Heiðr, a knowledgeable völva who could perform great feats:

H. A. Bellows translation (1923):

The war I remember, the first in the world,
When the gods with spears had smitten Gollveig,
And in the hall of Hor had burned her,
Three times burned, and three times born,
Oft and again, yet ever she lives.
Heith they named her who sought their home
The wide-seeing witch, in magic wise;
Minds she bewitched that were moved by her magic,
To evil women a joy she was.

A. Orchard translation (1997):

Then [the sibyl] remembered the first great war in the world,

when they stabbed at Gullveig with spears,

and they burned her in Odin ’s hall;

thrice they burned the thrice-bom girl,

often, not once, but still she lived.

They called her heid, when she came to the house,

a sibylline witch, who knew the skill of wands,

she practised seid where she could, practised seid in a trance;

she was always a delight to wicked women.

J. Lindow translation (2001):

She remembers the war of peoples first in the world,

When Gullveig with spears they studded

And in Hár’s hall burned her;

Thrice burned, thrice born,

Often, unseldom, though she yet lives.

Heid they called her, wherever she came to houses,

A seeress skilled in prophecy, she observed magic staffs;

She performed seid, wherever she could, she performed seid in a trance,

She was ever the joy of an evil woman.

== Theories ==
Starting with scholar Gabriel Turville-Petre, many scholars such as Rudolf Simek and John Lindow have theorized that Gullveig/Heiðr is the same figure as Freyja. Lindow notes that "since Ynglinga saga says that Freyja first brought seid to the æsir, it is not impossible that Gullveig is Freyja, and that she brought seid to the æsir in the first instance either as a strategy in the war, or that her bringing of seid started the war." Orchard further mentions that Freyja, like Gullveig, is associated with gold and with the form of magic known as seid.

== See also ==
- List of names of Freyja, a list of various names attributed to the goddess Freyja
