= Heiðr =

Norse mythological character

Heiðr (also rendered Heid, Hed, Heith, Hetha etc., from the Old Norse adjective meaning "bright" or the noun meaning "honour") is a Norse female personal name. Several individuals by the name appear in Norse mythology and history.

== A seeress ==
A seeress and witch (völva) named Heiðr is mentioned in one stanza of Völuspá, related to the story of the Æsir-Vanir war:

Heith they named her
who sought their home,
The wide-seeing witch,
in magic wise;
Minds she bewitched
that were moved by her magic,
To evil women
a joy she was.

—Völuspá (22), Bellows' translation

The general assumption is that here, "Heiðr" is an alternate name for the witch Gullveig, mentioned in the previous stanza, who, in turn, is often thought to be a hypostasis of Freyja. But it is sometimes argued that the völva who recites the poem refers to herself.

Heiðr is also a seeress in several works such as Landnámabók (S 179 / H 45), Hrólfs saga kraka (3) and Örvar-Odds saga (2), where she predicts Örvar's death.

== A jotun ==
Heiðr is also the name of a child of the giant Hrímnir, according to Völuspá hin skamma (Hyndluljóð, 32).

== A shield maiden ==
A shield-maiden bearing this name (spelled Heiðr in Sögubrot af nokkrum fornkonungum, Hetha in Gesta Danorum, Hethae in Chronicon Lethrense) was a captain of the Danes, serving in the army of Harald Wartooth at the Battle of Brávellir. She fought alongside another shield-maiden named Visma (according to Sögubrot; Wisna in GD, Wysna in CL).

The earliest of these is probably Chronicon Lethrense, which tells the tale briefly. In this version, Hethae and Wysna were girls ("puelle") who fought for Harald Wartooth and carried his war banners. After the Danes were defeated and Harald killed, the Danes made Hethae their king ("regem") with the permission of their conqueror Ring, king of Swethia (i.e., Sweden). Hethae founded the city of Hedeby ("Hethæby"), which was named after her. After this, the chronicle ends.

Book 8 of Gesta Danorum, by Saxo Grammaticus, tells the tale in more detail. In this version, Hetha and Wisna come from the town of Sle, along with Haco Cut-Cheek. They are described as having feminine bodies ("muliebri corpori") but the souls of men ("virilem animum"). Wisna was guarded by a band of Sclavs, whereas Hetha was guarded by her armed retinue, led by the chiefs Grim and Grenzli. During the battle, the advisor Brun (Odin in disguise) placed Hetha in command of the right flank, Haco in command of the left, and made Wisna a standard-bearer. Wisna and Haco were defeated by Starkad the Old, who was wounded in return and had to leave the battle. After the death of Harald, the Danes petitioned the victorious King Ring to appoint Hetha over the remainder of the realm. He gave her most of Denmark, with the exception of Scania, which he gave to his cousin Olo. After the war was over, a group of Zealanders resented being ruled by a woman, so they appealed to Olo to invade, promising to revolt in his aid. Olo therefore overthrew Hetha, making her a tributary ruler in Jutland only. However, afterwards, Olo ruled so cruelly and unrighteously that many men who had supported him regretted that they had overthrown Hetha in his favour.

Heiðr also appears as a shield-maiden under Harald at the Battle of Brávellir in Sögubrot af nokkrum fornkonungum. Again, in this version, Visma carried Harald's banner and was defeated by Starkad the Old. Heiðr is positioned on the wing of Harald's forces with her own standard, perhaps in command of the wing, with a hundred of her own champions, and accompanied by other commanders. Her berserkers are named: Grim, Geir, Holmstein, Eysodul, Hedinn the Slim, Dag of Lifland, and Harald Olafsson. Before the battle, Heiðr accompanies Harald's commander Bruni to scout the enemy forces of Sigurd Ring. She is not made ruler of the Danes after the battle in this version, and Sigurd Ring becomes king of Denmark himself.
