= Æsir–Vanir War =

In Norse mythology, the first war in the world between the Æsir and Vanir

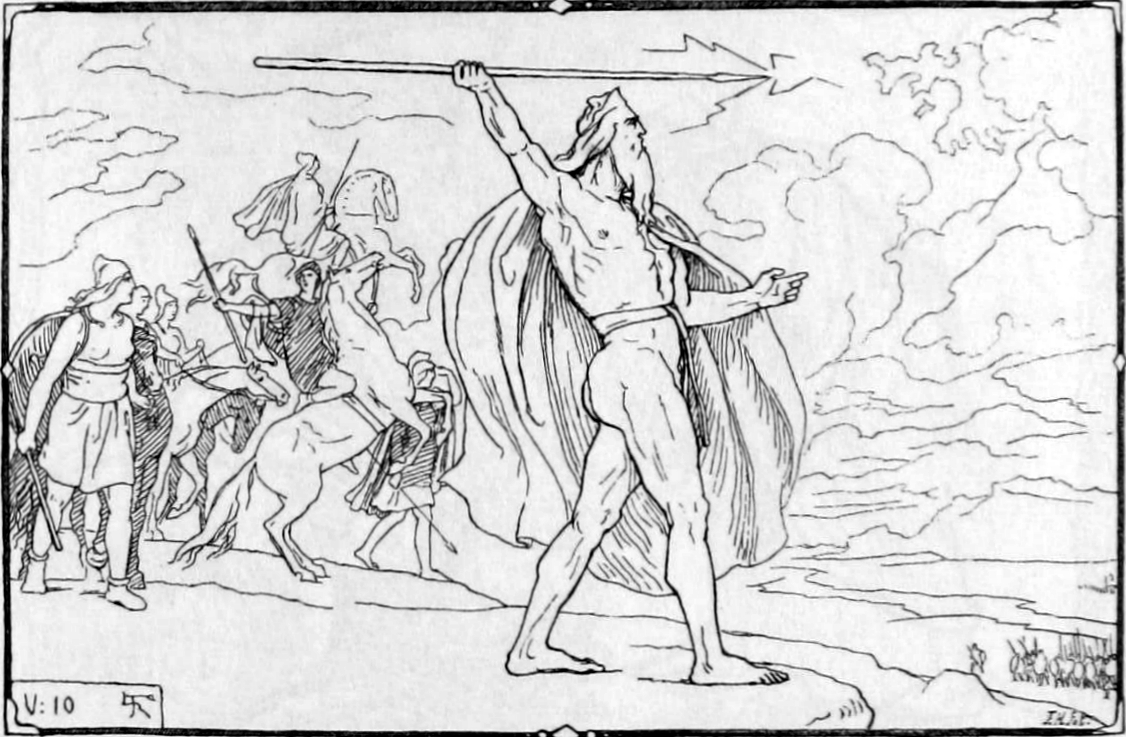
Óðinn throws his spear at the Vanir host, illustration by Lorenz Frølich (1895)

In Norse mythology, the Æsir–Vanir War (Note: Norwegian: Vanekrigen / Krigen mellom æser og vaner, Danish: Krigen mellem aser og vaner, Swedish: Vanakriget / Krig mellan asar och vaner.) was a conflict between two groups of deities that ultimately resulted in the unification of the Æsir and the Vanir into a single pantheon. The war is an important event in Norse mythology, and the implications for the potential historicity surrounding accounts of the war are a matter of scholarly debate and discourse.

Fragmented information about the war appears in surviving sources, including Völuspá, a poem collected in the Poetic Edda in the 13th century from earlier traditional sources; in the book Skáldskaparmál in the Prose Edda, written or compiled in the 13th century by Snorri Sturluson; and in euhemerized form in the Ynglinga saga from Heimskringla, also often considered to have been written by Snorri Sturluson in the 13th century.

== Attestations ==
=== Poetic Edda ===
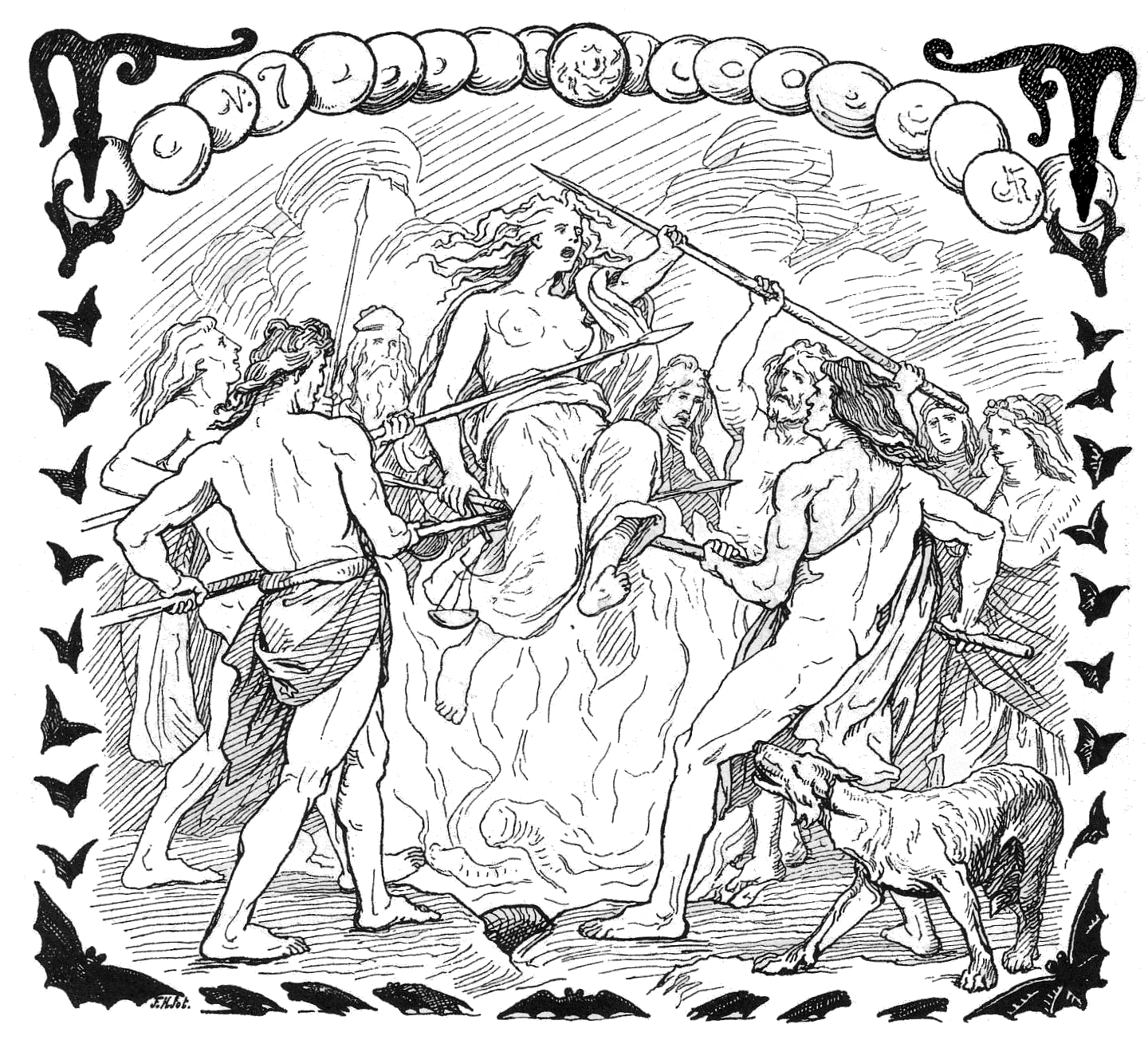
Gullveig is executed, illustration by Lorenz Frølich (1895).

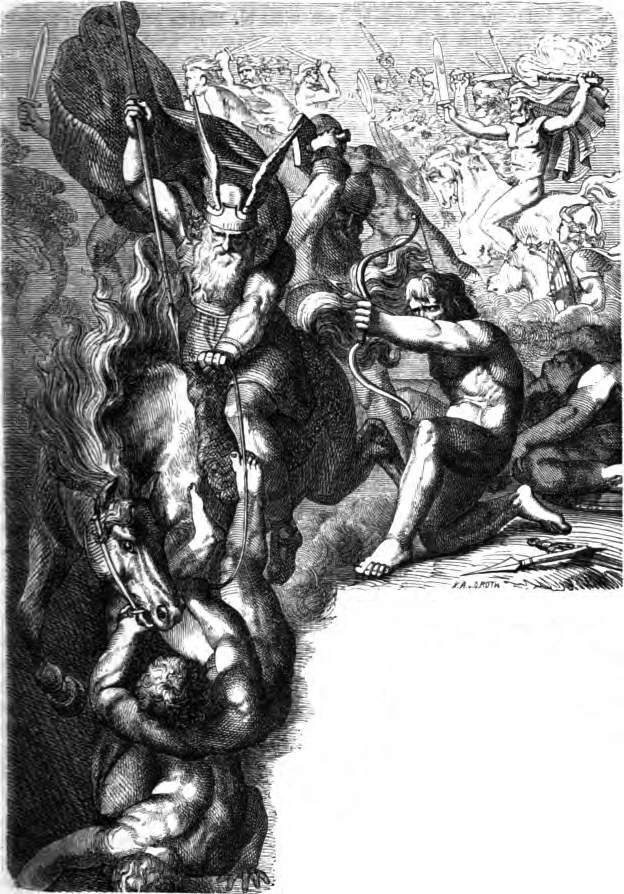
"The Æsir Against the Vanir" (1882) by Karl Ehrenberg.

In two stanzas of Völuspá, the war is recounted by a völva (who refers to herself here in the third person) while the god Óðinn questions her. The war is told rather vaguely, and the fact that it describes a war between the Æsir and the Vanir is not completely certain. In the first of the two stanzas, the völva says that she remembers the first war in the world, when Gullveig was stabbed with spears and then burnt three times in one of Óðinn's halls, yet that Gullveig was reborn three times:

The war I remember, | the first in the world,
When the gods with spears | had smitten Gollveig,
And in the hall | of Hor had burned her,
Three times burned, | and three times born,
Oft and again, | yet ever she lives.

— Henry Adams Bellows translation

In the second stanza, the völva says that they called Gullveig Heiðr (meaning "Bright One" or potentially "Gleaming" or "Honor") whenever she came to houses, that she was a wise völva, and that she cast spells. Heiðr performed seiðr where she could, did so in a trance, and was always the favorite of wicked women:

Heith they named her | who sought their home,
The wide-seeing witch, | in magic wise;
Minds she bewitched | that were moved by her magic,
To evil women | a joy she was.

— Henry Adams Bellows translation

In two later stanzas, the völva tells Óðinn that all the powers went to the judgment seats and discussed whether the Æsir should pay a fine or if all of the gods should instead have equal tribute, then the völva provides the last of her account of the events surrounding the war. These stanzas are unclear, particularly the second half of the first stanza, but the battle appears to have been precipitated by the entry of Gullveig/Heiðr among the Æsir. The first stanza relates a difficulty in reaching a truce which led to the all-out war described in the second stanza. However, the reference to "all the gods" could, in Lindow's view, indicate a movement towards a community involving both the Æsir and the Vanir. In his translation of the poem, Bellows inverts the order of the two stanzas, stating that "This stanza and stanza 24 [the first and second stanzas] have been transposed from the order in the manuscripts, for the former describes the battle and the victory of the Wanes [Vanir], after which the gods took council, debating whether to pay tribute to the victors, or to admit them, as was finally done, to equal rights of worship." Ursula Dronke points to extensive wordplay on all the meanings of the gildi and the adjective gildr to signal the core issue of whether the Æsir will surrender their monopoly on human tribute and join with the "all-too-popular" Vanir; as their only alternative, they attack again.

On the host his spear | did Othin hurl,
Then in the world | did war first come;
The wall that girdled | the gods was broken,
And the field by the warlike | Wanes was trodden.

Then sought the gods | their assembly-seats,
The holy ones, | and council held,
Whether the gods | should tribute give,
Or to all alike | should worship belong.

— Henry Adams Bellows translation, in his inverted order
Translation:

Then all the powers went to the judgment seats
the very holy gods, and discussed this:
whether the æsir should pay a fine,
or all the gods should have tribute.

That was yet the battle of armies, the first one in the world.
Odin let fly and shot into the army,
The shield wall of the fortress of the æsir was broken,
The battle-wise vanir knew how to tread the field.

— John Lindow translation, in the order of the original manuscript

=== Prose Edda ===
In the Prose Edda book Skáldskaparmál, the god Bragi explains the origin of poetry. Bragi says that it originated in the Æsir–Vanir War, when during the peace conference the Æsir and the Vanir formed a truce by all spitting into a vat. When they left, the gods decided that it should not be poured out, but rather kept as a symbol of their peace, and so from the contents made a man, Kvasir. Kvasir is later murdered, and from his blood is made the Mead of Poetry.

=== Heimskringla ===
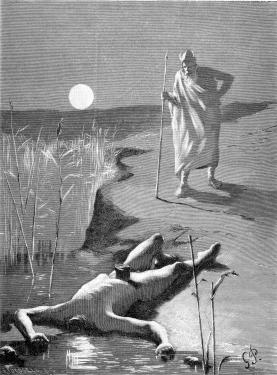
Óðinn with Mímir's body, illustration by Georg Pauli (1893)

In Heimskringla, the author presents a euhemerized account of the war. The account says that Óðinn led a great army from "Asgard" to attack the people of "Vanaheim". However, according to the author, the people of Vanaheim were well-prepared for the invasion; they defended their land so well that victory was up for grabs from both sides, and both sides produced immense damage and ravaged the lands of one another.

The two sides eventually tired of the war and both agreed to meet to establish a truce. After doing so, they exchanged hostages. Vanaheim is described as having sent to Asgard its best men: Njörðr—described as wealthy—and his son Freyr in exchange for Asgard Hœnir—described here as large, handsome, and thought of by the people of Vanaheim well-suited to be a chieftain. Additionally, Asgard sends Mímir—a man of great understanding—in exchange for Kvasir, which the author describes as the wisest man of Vanaheim. Upon arrival in Vanaheim, Hœnir was immediately made chief, and Mímir often gave him good counsel. However, when Hœnir was at meetings and at the Thing without Mímir by his side, he would always answer the same way: "Let others decide." Subsequently, the Vanaheim folk suspected they had been cheated in the exchange by the Asgard folk, so they seized Mímir and beheaded him and sent the head to Asgard. Óðinn took the head of Mímir, embalmed it with herbs so that it would not rot, and spoke charms over it, which gave it the power to speak to him and reveal to him secrets.

Óðinn then appointed Njörðr and Freyr to be priests of sacrificial customs and they became Diar ("Gods") of the people of Asgard. Freyja, described as daughter of Njörðr, was the priestess of these sacrifices, and here she is described as introducing seiðr to Asgard.

== Theories ==
A number of theories surround the Æsir–Vanir War:

=== Proto-Indo-European basis ===
As the Vanir are often considered fertility gods, the Æsir–Vanir War has been proposed as a reflection of the invasion of local fertility cults somewhere in regions inhabited by the Germanic peoples by a more aggressive, warlike cult. This has been proposed as an analogy of the invasion of the Indo-Europeans.

Georges Dumézil stated that the war need not necessarily be understood in terms of historicity more than any other myth however. Scholars have cited parallels between the Æsir–Vanir War, The Rape of the Sabine Women from Roman mythology, and the battle between Devas and Asuras from Hindu mythology, providing support for a Proto-Indo-European "war of the functions." Explaining these parallels, J. P. Mallory states:

Basically, the parallels concern the presence of first-(magico-juridical) and second-(warrior) function representatives on the victorious side of a war that ultimately subdues and incorporates third function characters, for example, the Sabine women or the Norse Vanir. Indeed, the Iliad itself has also been examined in a similar light. The ultimate structure of the myth, then, is that the three estates of Proto-Indo-European society were fused only after a war between the first two against the third.

=== Other ===
Many scholars consider the figures of Gullveig/Heiðr and Freyja the same. This conclusion has been reached through comparisons between Gullveig/Heiðr's use of seiðr in Völuspá and the mention of Freyja introducing seiðr to the Æsir from the Vanir in Heimskringla. This is at times taken further, to suggest that their "corruption" of the Æsir led to the Æsir–Vanir War.

Lindow states that even if the two are not identical, the various accounts of the war seem to share the idea of a disruptive entry of persons into a people. Lindow compares the appearance of Gullveig/Heiðr into the Æsir to Hœnir and Mímir's disruption among the Vanir in Heimskringla. Lindow further states that all three accounts share the notion of acquisition of tools for the conquest of wisdom; the practice of seiðr in two accounts and the head of Mímir in one.

== See also ==
- Gigantomachy
- Theomachy
- Titanomachy
- War in Heaven
- Devas
- Asuras
- Tollense valley battlefield

== Notes and references ==
=== Bibliography ===
- Crawford, Jackson (2015). The Poetic Edda: Stories of the Norse Gods and Heroes. Hackett Publishing Company.
- Bellows, Henry Adams (1923). The Poetic Edda. American-Scandinavian Foundation.
- Dronke, Ursula (Ed. and Trans.) (1997), The Poetic Edda volume 2: Mythological Poems. Clarendon Press ISBN 0-19-811181-9
- Dumézil, Georges (1973). Gods of the Ancient Northmen, trans. Einar Haugen. University of California Press ISBN 0-05-200350-7
- Faulkes, Anthony (Trans.) (1995). Snorri Sturluson. Edda. Everyman. ISBN 0-460-87616-3
- Grundy, Stephan (1998). "Freyja and Frigg" as collected in Billington, Sandra. The Concept of the Goddess.. Routledge ISBN 0-415-19789-9
- Hollander, Lee Milton (Trans.) (1964). Heimskringla: History of the Kings of Norway. University of Texas Press ISBN 0-292-73061-6
- Larrington, Carolyne (Trans.) (1999). The Poetic Edda. Oxford World's Classics ISBN 0-19-283946-2
- Lindow, John (2001). Norse Mythology: A Guide to the Gods, Heroes, Rituals, and Beliefs. Oxford University Press. ISBN 0-19-515382-0
- Mallory, J. P. (2005). In Search of the Indo-Europeans. Thames & Hudson. ISBN 0-500-27616-1
