= Seiðr =

Old Norse term for a type of shamanistic sorcery

In Old Norse, seiðr (sometimes anglicized as seidhr, seidh, seidr, seithr, seith, or seid) was a type of magic practiced in Norse society during the Late Scandinavian Iron Age. The practice of seiðr is believed to be a form of magic which is related to both the telling and the shaping of the future. Connected to the Old Norse religion, its origins are largely unknown, and its practice gradually declined after the Christianization of Scandinavia. Accounts of seiðr later made it into sagas and other literary sources, while further evidence of it has been unearthed by archaeologists. Various scholars have debated the nature of seiðr, some of them have argued that it was shamanic in context, involving visionary journeys by its practitioners.

Seiðr practitioners were of both sexes, with sorceresses being variously known as vǫlur, seiðkonur and vísendakona. There were also accounts of male practitioners, who were known as seiðmenn (or seiðmaðr in the singular). In many cases these magical practitioners would have had assistants to aid them in their rituals.

In pre-Christian Norse mythology, seiðr was associated with both the god Óðinn, a deity who was simultaneously responsible for war, poetry and sorcery, and the goddess Freyja, a member of the Vanir who was believed to have taught the practice to the Æsir.

In the 20th century, adherents of various modern Pagan new religious movements adopted forms of magico-religious practice which include seiðr. The practices of these contemporary seiðr-workers have since been investigated by various academic researchers who are operating in the field of pagan studies.

== Terminology and etymology ==
Seiðr is believed to come from Proto-Germanic *saiðaz, cognate with Lithuanian saitas, 'tie, tether' and Proto-Celtic *soito- 'sorcery' (giving Welsh hud, Breton hud 'magic'), all derived from Proto-Indo-European *soi-to- 'string, rope', ultimately from the Proto-Indo-European root *seH2i- 'to bind'.

Related words in Old High German (see German Saite, used both in string instruments and in bows) and Old English refer to 'cord, string', or 'snare, cord, halter' and there is a line in verse 15 of the skaldic poem Ragnarsdrápa that uses seiðr in that sense. However, it is not clear how this derivation relates to the practice of seiðr. It has been suggested that the use of a cord in attraction may be related to seiðr, where attraction is one element of the practice of seiðr magic described in Norse literature and with witchcraft in Scandinavian folklore. However, if seiðr involved "spinning charms", that would explain the distaff, a tool used in spinning flax or sometimes wool, that appears to be associated with seiðr practice. In any case, the string relates to the "threads of fate", that the Nornir spin, measure, and cut.

Old English terms cognate with seiðr are -siden (as a suffix in the noun ælfsiden, in various inflected forms) and sidsa, both of which are attested only in contexts that suggest that they were used by elves (ælfe); these seem likely to have meant something similar to seiðr. Among the Old English words for practitioners of magic are wicca (m.) or wicce (f.), the etymons of Modern English 'witch'.

== Old Norse literature ==
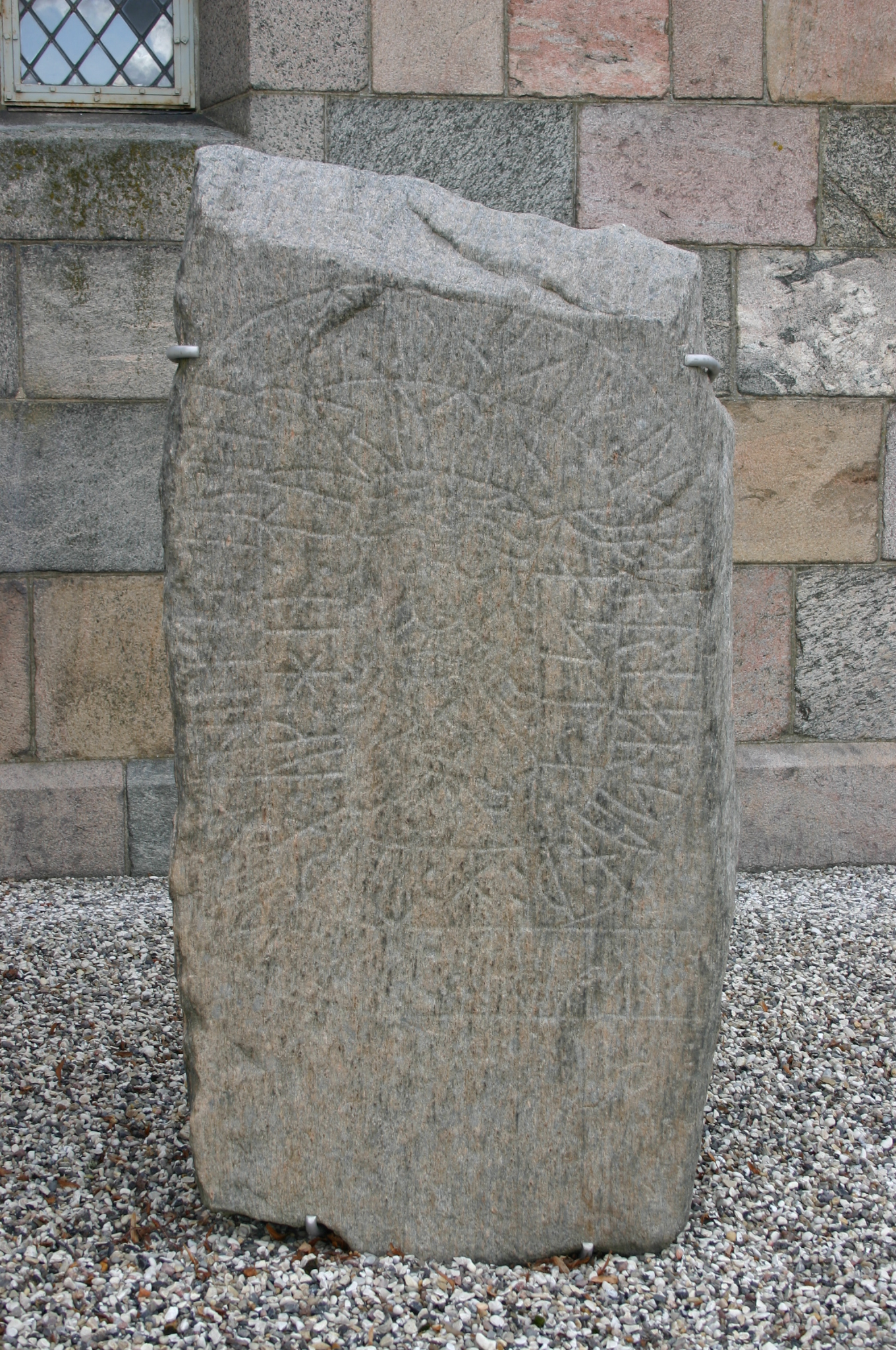
The Skern Runestone has a curse regarding a 'siþi' or 'seiðr worker'.

=== Sagas ===
==== Erik the Red ====
In the 13th century Saga of Erik the Red, there was a seiðkona or vǫlva in Greenland named Þórbjǫrg ('protected by Thor'). She wore a blue cloak and a headpiece of black lamb trimmed with white ermine, carried the symbolic distaff (seiðstafr), which was buried with her, and would sit on a high platform. As related in the saga:

En er hon kom um kveldit ok sá maðr, er móti henni var sendr, þá var hon svá búin, at hon hafði yfir sér tuglamöttul blán, ok var settr steinum allt í skaut ofan. Hon hafði á hálsi sér glertölur, lambskinnskofra svartan á höfði ok við innan kattarskinn hvít. Ok hon hafði staf í hendi, ok var á knappr. Hann var búinn með messingu ok settr steinum ofan um knappinn. Hon hafði um sik hnjóskulinda, ok var þar á skjóðupungr mikill, ok varðveitti hon þar í töfr sín, þau er hon þurfti til fróðleiks at hafa. Hon hafði á fótum kálfskinnsskúa loðna ok í þvengi langa ok á tinknappar miklir á endunum. Hon hafði á höndum sér kattskinnsglófa, ok váru hvítir innan ok loðnir.

Now, when she came in the evening, accompanied by the man who had been sent to meet her, she was dressed in such wise that she had a blue mantle over her, with strings for the neck, and it was inlaid with gems quite down to the skirt. On her neck she had glass beads. On her head she had a black hood of lambskin, lined with ermine. A staff she had in her hand, with a knob thereon; it was ornamented with brass, and inlaid with gems round about the knob. Around her she wore a girdle of soft hair (or belt of touch wood), and therein was a large skin-bag, in which she kept the talismans needful to her in her wisdom. She wore hairy calf-skin shoes on her feet, with long and strong-looking thongs to them, and great knobs of latten at the ends. On her hands she had gloves of ermine-skin, and they were white and hairy within.

==== Other sagas ====
As described by Snorri Sturluson in his Ynglinga saga, seiðr includes both divination and manipulative magic. It seems likely that the divination of seiðr-practitioners was distinct, in a metaphysical nature, from the day-to-day auguries performed by the seers (menn framsýnir, menn forspáir).

However, in chapter 44 of the Icelandic saga Vatnsdæla saga, Þórdís Spákona loans someone her black cloak and stick (stafsprotann) for magic. The stick is used to strike a man three times on his left cheek to make him forget and three times on his right cheek to make him remember.

=== Folktales ===
Seiðr is mentioned in Icelandic folktales dating to the 19th century (Íslenzkar Þjóðsögur og Æfintýri, Jón Árnason).

== Practices ==
Seiðr involved the incantation of spells (galdrar, sg. galdr). Practitioners may have been religious leaders of the Viking community and usually required the help of other practitioners to invoke their deities, gods, or spirits. As they are described in a number of other Scandinavian sagas, Saga of Erik the Red in particular, the practitioners connected with the spiritual realm through chanting and prayer. Viking texts suggest that the seiðr ritual was used in times of inherent crisis, as a tool for seeing into the future, and for cursing and hexing one's enemies. Overall, Seiðr could have been used for great good or destructive evil, as well as for daily guidance.

One author, Neil Price, argues that it was very likely that some parts of the practice involved sexual acts, given that ritual staves have phallic epithets in various Icelandic sagas. Price also argues that, because of its connection with ergi, seiðr was "undoubtedly located on one of society's moral and psychological borders."

== Mythology ==
=== Óðinn and seiðr ===
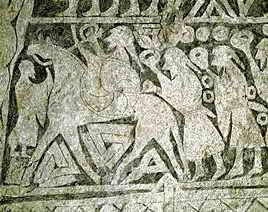
The 7th century Tängelgårda stone shows Óðinn leading a troop of warriors all bearing rings. Valknut symbols are drawn beneath his horse, which is depicted with four legs.

British archaeologist Neil Price noted that "the realm of sorcery" was present in Óðinn's many aspects.

One possible example of seiðr in Norse mythology is the prophetic vision given to Óðinn in the Vǫluspá by the völva after whom the poem is named. Her vision is not connected explicitly with seiðr; however, the word occurs in the poem in relation to a character called Heiðr (who is traditionally associated with Freyja but may be identical with the völva). The interrelationship between the vǫlva in this account and the Norns, the fates of Norse lore, is strong and striking.

Another noted mythological practitioner of seiðr was Gróa, who attempted to assist Thor, and who in the Svipdagsmál in a poem entitled Grógaldr "Gróa's spell" is summoned from beyond the grave.

=== Freyja and seiðr ===
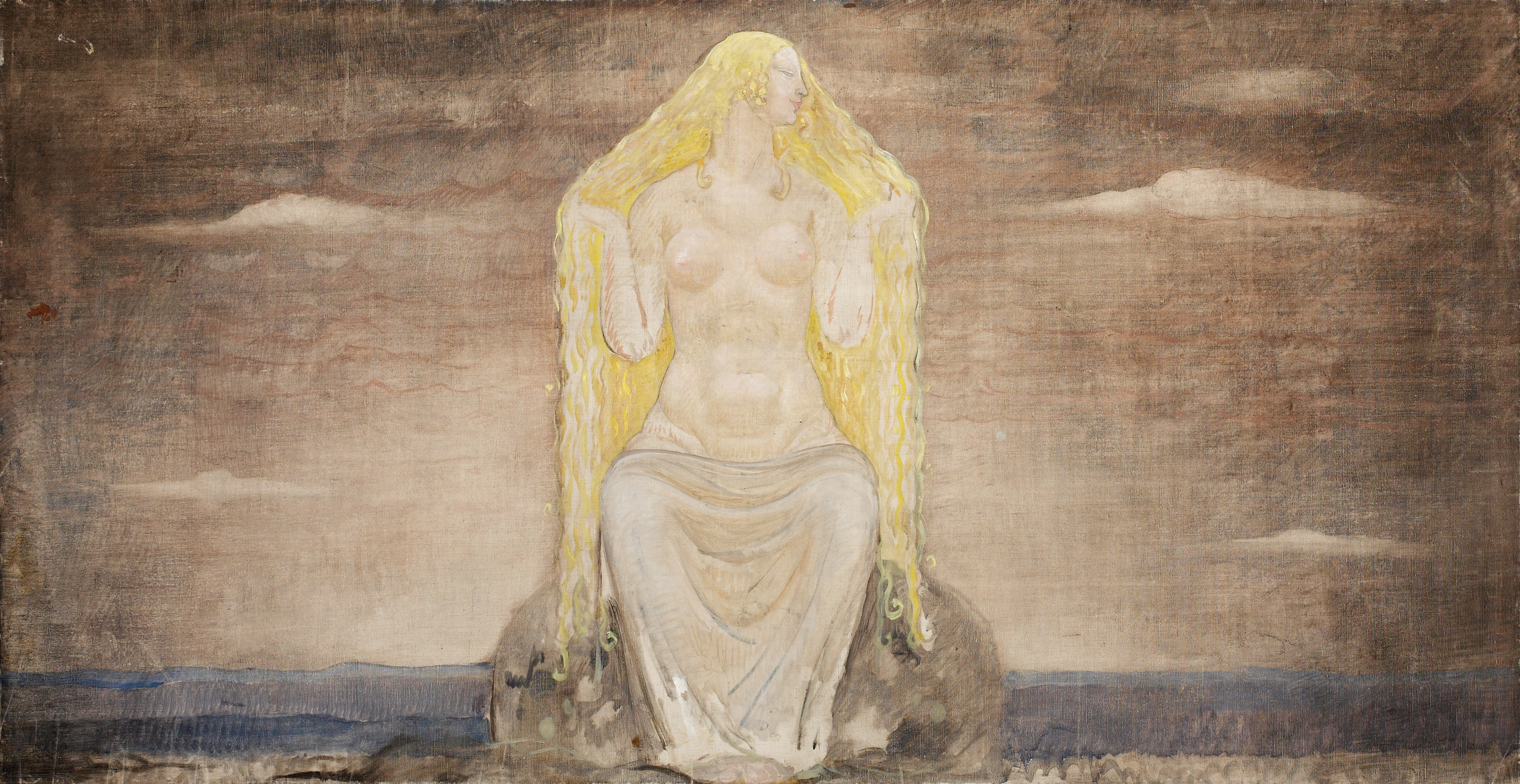
Freja (1905) by John Bauer (1882–1918)

Like Óðinn, the Norse goddess Freyja is also associated with seiðr in the surviving literature. In the Ynglinga saga (c. 1225), written by Icelandic poet Snorri Sturluson, it is stated that seiðr had originally been a practice among the Vanir, but that Freyja, who was herself a member of the Vanir, had introduced it to the Æsir when she joined them.

Freyja is identified in Ynglinga saga as an adept of the mysteries of seiðr, and it is said that it was she who taught it to Óðinn:

Dóttir Njarðar var Freyja. Hon var blótgyðja. Hon kenndi fyrst með Ásum seið, sem Vǫnum var títt.

"Njǫrðr’s daughter was Freyja. She presided over the sacrifice. It was she who first acquainted the Æsir with seiðr, which was customary among the Vanir."

== Origins ==
Since the publication of Jacob Grimm's socio-linguistical Deutsches Wörterbuch (p. 638) in 1835, scholarship draws a Balto-Finnic link to seiðr, citing the depiction of its practitioners as such in the sagas and elsewhere, and linking seiðr to the practices of the noaidi, the patrilineal shamans of the Sami people. However, Indo-European origins are also possible. Note that the Finnish word seita and the Sami variants of the term sieidde refer to a human-shaped tree or a large and strangely-shaped stone or rock and do not necessarily reference magical power. There is a good case, however, that these words do derive ultimately from seiðr.

== Seiðr and gender roles in Norse society ==
A woman practicing seiðr would sometimes be called völva, meaning seeress. She would also sometimes be described as spá-kona or seið-kona, meaning 'prophecy-woman' and 'magic-woman', respectively. According to Thor Ewing, because seiðr was viewed as a feminine practice, any man who engaged in it (seiðmaðr) was associated with a concept called ergi, the designation of a man in Norse society who was unmanly, feminine and possibly homosexual.

Sometimes, female practitioners of the craft would take on young male apprentices, and those who became mothers would teach the practice to their sons.

== Contemporary paganism ==
Contemporary paganism, also referred to as neopaganism, is an umbrella term used to identify a wide variety of new religious movements, particularly those influenced by the various pagan beliefs of premodern Europe. Several of these contemporary pagan religions draw specifically on the original medieval religious beliefs and practices of Anglo-Saxon England as sources of inspiration, adopting such Anglo-Saxon deities as their own.

Seiðr is interpreted differently by different groups and practitioners, but usually taken to indicate altered consciousness or even total loss of physical control. Diana L. Paxson and her group Hrafnar have attempted reconstructions of seiðr (particularly the oracular form) from historical material. Author Jan Fries regards seiðr as a form of "shamanic trembling", which he relates to "seething", used as a shamanic technique, the idea being his own and developed through experimentation. According to Blain, seiðr is an intrinsic part of spiritual practice connecting practitioners to the wider cosmology in British Germanic neopaganism.
