= Juthungi =

Germanic tribe

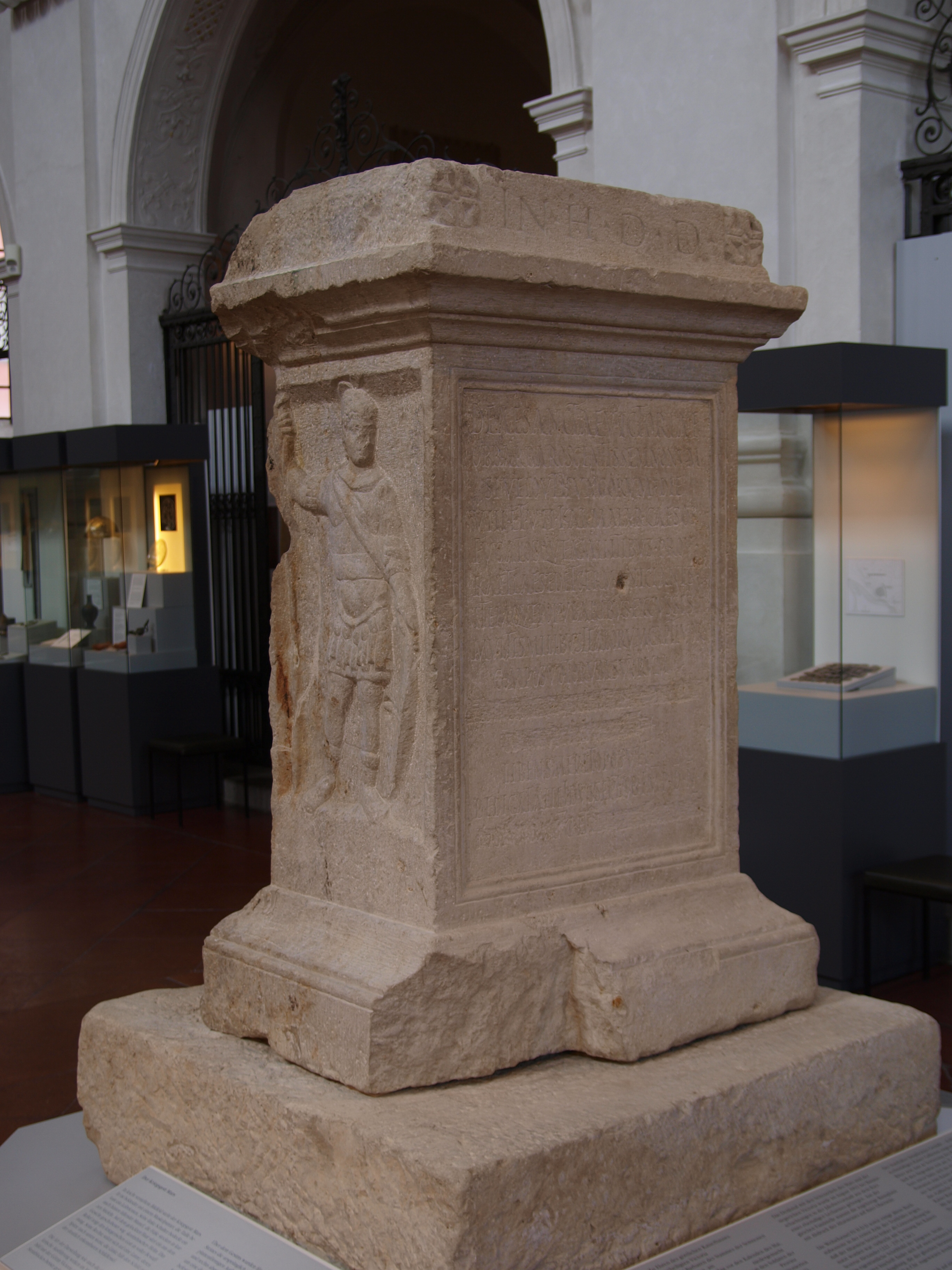
Memorial stone from Augsburg

The Juthungi (Ancient Greek: Ιούθουγγοι, Latin: Iuthungi) were a Germanic tribe in the region north of the river Danube somewhere near what is now the northern part of the modern German state of Bavaria.

The tribe is mentioned in only a few surviving records, stretching from the 3rd to the 5th century AD, about 260 to 430 AD.

There is evidence that the Juthungi may have begun as a subtribe of the Semnones and later became a part of the larger mixed people, the Alemanni, who like the Juthungi first appeared in the third century.

== Name ==
Their name is interpreted by scholars as a Germanic term meaning “descendants,” “offspring,” “shoots,” perhaps implying that they began as a “young-warrior group". The first part of the word is associated with Old Norse jóð, meaning a baby, and a reconstructed Proto-Germanic stem *euþą is reconstructed, also meaning baby.

== History ==
Like the names of the Franks, Alemanni and Goths, the name of the Juthungi first appears in the third century AD, after the major changes in non-Roman Central Europe caused by the crushing Roman victory over the Marcomanni and their Suebian and Sarmatian allies during the Marcomannic Wars, and during the Crisis of the Third Century, which reduced Roman power.

=== Invasion of 260 ===
The first surviving record of the Juthungi is when they invaded Italy in 259–260, but on their way back they were defeated and put to flight near Augsburg on 24–25 April 260 by Marcus Simplicinius Genialis. This is recorded on the Roman-made Augsburg Victory Altar, found in Augsburg in 1992. This record describes the Juthungi as Semnones, calling them “the barbarian people the Semnones, or — more precisely — the Juthungi” (Latin: barbaros gentis Semnonum sive Iouthungorum). Later chronicles report incursions into Italy at this time describing the invaders as Germani or Alamanni. Prosper of Aquitaine and the Chronica Gallica of 511 state that Alamanni crossed into Italy after devastating Gaul, while Eutropius and Orosius describe the invaders more generally as Germani. These sources do not explicitly identify the invaders with the Juthungi named on the Augsburg altar.

Soon afterwards, they appear in a surviving fragment written by the historian Dexippus relating to 270/271 AD concerning another invasion of Italy. This record describes the Juthungi as Scythians (Ancient Greek: ᾽Ιουθουγγους Σκύθας), but the term "Scythian" is being used here to refer to a generic type of mobile northern barbarian, not a specific ethnic designation. Zosimus refers to these invaders of Italy as Alemanni and tribes neighbouring the Alemanni.

=== Invasion of 270/271 ===
In 270 or, more probably, 271, the Juthungi, invaded northern Italy again, and were once again also referred to as Alemanni in a later source. The emperor Aurelian was defeated near Placentia, but subsequently defeated the invaders at Fanum Fortunae and Ticinum. The ancient sources use different names for the invaders. Dexippus, a contemporary, calls them Juthungi, the Historia Augusta calls them Marcomanni, and Zosimus calls them Alemanni.

Dexippus described the defeated Juthungi being attacked by Aurelian as they retreated over the Danube. The survivors sent an embassy to the emperor, aiming to show no fear, and to renegotiate Roman payments that they had previously been receiving. Aurelian lined up his Roman forces to intimidate, but then through an interpreter the Juthungi claimed that with "a very small part" of their military resources they "attacked the cities near the Danube and almost took possession of all Italy". "We campaigned with cavalry numbering forty thousand — and these were not mixed men, nor weak men, but purely Iuthungi, who have a great reputation for fighting on horseback. We also bring an infantry force twice the size of the cavalry, and in this case too we do not obscure the incomparable quality of our own army by admixtures from others." Modern scholars suggest that this claim of purity was probably meant to take advantage of Roman stereotypes, by contrasting the Juthungi with their neighbours the Alemanni, who were seen as a mix of many peoples.

They claimed to prefer peace to war, and insisted on continuing to receive the "payments formerly received from the Romans", implying there had been a treaty relationship that obliged the Romans to provide gifts "in confirmation of friendship". In reply Aurelian refused and threatened the Juthungi, and they departed in fear, without a new agreement. Zosimus notes that "several members of the senate being at this time accused of conspiring against the emperor were put to death; and Rome, which before had no walls, was now surrounded with them".

=== Later records ===
Around 297, one of the Latin Panegyrics mentions the Juthungi together with the Carpi and Quadi as peoples often routed by the emperor Constantius Chlorus.

The Laterculus Veronensis is an imperial record of provinces and peoples of the Empire written around 314 AD. The "Iotungi" appear in a list of barbarian (non-Roman) peoples who grew under the 3rd century emperors. They appear after the Gallouari (otherwise unknown) and are followed by the Armilausini and then the Marcomanni. They are listed separately from the Alemanni. In the Cosmographia of Julius Honorius, probably reflecting fourth century positions, the "Iuthungi" appear listed after the Langobards and Burgundians, and are followed by the Armilausini, and then the Marcomanni. The name of the Juthungi also appears as "Iutugi" on the Tabula Peutingeriana, which probably represents 4th or 5th century information, squeezed among the names of people north of the Danube, near the Quadi, and east of the Vanduli and Marcomanni.

Between 356 and 358 Ammianus Marcellinus described the Juthungi as a part the Alemanni (Alamannorum pars) who lived on the boundaries of Italy. During a period of uncertainty they ignored peace treaties and invaded the province of Raetia, now southern Bavaria, and even tried to besiege towns, which was "contrary to their habit". The Romans defeated them and according to Ammianus a small remnant barely escaped.

According to a letter written by St. Ambrose of Milan to the usurper emperor in Gaul, Magnus Maximus, there were Juthungi raiding Raetia in 384 when Valentinian II's military leader Bauto allowed Alans and Huns to enter Raetia from the east and fight them. Maximus saw this as the build up of an attack upon Gaul, but Ambrose protested that the young emperor Valentinian called off the Huns and Alans when their ransacking of the Alemanni came too close to Gaul. The Huns were supposedly compelled to call off their triumphs so that Maximus would have nothing to fear.

In approximately the 390s, the Notitia Dignitatum shows there were two Juthungi military units within the Eastern Roman military. The "Cohors quarta Iuthungorum, Affrodit", an infantry unit (cohort) was under an Egyptian command, and the "Ala prima Iuthungorum, Salutaria", an elite auxiliary cavalry unit (ala), was under the Syrian military command.

In about 430 the Roman general Aëtius also fought first against the Juthungi, and then against rebels in Noricum, the province just east of Raetia. According to Sidonius Apollinaris he then also defeated Vindelici, the inhabitants of the northern part of Roman Raetia.

== Fate of the Juthungi ==
The Roman historians often generalized multiple Germanic tribes with terms like Alamanni, Franks or Bavarians, so it is difficult to determine the precise fate of the Juthungi after their defeats and into the 4th and 5th centuries CE. It is likely that the Juthungi integrated into one of the Germanic tribal federations—perhaps the Alemanni, since they were mentioned together in several accounts.

== Bibliography ==
- Castritius, Helmut (1998). "Semnonen – Juthungen – Alemannen. Neues (und Altes) zur Herkunft und Ethnogenese der Alemannen". In Geuenich, Dieter (ed.). Die Franken und die Alemannen bis zur "Schlacht bei Zülpich" (496/97). Reallexikon der Germanischen Altertumskunde – Ergänzungsbände. Vol. 19. De Gruyter. pp. 349–366. ISBN 978-3-11-015826-7.
- Geuenich, Dieter (2000), "Juthungen § 2. Historisches", in Beck, Heinrich; Geuenich, Dieter; Steuer, Heiko (eds.), Reallexikon der Germanischen Altertumskunde, vol. 16 (2 ed.), De Gruyter, pp. 141–142, ISBN 978-3-11-016782-5
- Liccardo, Salvatore (2024). Old names, new peoples: listing ethnonyms in late antiquity. Leiden Boston: Brill. ISBN 9789004685895.
- Neumann, Günter (2000), "Juthungen § 1. Der Name", in Beck, Heinrich; Geuenich, Dieter; Steuer, Heiko (eds.), Reallexikon der Germanischen Altertumskunde, vol. 16 (2 ed.), De Gruyter, pp. 141–142, ISBN 978-3-11-016782-5
- Runde, Ingo (1998). "Die Franken und Alemannen vor 500. Ein chronologischer Überblick". In Geuenich, Dieter (ed.). Die Franken und die Alemannen bis zur "Schlacht bei Zülpich" (496/97). Reallexikon der Germanischen Altertumskunde – Ergänzungsbände. Vol. 19. De Gruyter. ISBN 978-3-11-015826-7.
- Witschel, Christian (2020). "Germanische Einfälle in die Provinzen an Rhein und oberer Donau im 3. Jh. n. Chr.: Die Problematik der epigraphischen, numismatischen und archäologischen Zeugnisse". In Mitthof, Fritz; Martin, Gunther; Grusková, Jana (eds.). Empire in Crisis: Gothic Invasions and Roman Historiography. Tyche Supplementband. Vol. 12. Wien: Verlag Holzhausen. pp. 423–530. ISBN 978-3-903207-38-7.
- Wolfram, Herwig (18 March 2005). The Roman Empire and Its Germanic Peoples. Univ of California Press. ISBN 978-0-520-24490-0.

== See also ==
- List of ancient Germanic peoples
