= Grove of Fetters =

Location in Norse mythology

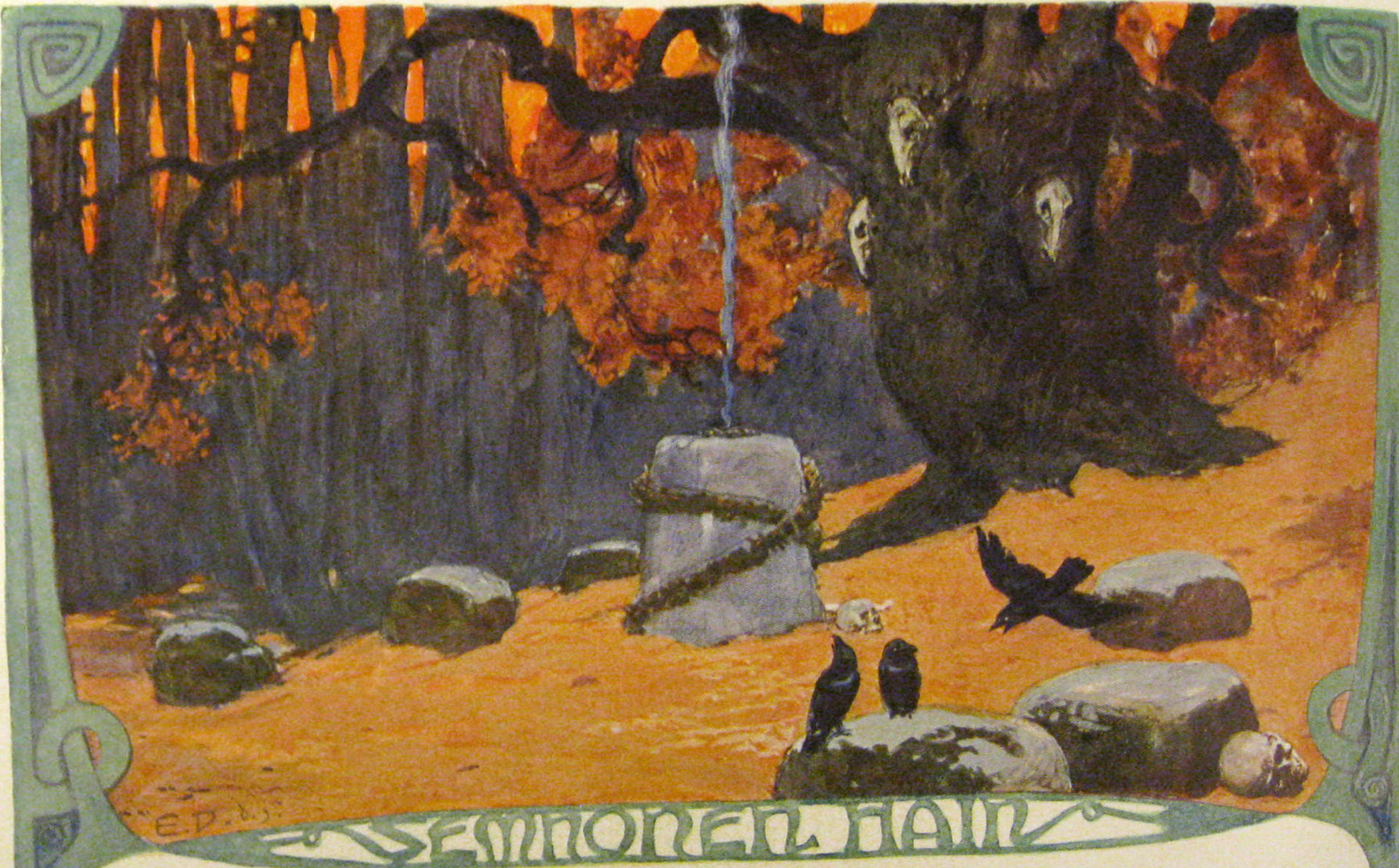
The Semnones' Grove of Fetters (1905) by Emil Doepler.

A grove of Fetters (Old Norse: Fjöturlundr) is mentioned in the Eddic poem "Helgakviða Hundingsbana II":

Helgi obtained Sigrún, and they had sons. Helgi lived not to be old. Dag, the son of Högni, sacrificed to Odin, for vengeance for his father. Odin lent Dag his spear. Dag met with his relation Helgi in a place called Fiöturlund, and pierced him through with his spear. Helgi fell there, but Dag rode to the mountains and told Sigrún what had taken place.
― Helgakviða Hundingsbana II, Thorpe's translation

The description is often compared with a section by Tacitus on a sacred grove of the Semnones:

At a stated period, all the tribes of the same race assemble by their representatives in a grove consecrated by the auguries of their forefathers, and by immemorial associations of terror. Here, having publicly slaughtered a human victim, they celebrate the horrible beginning of their barbarous rite. Reverence also in other ways is paid to the grove. No one enters it except bound with a chain, as an inferior acknowledging the might of the local divinity. If he chance to fall, it is not lawful for him to be lifted up, or to rise to his feet; he must crawl out along the ground. All this superstition implies the belief that from this spot the nation took its origin, that here dwells the supreme and all-ruling deity, to whom all else is subject and obedient.

Due to the resemblance between the two texts, some scholars have identified the deity of the Semnones with an early form of Odin. Others suggest an early form of Týr may have been involved, as he is the Germanic continuation of Proto-Indo-European sky-father '*dyeus', whose cognates are Jupiter and Zeus. Furthermore, Tacitus reports that the Germanic peoples of his age regarded a "Tuisco" or "Tuisto" as the progenitor of mankind, which is sometimes surmised to be a Latinisation of Proto-Germanic '*Tiwaz', which later became "Týr" in Old Norse.
