= Fólkvangr =

Norse mythical location

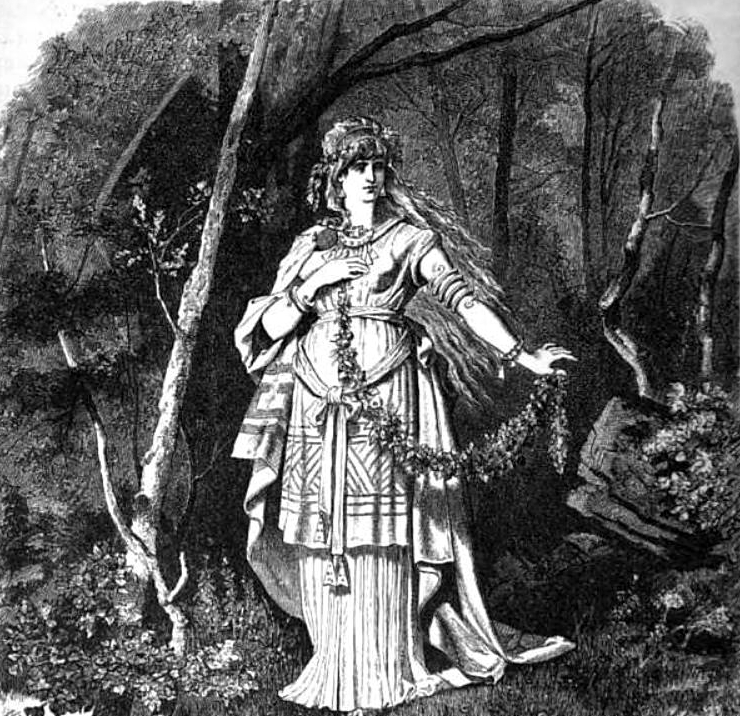
"Freya" (1882) by Carl Emil Doepler

Fólkvangr (Old Norse "field of the host" or "people-field" or "army-field") is a meadow or field ruled over by the goddess Freyja where half of those that die in combat go upon death, whilst the other half go to the god Odin in Valhalla. Others were also brought to Fólkvangr after their death; Egils Saga, for example, has a world-weary female character declare that she will never taste food again until she dines with Freyja. Fólkvangr is attested in the Poetic Edda, compiled in the 13th century from earlier traditional sources, and the Prose Edda, written in the 13th century by Snorri Sturluson. According to the Prose Edda, within Fólkvangr is Freyja's hall Sessrúmnir. Scholarly theories have been proposed about the implications of the location.

== Attestations ==
In the poem Grímnismál collected in the Poetic Edda, Odin (disguised, or Grímnir) tells the young Agnar that Freyja allots seats in her hall Fólkvangr to half of those that die, while Odin receives the other half (Fólkvangr is here anglicized to Fôlkvang and Folkvang):

Benjamin Thorpe translation:

Fôlkvang is the ninth, there Freyia directs
the sittings in the hall.
She half the fallen chooses each day,
but Odin th' other half.

Henry Adams Bellows translation:

The ninth is Folkvang, where Freyja decrees
Who shall have seats in the hall;
The half of the dead each day does she choose,
And half does Othin have.

In chapter 24 of the Prose Edda book Gylfaginning, High tells Gangleri (described as king Gylfi in disguise) that Freyja is "the most glorious of the ásynjur", that Freyja has a dwelling in the heavens called Fólkvangr, and that "whenever she rides to battle she gets half of the slain, and the other half Odin, as it says here: [the stanza above from Grímnismál is then quoted]". High then continues with a description of Freyja's hall Sessrúmnir.

== Theories ==
=== Egils saga ===
In Egils saga, when Egill Skallagrímsson refuses to eat, his daughter Þorgerðr (here anglicized as "Thorgerd") says she will go without food and thus starve to death, and in doing so will meet the goddess Freyja:

Thorgerd replied in a loud voice, "I have had no evening meal, nor will I do so until I join Freyja. I know no better course of action than my father's. I do not want to live after my father and brother are dead."

Britt-Mari Näsström says that "as a receiver of the dead her [Freyja's] abode is also open for women who have suffered a noble death." Näsström cites the above passage from Egils saga as an example, and points to a potential additional connection in the saga Hervarar saga ok Heiðreks, where the queen hangs herself in the dísarsalr (Old Norse "the Hall of the Dís") after discovering that her husband has betrayed both her father and brother. Näsström comments that "this Dís could hardly be anyone but Freyja herself, the natural leader of the collective female deities called dísir, and the place of the queen's suicide seems thus to be connected with Freyja."

=== Implications ===
John Lindow says that if the Fólk- element of Fólkvangr is to be understood as "army", then Fólkvangr appears as an alternative to Valhalla. Lindow adds that, like Odin, Freyja has an association with warriors in that she presides over the eternal combat of Hjaðningavíg.

Rudolf Simek theorizes that the name Fólkvangr is "surely not much older than Grímnismál itself", and adds that the Gylfaginning description keeps close to the Grímnismál description, yet that the Gylfaginning descriptions adds that Sessrúmnir is located within Fólkvangr. According to Hilda Ellis Davidson, Valhalla "is well known because it plays so large a part in images of warfare and death," yet the significance of other halls in Norse mythology such as Ýdalir, where the god Ullr dwells, and Freyja's Fólkvangr have been lost.

Britt-Mari Näsström places emphasis on that Gylfaginning relates that "whenever she rides into battle she takes half of the slain," and interprets Fólkvangr as "the field of the Warriors." Näsström comments that:

Freyja receives the slain heroes of the battlefield quite respectfully as Óðinn does. Her house is called Sessrumnir, "filled with many seats", and it probably fills the same function as Valhöll, "the hall of the slain", where the warriors eat and drink beer after the fighting. Still, we must ask why there are two heroic paradises in the Old Norse View of afterlife. It might possibly be a consequence of different forms of initiation of warriors, where one part seemed to have belonged to Óðinn and the other to Freyja. These examples indicate that Freyja was a war-goddess, and she even appears as a valkyrie, literally "the one who chooses the slain".

Siegfried Andres Dobat comments that "in her mythological role as the chooser of half the fallen warriors for her death realm Fólkvangr, the goddess Freyja, however, emerges as the mythological role model for the Valkyrjar and the dísir."

=== Stone ships and Proto-Germanic afterlife location ===
In a 2012 paper, Joseph S. Hopkins and Haukur Þorgeirsson propose a connection between Fólkvangr, Sessrúmnir, and numerous stone ships found throughout Scandinavia. According to Hopkins and Haukur, Fólkvangr and Sessrumir together paint an image of a ship and a field, which has broader implications and may connect Freyja to the "Isis" of the Suebi:

Perhaps each source has preserved a part of the same truth and Sessrúmnir was conceived of as both a ship and an afterlife location in Fólkvangr. "A ship in a field" is a somewhat unexpected idea, but it is strongly reminiscent of the stone ships in Scandinavian burial sites. "A ship in the field" in the mythical realm may have been conceived as a reflection of actual burial customs and vice versa. It is possible that the symbolic ship was thought of as providing some sort of beneficial property to the land, such as good seasons and peace brought on by Freyr's mound burial in Ynglinga saga.

Evidence involving ships from the pre-Christian period and from folklore may be similarly re-examined with this potential in mind. For example, if Freyja is taken as a possessor of a ship, then this ship iconography may lend support to positions arguing for a connection between a Vanir goddess and the "Isis" of the Suebi, who is associated with ship symbolism in Tacitus’s Germania. Afterlife beliefs involving strong nautical elements, and, separately, afterlife fields, have been identified in numerous Indo-European cultures …"

Hopkins and Haukur additionally propose a connection between Fólkvangr and a variety of other Germanic words referring to the afterlife that contain extensions of Proto-Germanic *wangaz, including Old English Neorxnawang, potentially pointing to an early Germanic '*wangaz of the dead'.

== Modern influence ==
Early in the 20th century, Karl Ernst Osthaus developed the "Folkwang-Gedanke" or "Folkwang-Konzept", that art and life can be reconciled. Several cultural institutions bearing the name Folkwang (the German spelling of Fólkvangr) were founded on this concept. These institutions include the Museum Folkwang in Essen (opened 1902), the publishing house Folkwang-Verlag (founded 1919), Folkwang Kammerorchester Essen (founded 1958), Folkwang-Musikschule in Essen (founded 1974), and Folkwang University of the Arts, focusing on music, theater, dance, design and academic studies.

== See also ==
- Þrúðvangr, the field of the god Thor
- Neorxnawang, a term used as a gloss for Christian paradise in Anglo-Saxon texts, whose latter component means 'field'
- Valfreyja, a name appearing in Njáls saga as a kenning meaning 'lady of the slain' or 'Freyja of the slain'

== General and cited references ==
- Bellows, Henry Adams (1923). The Poetic Edda. American-Scandinavian Foundation.
- Davidson, Hilda Roderick Ellis (1993). The Lost Beliefs of Northern Europe (illustrated edition). Routledge. ISBN 0-415-04937-7
- Dobat, Siegfried Andres (2006). "Bridging Mythology and Belief: Viking Age Functional Culture as a Reflection of the Belief in Divine Intervention" as collected in Andren, A. Jennbert, K. Raudvere, C. Old Norse Religions in Long Term Perspectives: Origins, Changes and Interactions, an International Conference in Lund, Sweden, June 3-7, 2004. Nordic Academic Press. ISBN 91-89116-81-X
- Faulkes, Anthony (Trans.) (1995). Edda. Everyman. ISBN 0-460-87616-3
- Hopkins, Joseph S. and Haukur Þorgeirsson (2012). "The Ship in the Field". RMN Newsletter 3, 2011:14-18. University of Helsinki.
- Lindow, John (2001). Norse Mythology: A Guide to the Gods, Heroes, Rituals, and Beliefs. Oxford University Press. ISBN 0-19-515382-0
- Näsström, Britt-Mari (1999). "Freyja - The Trivalent Goddess" as collected in Sand, Reenberg Erik. Sørensen, Jørgen Podemann (1999). Comparative Studies in History of Religions: Their Aim, Scope and Validity. Museum Tusculanum Press. ISBN 87-7289-533-0
- Orchard, Andy (1997). Dictionary of Norse Myth and Legend. Cassell. ISBN 0-304-34520-2
- Scudder, Bernard (Trans.) (2001). "Egils saga" as collected in various (2001). The Sagas of Icelanders. Penguin Group. ISBN 0-14-100003-1
- Simek, Rudolf (2007) translated by Angela Hall. Dictionary of Northern Mythology. D.S. Brewer. ISBN 0-85991-513-1
- Thorpe, Benjamin (Trans.) (1907). The Elder Edda of Saemund Sigfusson. Norrœna Society.
