= Baduhenna =

Germanic pagan goddess

In Germanic paganism, Baduhenna is a goddess. Baduhenna is solely attested in Tacitus's Annals where Tacitus records that a sacred grove in ancient Frisia was dedicated to her, and that near this grove 900 Roman soldiers were killed in 28 AD by the Frisii. Scholars have analyzed the name of the goddess and linked the figure to the Germanic Matres and Matronae.

== Etymology ==
The first element of the goddess's name, Badu-, may be cognate to Proto-Germanic *badwa- meaning "battle." The second portion of the name *-henna appears as *-henae in the names of matrons, Germanic goddesses widely attested from the 1st to 5th century CE on votive stones and votive altars. Rudolf Simek states that the goddess's name etymology implies that the goddess is associated with war, and Simek points out that sacred groves are commonly associated with the Germanic peoples.

== Attestation ==
Baduhenna is solely attested in book 4, chapter 73 of Tacitus's Annals. In chapters 73 and 74 of Annals, Tacitus describes the defeat of the Roman army in ancient Frisia:

Original Latin (1st century CE):

mox compertum a transfugis nongentos Romanorum apud lucum quem Baduhennae vocant pugna in posterum extracta confectos, et aliam quadringentorum manum occupata Cruptoricis quondam stipendiarî villa, postquam proditio metuebatur, mutuis ictibus procubuisse.
74. Clarum inde inter Germanos Frisium nomen, dissimultane Tiberio damna, ne cui bella permitteret.

Church and Brodribb translation (1876):

Soon afterwards it was ascertained from deserters that nine hundred Romans had been cut to pieces in a wood called Baduhenna, after prolonging the fight to the next day, and that another body of four hundred, which had taken possession of the house of one Cruptorix, once a soldier in our pay, fearing betrayal, had perished by mutual slaughter.
74. The Frisian name thus became famous in Germany, and Tiberius kept our losses a secret, not wishing to entrust any one with the war.

== See also ==
- "Isis" of the Suebi, a Germanic goddess mentioned by Tacitus in his Germania
- Nerthus, a Germanic goddess mentioned by Tacitus in his Germania
- Regnator omnium deus, a Germanic god mentioned by Tacitus in his Germania
- Rheda maybe an Anglo-Saxon goddess of war and/or spring mentioned by Bede.
- Tamfana, a Germanic goddess mentioned by Tacitus in his Annals
- "Hold Pade" as suggested as the location of the Baduhennae lucus in Lewis & Short
