= Sessrúmnir =

Hall in Asgard from Norse mythology

In Norse mythology, Sessrúmnir (Old Norse "seat-room" or "seat-roomer") is both the goddess Freyja's hall located in Fólkvangr, a field where Freyja receives half of those who die in battle (Odin takes the other half to Valhalla), and also the name of a ship. Both the hall and the ship are attested in the Prose Edda, written in the 13th century by Snorri Sturluson. Scholarly theories have been proposed regarding a potential relation between the hall and the ship.

== Attestations ==
Sessrúmnir is specifically referred to as a hall in chapter 24 of the Prose Edda book Gylfaginning. After describing Fólkvangr, High tells Gangleri (described as king Gylfi in disguise) that Freyja has the hall Sessrúmnir, and that "it is large and beautiful".

Sessrúmnir is secondly referred to in chapter 20 of the Prose Edda book Skáldskaparmál. In the chapter, means of referring to Freyja are given, including a reference to Sessrúmnir: "possessor of the fallen slain and of Sessrúmnir [...]". Sessrúmnir is referenced a third and final time within a list of ship names in chapter 75.

== Theories ==
Rudolf Simek theorizes that one of the two notions of Sessrúmnir (as a ship or as a hall) may come from a misunderstanding, as the meaning of the name can be understood in both cases as "space with many or roomy seats." In a 2012 paper, Joseph S. Hopkins and Haukur Þorgeirsson propose a connection between Fólkvangr, Sessrúmnir, and numerous stone ships found throughout Scandinavia. According to Hopkins and Haukur, Fólkvangr and Sessrumir together paint an image of a ship and a field, which has broader implications and may connect Freyja to the "Isis" of the Suebi mentioned by Roman senator Tacitus in his first century Germania.

== See also ==
- Rán, a goddess and personification of the sea—the sea may be referred to as 'Rán's Hall'
- Valfreyja, a name appearing in a kenning Njals saga meaning 'lady of the slain' or 'Freyja of the slain'

== General and cited references ==
- Faulkes, Anthony (Trans.) (1995). Edda. Everyman. ISBN 0-460-87616-3
- Hopkins, Joseph S. and Haukur Þorgeirsson (2012). "The Ship in the Field". RMN Newsletter 3, 2011:14-18. University of Helsinki.
- Orchard, Andy (1997). Dictionary of Norse Myth and Legend. Cassell. ISBN 0-304-34520-2
- Simek, Rudolf (2007) translated by Angela Hall. Dictionary of Northern Mythology. D.S. Brewer. ISBN 0-85991-513-1
