= Marcus Simplicinius Genialis =

3rd century Roman governor and military leader

Vir Perfectissimus Marcus Simplicinius Genialis
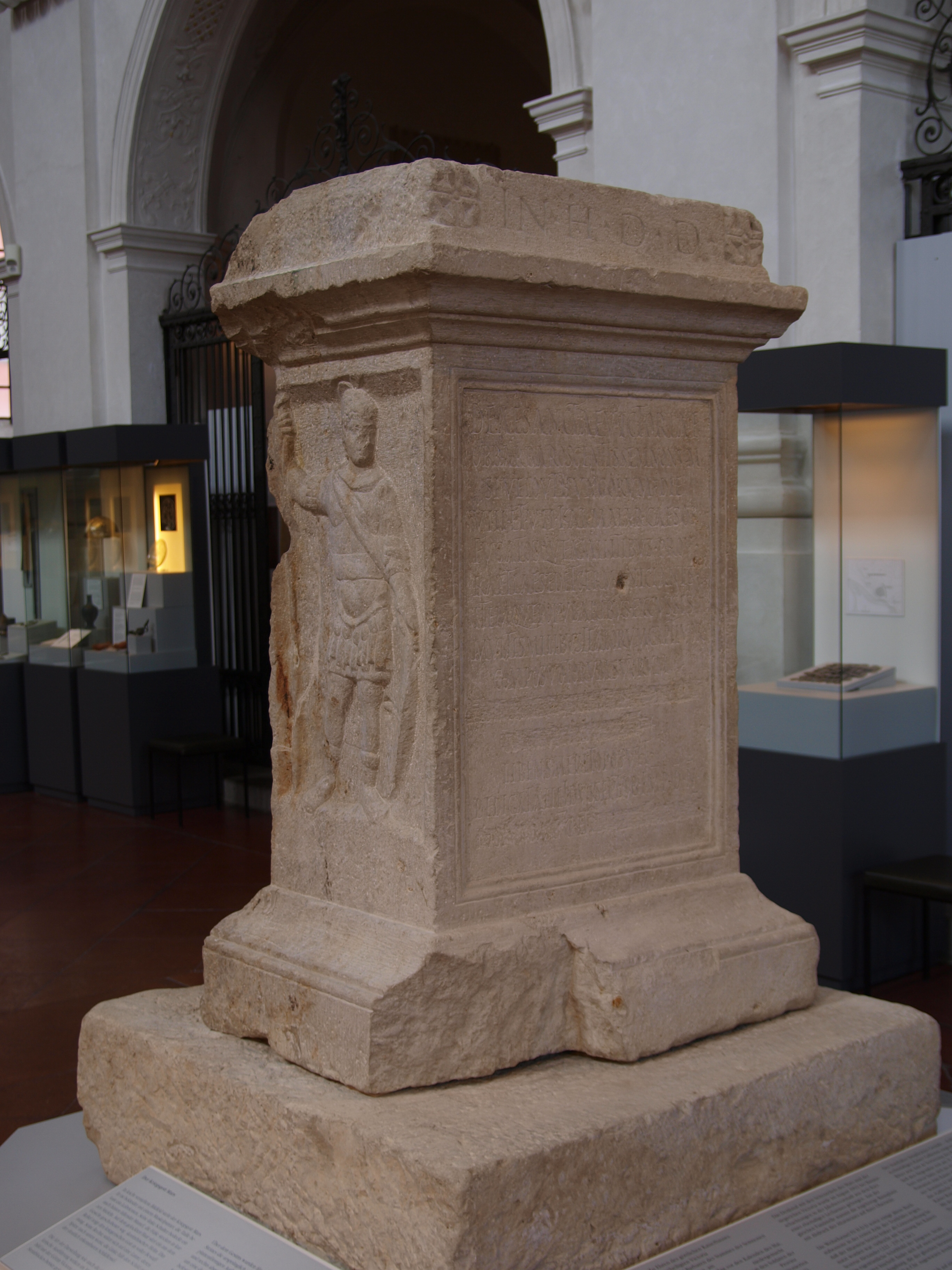
- Augsburg Victory Altar completed after the victory of 260 in Raetia
- Military career
- Allegiance: Roman Empire (until 260), then Gallic Empire (260 - ?)
- Rank: agens vice praesidis (acting governor of Raetia)
- Conflicts: Battle of Mediolanum

Marcus Simplicinius Genialis was a Roman governor and military leader during the third century CE.

He was the governor of Raetia in 260 when he defected to the Gallic Empire and brought the province under the rule of Postumus. He erected the Augsburg Victory Altar in 260 to commemorate the victory over the Semnones.
