= Old High German lullaby =

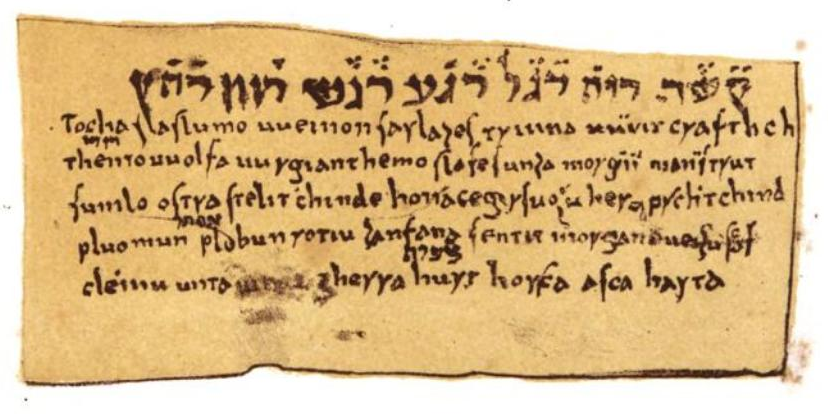
Photographic reproduction of the manuscript as published by Zappert (1859).

The discovery of an Old High German lullaby (Althochdeutsches Schlummerlied) was announced in 1859 by Georg Zappert (1806–1859) of Vienna, a private scholar and collector of medieval literature. Ostensibly a 10th-century poem full of surviving pre-Christian mythology, it is considered a literary forgery of Zappert's by many experts who have commented on it.

== The lullaby ==
According to Zappert, in 1852 he noted some words in Old High German on a strip of parchment glued to the spine of a 15th-century paper manuscript (Hofbibliothek Codex Suppl. No. 1668). Zappert says he purchased the manuscript in August 1858, as the recovering of the strip necessitated the destruction of the manuscript binding. Zappert reports that, once the strip was recovered, it turned out it bore an Old High German poem, apparently a lullaby, in five lines, in a hand of the 9th or 10th century:

1. Tocha slaslumo uueinon sarlazes triuua uuerit craftlicho
2. themo uuolfa uurgianthemo slafes unza morgane manestrut
3. sunilo ostra stelit chinde honacegirsuoziu hera prichitchinde
4. pluomun plobun rotiu zanfana sentit morganeueiziu scaf
5. cleiniu unta einouga herra hurt horsca asca harta

Zappert reads this as seven alliterating verses, as follows:

1. Tocha slafês sliumo / uueinon sar lazzês.
2. Triuua uuerit kraftlicho / themo uuolfa uurgiantemo.
3. slafês unz za morgane / manes trût sunilo.
4. Ostârâ stellit chinde / honak egir suozziu.
5. Hera prichit chinde / pluomun plobun rotun.
6. Zanfana sentit morgane / ueiziu scaf kleiniu,
7. unta Einouga, herra hurt! / horska aska harta.

translated: "(1) Docke, sleep speedily / leave off crying // (2) Triuwa forcefully / fends off the murdering wolf // (3) May you sleep until morning / dear man's son // (4) Ostara for the child leaves / honey and sweet eggs // (5) Hera for the child breaks / flowers blue and red // (6) Zanfana on the morrow sends // white little sheep // (7) and One-Eye, herra hurt, swift, hard spears." Docke is a term of endearment addressing the child. Triuwa is "truth" personified, Ostara is a hypothetical spring goddess, here portrayed as "leaving eggs for the child", which would be a striking attestation of a pagan origin of easter egg customs. Also extremely striking would be the survival of Tanfana, a theonym only attested by Tacitus in the 1st century, in Old High German form. "One-Eye" would be Wotan, also a very striking confirmation of the Eddaic tradition of Odin being one-eyed, otherwise unattested in West Germanic sources.

Preceding the Old High German text is a line in Hebrew, קשת רוח רגל רגע רגש רצון רחץ, a list of seven words from a glossary. On the back of the parchment is another line in Hebrew, חכמה ואדם יפיק תבונה לך אל, a fragment of two verses of Proverbs (the end of 3:13 and the beginning of 6:6). These appear to be pen trials. Based on this Zappert surmises (p. 12) that the manuscript is due to an early German Jew, perhaps a rabbi or physician, recording a lullaby he may have heard from a wetnurse employed in his house.

Some of the vowels of the lullaby are given in the form of Hebrew vowel points.

== Authenticity debate ==
If authentic, the text would afford a rich source for Germanic paganism, giving more detail on the deities mentioned even than the Merseburg Incantations (discovered 1841). Johann Kelle (1860) had scathing criticism for Zappert's analysis, disagreeing with literally every one of Zappert's conclusions and emendations, but did not question the authenticity of the document. Jacob Grimm in Berliner Sitzungsberichte, 1859, 254—58 refers to Zappert's publication as an independent attestation of the name Zanfana, apparently without doubting its authenticity. In fact, Edwards (2002, p. 150) claims that J. Grimm intended to publish a defence of the lullaby, and “stood out from the beginning because of his enthusiastic advocacy of the lullaby”.

But Grohmann (1861) in a 46-page essay examines the poem in detail and concludes that it is clearly a falsification. Since Zappert had died in 1859, he could not defend his position.

Kletke (1867) still considers the text genuine, but the mainstream opinion in the late 19th century and until today remains Grohmann's. Nevertheless, there have been a few 20th-century scholars defending the poem's authenticity (see Diamant 1960, Howard 1976).

Fichtenau (1970) again concludes that without a doubt, the poem is a falsification. Edwards (2002, p. 158) states that from six essays which appeared on the topic of the lullaby during the 20th century, three consider it a forgery, while three declare it as genuine. Edwards himself (p. 161) concludes that the evidence adduced in his essay against the authenticity of the lullaby “points more than one finger of suspicion, but falls short of certainty”.

Arguments in favour of the authenticity:

- Howard (1976, p. 34) argues that the text presupposes some linguistic knowledge which could not have been available to Zappert at the time. He specifically mentions the spelling of the sound e in uuerit with the Hebrew Zeire, which represents a closed /e/-sound. According to Howard, scholars at the time regarded the /e/-sound from i-mutation as open, and a forger would therefore have chosen the Hebrew Segol instead of Zeire.

Arguments against the authenticity:

- According to Fichtenau (1970), Zappert is suspected of having produced other forgeries, too. The text of one of them, an old map of Vienna, shows some striking paleographical similarities to the Old High German lullaby (Edwards 2002, p. 156).
- According to Edwards (p. 160f.), F. Mairinger has investigated the ink of the lullaby and the Hebrew line and concluded that unlike the remaining Hebrew words, they were not executed “in the typical medieval 'Eisengallentinte' with soot admixture”. This points to a forgery. (The parchment and the Hebrew pen trials appear to be medieval, though).
- It is known that the unusual link between Germanic and Hebrew culture manifested by the writing on this piece of parchment was a topic “dear to Zappert's heart” (Edwards 2002, p. 160), being of Jewish origin himself, and this could have provided a motive for a forgery.
- The information given about heathen gods in the lullaby curiously matches some passages in J. Grimm's book Deutsche Mythologie (first published in 1835), where Grimm lamented a lack of sources. This suggests that “Zappert looked for holes in Grimm's Deutsche Mythologie, and sought to plug them.” (Edwards 2002, p. 157).

== See also ==
- Oera Linda Book, a work purported to be an ancient Frisian tome, since considered a hoax
