= Regnator omnium deus =

In Tacitus' work Germania from the year 98, regnator omnium deus (god, ruler of all) was a deity worshipped by the Semnones tribe in a sacred grove. Comparisons have been made between this reference and the poem Helgakviða Hundingsbana II, recorded in the 13th century from earlier traditional sources.

== Germania ==
According to Tacitus:

Of all the Suevians, the Semnones recount themselves to be the most ancient and most noble. The belief of their antiquity is confirmed by religious mysteries. At a stated time of the year, all the several people descended from the same stock, assemble by their deputies in a wood; consecrated by the idolatries of their forefathers, and by superstitious awe in times of old. There by publicly sacrificing a man, they begin the horrible solemnity of their barbarous worship. To this grove another sort of reverence is also paid. No one enters it otherwise than bound with ligatures, thence professing his subordination and meanness, and the power of the Deity there. If he falls down, he is not permitted to rise or be raised, but grovels along upon the ground. And of all their superstition, this is the drift and tendency; that from this place the nation drew their original, that here God, the supreme Governor of the world, resides, and that all things else whatsoever are subject to him and bound to obey him.

== Poetic Edda ==
The description is often compared with a prose paragraph in the Eddic poem Helgakviða Hundingsbana II where a place called Fjöturlundr (grove of fetters) is mentioned:

Helgi obtained Sigrún, and they had sons. Helgi lived not to be old. Dag, the son of Högni, sacrificed to Odin, for vengeance for his father. Odin lent Dag his spear. Dag met with his relation Helgi in a place called Fiöturlund, and pierced him through with his spear. Helgi fell there, but Dag rode to the mountains and told Sigrún what had taken place.

Due to the resemblance between the two texts, some scholars have identified the deity of the Semnones with an early form of Odin. Others suggest an early form of Týr may have been involved, as he is the one to put fetters on Fenrir in Norse mythology, yet Odin is considered the god of binding and fettering of the will. Evidence is insufficient for certain identification.

== See also ==
- Almáttki áss (Old Norse 'all-mighty god'), an unclear deity mentioned along with two pagan gods in the Old Norse Landnámabók
- Baduhenna, a Germanic goddess mentioned by Tacitus in his Annals
- "Isis" of the Suebi, a Germanic goddess mentioned by Tacitus in his Germania
- Nerthus, a Germanic goddess mentioned by Tacitus in his Germania
- Tamfana, a Germanic goddess mentioned by Tacitus in his Annals
