= "Isis" of the Suebi =

Purported Germanic deity

In Roman historian Tacitus's first century CE book Germania, Tacitus describes the veneration of what he deems as an "Isis" of the Suebi. Due to Tacitus's usage of interpretatio romana elsewhere in the text, his admitted uncertainty, and his reasoning for referring to the veneration of an Egyptian goddess by the Suebi—a group of Germanic peoples—scholars have generally held that Tacitus's identification is incorrect, and have debated what goddess Tacitus refers to.

== Attestation ==
In chapter 9 of Germania, Tacitus, employing interpretatio romana (a process in which what an author deems Roman equivalents are listed in place of non-Roman deity names), says that the Suebi principally venerate "Mercury", and that they regard it as sacral to offer him both human and non-human sacrifices on specific dates (unprovided). The Suebi also worship "Mars" and "Hercules", whom they appease by offering animals in a traditional manner. Tacitus adds that a part of the Suebi, however, venerate "Isis", although he admits that he doesn't know how worship of Isis could have been imported:

Latin:

Pars Sueborum et Isidi sacrificat: unde causa et origo peregrino sacro, parum comperi, nisi quod signum ipsum in modum liburnae figuratum docet advectam religionem.

Birley translation:

Part of the Suebi sacrifice to Isis as well. I have little idea what the origin or explanation of this foreign cult is, except that the goddess's emblem, which resembles a light warship, indicates that the goddess came from abroad.

Rives translation:

Some of the Suebi sacrifice also to Isis. I cannot determine the reason and origin of the foreign cult, but her emblem, fashioned in the form of a Liburnian ship, proves that her worship comes from abroad.

== Theories and interpretations ==
While Tacitus's "Mercury", "Mars", and "Hercules" are generally held to refer to Odin, Tyr, and Thor respectively, the identity of "Isis" has been a matter of debate. In his translation of Germania, scholar J. B. Rives comments that while, in Tacitus's time, the cult of Isis was widespread and is well attested in provinces on the border of Germania, Tacitus's identification is problematic because the cult of Isis seems to have spread with Greco-Roman culture. Rives comments that "most scholars believe that Tacitus has misidentified a native Germanic ritual that bore some resemblance to a well-known Isiac ritual that involved a ship [...]".

In a 2012 paper, Joseph S. Hopkins and Haukur Þorgeirsson propose a connection between a Vanir goddess, particularly Freyja, and the ship symbolism of the "Isis" of the Suebi. The two propose that Old Norse texts mentioning Fólkvangr and Sessrúmnir present an image of a 'ship in the field', implying a strong association between Freyja and ship imagery, particularly the stone ships of Scandinavia.

== See also ==
- Baduhenna, a Germanic goddess mentioned by Tacitus in his Annals
- Nerthus, a Germanic goddess mentioned by Tacitus in his Germania
- Regnator omnium deus, a Germanic god mentioned by Tacitus in his Germania
- Tamfana, a Germanic goddess mentioned by Tacitus in his Annals
- Idis (Germanic), a Germanic divine female being, cognate to the North Germanic dísir
- Dísablót, a North Germanic sacrifice holiday held in honour of dísir
