= Augsburg Victory Altar =

Roman altar

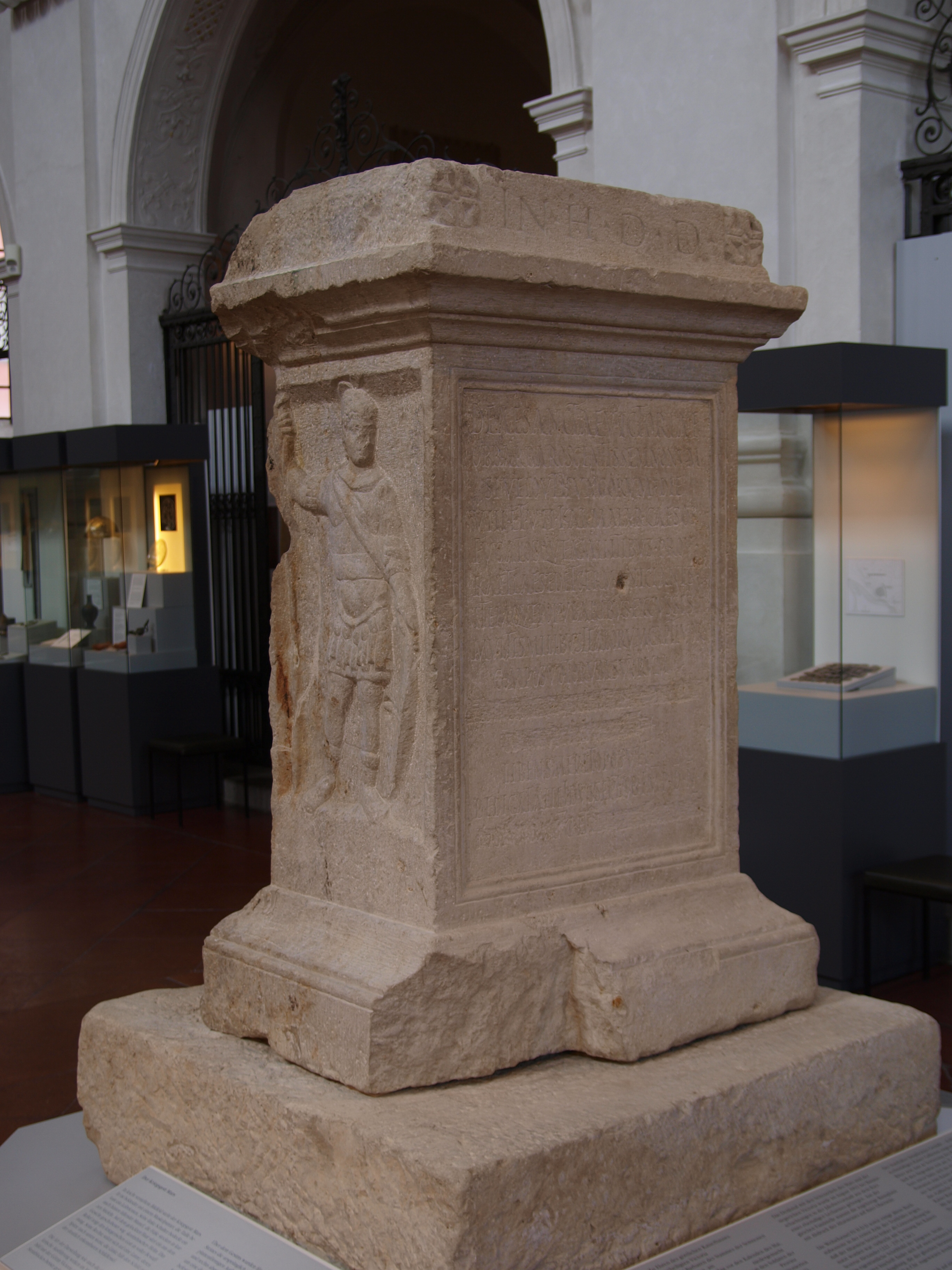
Augsburg Victory Altar

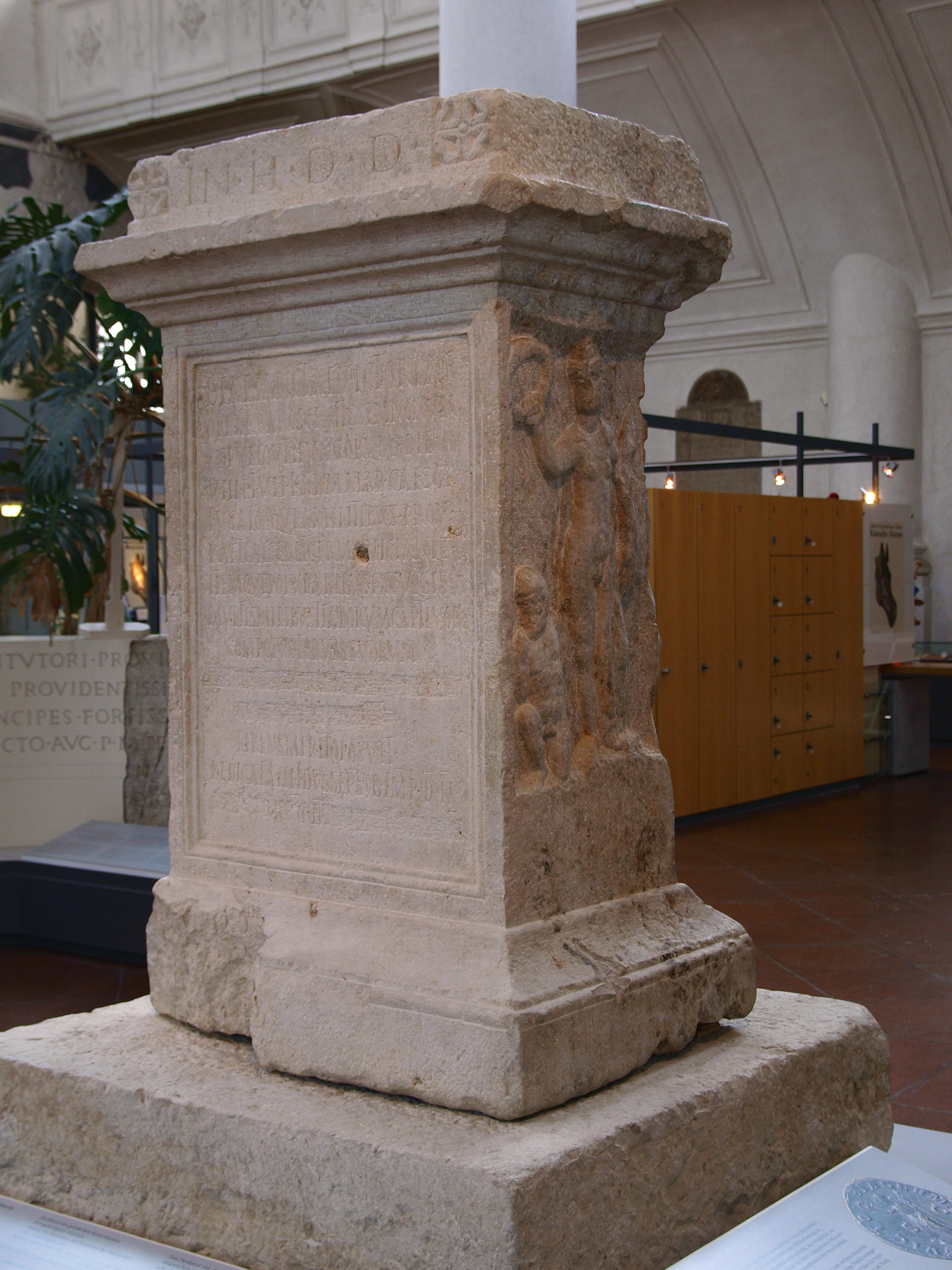
Augsburg Victory Altar

The Augsburg Victory Altar (German: Augsburger Siegesaltar) is the name given to a Roman altar of the victory goddess Victoria, which was set up on the occasion of the victory of a Roman army over the tribe of the Juthungi near the Rhaetian provincial capital Augusta Vindelicorum. The mention of the rebel emperor Postumus dates the creation of the altar to 11 September 260. The stone is kept in the Römisches Museum Augsburg.

== Altar and inscription ==
The altar, made of Jura limestone, is 1.56 metres (5.1 ft) high, 0.79 metres (2.6 ft) wide, and 0.75 metres (2.5 ft) deep. It was found in 1992 by construction workers in Jakobvorstadt, Gänsbühl, Augsburg, in a former arm of the Lech, almost 400 m outside the former Roman city area. It is possible that it was originally displayed in the immediate area of the find location at a river crossing. The stone probably also had a statue of the goddess Victoria, but this is now lost; the base plate survives, however (in the same place).

As common in this period, it was a recycled monument. The original dedication, dating to the time of Severus Alexander (222–235), managed to survive above the actual inscription, hidden under a lipped stone lid, as were working marks on the side corners of the cornice.

The older inscription:

Latin	English
In h(onorem) d(omus) d(ivinae) / [pro sal(ute) imp(eratoris)] Sev[er]i / [Alexandri Aug(usti)]	In h(onour) of the d(ivine) h(ouse) / [for the hea(lth) of the Emp(eror)] Sev[er]us [Alexander Aug(ustus)]

The later inscription:

Latin	English
Deae sanctae Victoriae / ob barbaros gentis Semnonum / sive Iouthungorum die / VIII et VII Kal(endarum) Maiar(um) caesos / fugatosque a militibus prov(inciae) / Raetiae sed et Germanicianis / itemque popularibus excussis / multis milibus Italorum captivor(um) / compos votorum suorum / [[M(arcus) Simplicinius Genialis v(ir) p(erfectissimus) a(gens) v(ices) p(raesidis)]]/ [[cum eodem exercitu]] / libens merito posuit / dedicata III Idus Septemb(res) Imp(eratore) d(omino) n(ostro) / [[Postumo Au]]g(usto) et [[Honoratiano co(n)s(ulibus)]].	To the holy goddess Victory, on account of barbarians of the race of the Semnones or Iuthungi killed on the eighth and seventh days before the Kalends of May and put to flight by soldiers of the province of Raetia as well as Germani and locals, freeing many thousands of Italian captives; in fulfillment of his vow, [ Marcus Simplicinius Genialis, vir perfectissimus acting for the praeses with his army] happily and deservedly erected this altar, dedicated three days before the Ides of September when the Emperor, our lord [Postumus Au]gustus, and [Honoratianus were consuls]

Lines 10 and 11 with the names of the Rhaetian governor and the ruler of the Gallic Empire were later erased. The name of the usurper Postumus seems to have been made illegible using a chisel, while the remaining letters of these lines were simply scratched out. However, enough survives for the original text to be fully reconstructed.

== Historical context ==
In autumn/winter of 259 the Juthungi, including the Suebi, crossed the Limes Germanicus and invaded Italy (Failure of the Limes). While Emperor Gallienus managed to defeat the German invasion at Mediolanum in 260, the Juthungi had already stopped further north with thousands of Italian captives and copious booty. The inscription of the victory altar indicates that these were met by regular Roman troops and a provincial levy near the Rhaetian provincial capital, and defeated in a two-day battle (24 and 25 April). Until the discovery of the altar, this event was not known.

In addition to the record of this event, the inscription also allows further clarification of the expansion and chronology of the so-called Gallic Empire. Until its discovery, no source indicated that the province of Rhaetia was a part of it; apparently the break-away empire was also established earlier than had previously been assumed.

This battle took place in spring, when Emperor Gallienus was still the undisputed and sole ruler of the Empire. But he was not named on the altar since Postumus had already declared himself emperor by the time the inscription was produced in autumn. It was originally assumed that Postumus' usurpation took place only in autumn of 260, but Postumus must have rebelled from his authority already some time before September of this year, probably in June or July. Naturally, after his proclamation a reference to Gallienus was impossible, even though we still don't know when Genialis changed sides.

Nevertheless, the political situation changed rapidly. Probably in 262/3, but by 265 at the latest, the Rhaetians were back under the control of Gallienus. At this point followers and supporters of Postumus fell under the damnatio memoriae. The name of Genialis and the consuls as well as the mention of the army were erased from the inscription; probably they were only covered with stucco and remained readable.

The composition of the partially Roman army at this battle is typical of the period. This force, led by Genialis, an officer from the equites, lacks any regular units of the Rhaetian provincial army, such as the legio III Italica (which had been stationed at Castra Regina since c.170). Instead the contingent was formed (perhaps rapidly) of Germaniciani (members of units of Upper Germania), milites provinciae Raetiae (presumably auxiliary troops) and populares ("locals"), which might mean just armed civilians (perhaps veterans). Perhaps the latter were a kind of citizen militia, raised from the residents of the provincial capital and its hinterland and therefore highly motivated to defeat the German raiders.

== Bibliography ==
- Lothar Bakker. "Das Siegesdenkmal zur Juthungenschlacht des Jahres 260 n. Chr. aus Augusta Vindelicum." In Das Archäologische Jahr in Bayern. Jahrgang 1992 (1993), pp. 116–119.
- Lothar Bakker. "Raetien unter Postumus. Das Siegesdenkmal einer Juthungenschlacht im Jahre 260 n. Chr. aus Augsburg." In Germania 71, 1993, pp. 369–386.
- Lothar Bakker. "Der Augsburger Siegesaltar." In Badisches Landesmuseum of Karlsruhe (Ed.), Imperium Romanum. Römer, Christen, Alamannen. Die Spätantike am Oberrhein. Theiss, Stuttgart 2005, ISBN 3-8062-1954-0, S. 96–101.
- Lothar Bakker. "Objektbeschreibung." In Alexander Demandt (Ed.), Konstantin der Große. Exhibition catalogue of Rheinisches Landesmuseum Trier. von Zabern, Mainz 2007, ISBN 978-3-8053-3688-8, Catalogue No. I.3.2 (on the CD-ROM).
- Egon Schallmayer (Ed.). Der Augsburger Siegesaltar – Zeugnis einer unruhigen Zeit. Saalburgmuseum Bad Homburg v. d. H. 1995, ISBN 3-931267-01-6 (= Saalburg-Schriften 2).
