= Nijeholtpade =

- Village
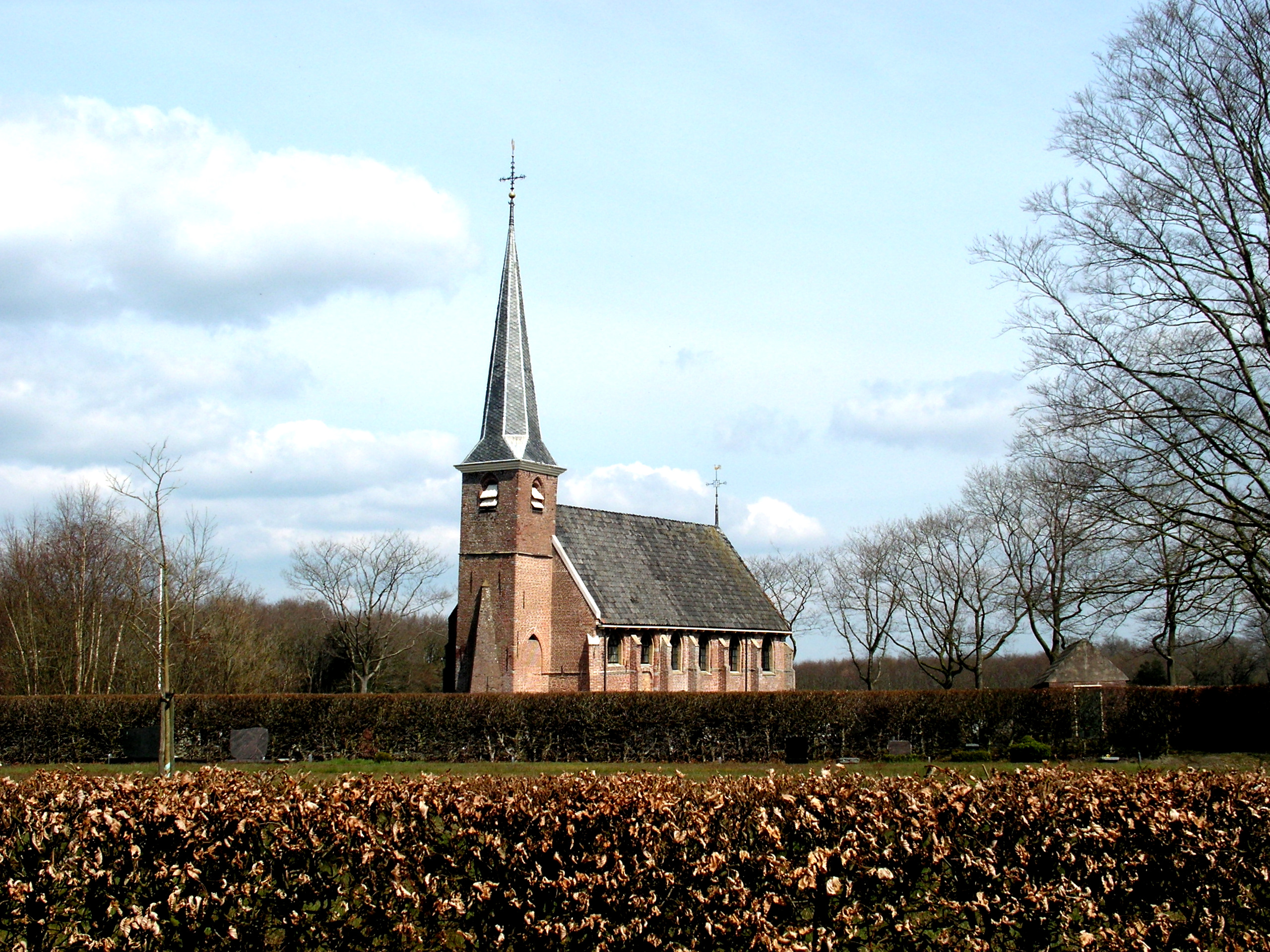
- Nicolas Church

- Flag

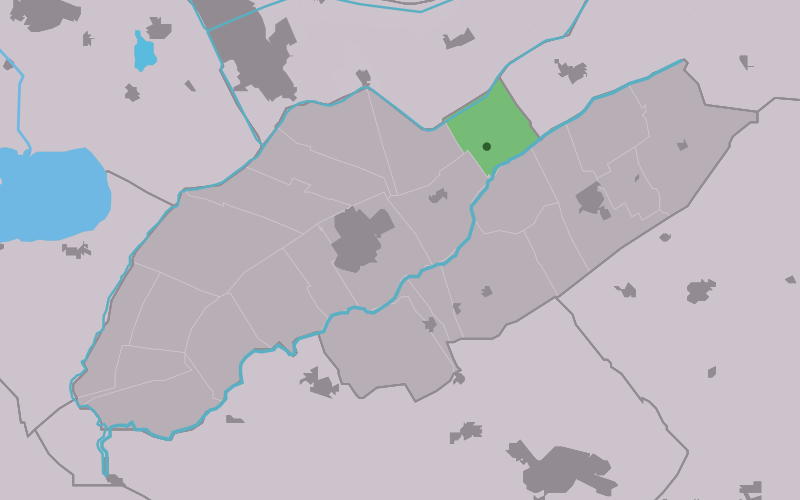
- Location in Weststellingwerf municipality

- Location in the Netherlands Nijeholtpade (Netherlands)
- Country: Netherlands
- Province: Friesland
- Municipality: Weststellingwerf

Area
  - Total: 8.65 km^{2} (3.34 sq mi)
- Elevation: 1.9 m (6.2 ft)

Population (2021)
  - Total: 495
  - Density: 57.2/km^{2} (148/sq mi)
- Time zone: UTC+1 (CET)
  - Summer (DST): UTC+2 (CEST)
- Postal code: 8475
- Dialing code: 0561

Nijeholtpade (West Frisian: Nijeholtpea) is a village in Weststellingwerf in the province of Friesland, the Netherlands. It had a population of around 485 in 2017.

The village was first mentioned in 1399 as Nyeholepat, which means "new low-lying path". Nije (new) has been added to distinguish from Oldeholtpade.

The Dutch Reformed church was built in 1525 and has a bell tower. The church was a replacement of a wooden church.

Nijeholtpade was home to 150 people in 1840.
