= Neorxnawang =

Old English noun used in Anglo-Saxon literature

Neorxnawang (Old English pronunciation: [ˈneo̯rksnɑˌwɑŋɡ], also Neorxenawang and Neorxnawong) is an Old English noun used to translate the Christian concept of paradise in Anglo-Saxon literature. Scholars propose that the noun originally derives from Germanic mythology, referring to a "heavenly meadow" or place without toil or worries.

== Etymology ==
While the second half of the word, -wang, is widely acknowledged to mean 'field' (and its cognate 𐍅𐌰𐌲𐌲𐍃 waggs appears for 'paradise' in Gothic), scholars have yet to reach an agreement regarding the first element's meaning – though at least a dozen attempts to interpret it have been made. Scholar Rudolf Simek states that it is possible to consider the term as a Proto-Germanic term for 'Asgard' or 'Other World' due to the noun's unclear meaning, that Christian authors who used it seemed to have a poor understanding of it as well, and that it corresponds with the North Germanic terms Iðavöllr (possibly 'field of activity' or 'the continually renewing, rejuvenating field') and Glæsisvellir ('the shining fields').

19th century scholar Jacob Grimm observes that etymological connections have been proposed between Norn and Neorxnawang, but says that the theory raises etymological issues and other problems: "The A. gen. pl. neorxana, which only occurs in 'neorxena wong' = paradisus, has been proposed, but the abbreviation would be something unheard of, and even the nom. sing. neorxe or neorxu at variance with norn; besides, the Parcae are nowhere found connected with paradise."

Late 19th and early 20th century philologist James Bright proposes that neorxena- derives from the phrase ne wyrcan, meaning 'no working'.

In a 1973 article, Alan K. Brown proposes that neorxena- is an artificial distortion of OE grœ̄ne (alternative form of grēne) 'green' using then in-vogue 8th century literary tricks of reverse spelling and isolated rune use, in this case the Elder Fuþark and the Anglo-Saxon Fuþorc rune ᚷ (Proto-Germanic *gebu, Old English ġifu) 'gift', to mark the end & beginning of said reversal stemming from the left-to-right-or-right-to-left freedom of runic writing, suggesting an original *Grœ̄n(e)nawang, meaning 'green field'. He then suggests an entirely Christian origin of the term rather than a pre-Christian one, stating "Cryptic names for Paradise, and its interpretation with 'green,' are found in early Insular Latin." and points to the Old Saxon epic poem Heliand using the term 'grôni uuang' as a noteworthy kenning for Paradise, and similar phrases in Genesis A and Guthlac A to suggest the term originally being created simply as a semantic loan of Latin Paradisus.

In a 1985 paper, Jane Roberts expounds her interpretation of nēo-rixena as "corpse-rushes".

In a 2012 paper, Joseph S. Hopkins and Haukur Þorgeirsson propose a connection between Old Norse Fólkvangr, an afterlife location overseen by the goddess Freyja, and a variety of other Germanic words referring to the afterlife that contain extensions of Proto-Germanic *wangaz (including Old English Neorxnawang and Gothic waggs), potentially stemming from a concept of a '*wangaz of the dead' in Proto-Germanic mythology.

== See also ==
- Muspilli, an Old High German poem where pagan vocabulary and Christian concepts mingle
- Þrúðvangr, the field of the god Thor
