= Eutropius =

Eutropius (Ancient Greek: Εὐτρόπιος, romanized: Eutrópios, lit. 'good manner') is a Greek personal name. It may refer to:

- Eutropius (historian), a fourth century Roman historian, and author of an abridgement of Roman history
- Eutropius (consul 399), a Roman consul put to death by Emperor Arcadius in AD 399
- Eutropius (fl. mid-5th century or earlier), an Ephesian who paved his city's streets - see Head of Eutropius
- Saint Eutropius of Saintes, a first- or third-century bishop, martyred while attempting to convert the Gauls
- Saint Eutropius the Lector, a fifth-century lector in Constantinople, martyred for supporting John Chrysostom
- Saint Eutropius of Orange, fifth-century bishop of Arausio, now Orange in France
- Saint Eutropius of Valencia, a Spanish bishop of the late sixth and early seventh century
