= Tamfana =

Germanic goddess

In Germanic paganism, Tamfana is a goddess. The destruction of a temple dedicated to the goddess is recorded by Roman senator Tacitus to have occurred during a massacre of the Germanic Marsi by forces led by Roman general Germanicus. Scholars have analyzed the name of the goddess (without reaching consensus) and have advanced theories regarding her role in Germanic paganism.

== Attestations ==
In book 1, chapters 50 and 51 of his Annals, Tacitus says that forces led by Germanicus massacred the men, women, and children of the Marsi during the night of a festival near the location of a temple dedicated to Tanfana:

Original Latin (first century CE):

iuvit nox sideribus inlustris, ventumque ad vicos Marsorum et circumdatae stationes stratis etiam tum per cubilia properterque mensas, nullo metu, non antepositis vigiliis: adea cuncta incuria disiecta erant, neque belli timor, ac ne pax quidem nisi linguida et soluta inter temultentos.
51. Caesar avidas legiones, quo latior populatio foret, quattuor in cuneos dispertit; quinquaginta milium spatium ferro flammisque pervastat. non sexus, non aetas miserationem attulit: profana simul et sacra et celeberrimum illis gentibus templum quod Tamfanae vocabant solo aequantur. sine vulnere milites, qui semisomnos, inermos aut palantis ceciderant. excivit ea caedes Bructeros, Tubantes, Usipetes; saltusque per quos exercitui regressus insedere.

Church and Brodribb translation (1876):

They were helped by a night of bright starlight, reached the villages of the Marsi, and threw their pickets round the enemy, who even then were stretched on beds or at their tables, without the least fear, or any sentries before their camp, so complete was their careless and disorder; and of war indeed there was no apprehension. Peace it certainly was not—merely the languid and heedless ease of half-intoxicated people.

51. Cæsar, to spread devastation more widely, divided his eager legions into four columns, and ravaged a space of fifty miles with fire and sword. Neither sex nor age moved his compassion. Everything, sacred or profane, the temple too of Tamfana, as they called it, the special resort of all those tribes, was levelled to the ground. There was not a wound among our soldiers, who cut down a half asleep, an unarmed, or a straggling foe. The Bructeri, Tubantes, and Usipetes, were roused by this slaughter, and beset the forest passes through which the army had to return.

There is no undisputed testimony of this goddess besides the passage in Tacitus. An inscription Tamfanae sacrum was found in Terni, but is considered a falsification by Pyrrhus Ligorius. She is also mentioned, as Zamfana, in the supposed Old High German lullaby, which was accepted by Jacob Grimm, but is considered now by most experts a probable forgery.

== Theories and interpretation ==
Since fana is Latin for "temple", it has been suggested that the name Tamfana was derived from a temple dedicated to a god Tan. The 16th-century scholar Justus Lipsius thought it concerned a Celtic word tan, meaning "fire". Other scholars thought the word was derived from German Tanne "pine tree", or that it might mean "collective." The 19th-century antiquarian Thomas Smith believed it was a Wotanfana, a temple dedicated to Wodan. Amateur etymologies were rejected by Grimm, among others; he called the name "certainly German," the -ana ending being also found in Hludana, Bertana, Rapana, and Madana.

The passage is one of few to contradict Tacitus' own statement in Germania that the Germanic tribes did not have temples. The historian Wilhelm Engelbert Giefers proposed 1883 that Tanfana derived from tanfo, cognate with Latin truncus, and referred to a grove on the site of the Eresburg, related to the Irminsul.

Many suggestions have been made since then about the goddess' name and nature. Grimm was unable to interpret it, but suggested variously that it was connected to Stempe, a name of Berchte, that she was named for an association with a sieve, and, based on the now discredited lullaby, that her name meant "bountiful, merciful." Based on folklore and toponymy, Friedrich Woeste proposed that the name was cognate with German zimmern and meant "builder" or "nourisher"; based on the season at which the festival and the Roman attack took place, Karl Müllenhoff proposed she was a goddess of harvest plenty, properly *Tabana, cognate with Greek words for "expenditure" and (hypothetically) "unthrifty"; others added Icelandic and Norwegian words for "fullness, swelling," "to stuff," and "large meal." These ideas are considered outdated by modern folklore scholarship.

In the Dutch city of Oldenzaal the 19th-century antiquarian and school principal Jan Weeling developed the idea that the temple was located in the district of Twente, where the Tubanti as allies of the Marsi had been situated. Based on contemporary legends he located the Tamfana-temple on the slope of the 85 m Tankenberg, a moraine hill east of Enschede, where he took the initiative to place a memorial stone in the 1840s. He also claimed that a heavy boulder with ceremonial functions in the centre of town ("de Groote Steen") originally stemmed from the supposed temple, but was moved into the city around 1710. A local spring might also date from prehistoric times. These ideas were endorsed in 1929 by the archivist A.G. de Bruyn, who studied Oldenzaal folklore. De Bruyn returned to the original idea of splitting the name into Tan and fana. on toponymic grounds. He found extra proof in the seal of the neighbouring baily of Ommen from 1336, depicting the patron saint Brigid of Kildare holding a palm branch, and accompanied by a lion, an eagle, and an eight-pointed star, apparently representing the sun. According to De Bruyn, the woman depicted on the seal was holding a fir tree, and he speculated that she depicted a moon or a mother deity, possibly related to the Carthaginian goddess Tanit.

De Bruyn's speculations were not endorsed by professional historians. They gained renewed popularity by a recent book by Rudi Klijnstra, who connected local folklore with New age-ideas about Mother goddesses.

Rudolf Simek notes that an autumnal festival aligns with Old Norse attestations of the dísablót, a celebration of the dísir, female beings with parallels to the West Germanic cult of the Matres and Matronae. Simek says that Tamfana is perhaps best considered in the context of the widespread veneration of the Germanic Matres and Matronae.

== See also ==
- Baduhenna, a Germanic goddess mentioned by Tacitus in his Annals
- "Isis" of the Suebi, a Germanic goddess mentioned by Tacitus in his Germania
- Nerthus, a Germanic goddess mentioned by Tacitus in his Germania
- Regnator omnium deus, a Germanic god mentioned by Tacitus in his Germania
