= Georg Zappert =

Hungarian historian and archaeologist

Georg Zappert (7 December 1806 in Óbuda – 23 November 1859 in Vienna) was a Hungarian historian and archaeologist.

The son of well-to-do parents, Zappert was educated at the Pest gymnasium and the University of Vienna. He began the study of medicine, but relinquished it after renouncing Judaism for Roman Catholicism in 1829, then taking up theology. This too he was forced to abandon in the second year, owing to deafness caused by a severe illness; and after this disappointment, which he felt keenly, he devoted himself to what became his life work, namely, the study of the Middle Ages.

He led a retired life in Vienna. He foretold the time of his death to the minute three days before it occurred; there have been in his family several cases of similar premonition. The Imperial Academy of Sciences elected him corresponding member on July 28, 1851.

Zappert published: "Gravure en Bois du XII. Siècle" (Vienna, 1837 et seq.); "Vita B. Petri Acotanti" (ib. 1839); and the following memoirs: "Ueber Antiquitätenfunde im Mittelalter" (in "Sitzungsberichte der Kaiserlichen Akademie der Wissenschaften," Nov., 1850); "Epiphania, ein Beitrag zur-Christlichen Kunstarchäologie" (ib. xxi. 291-372); "Ueber Badewesen in Mittelalterlicher und Späterer Zeit" (in "Archiv für Kunde Oesterreichischer Geschichtsquellen," xxi. 5); "Ueber Sogenannte Verbrüderungsbücher in Nekrologien im Mittelalter" (in "Sitzungsberichte der Kaiserlichen Akademie der Wissenschaften," x. 417-463, xi. 5-183); "Ueber ein für den Jugendunterricht des Kaisers Max I. Abgefasstes Lateinisches Gesprächsbüchlein" (ib. xxviii. 193-280); etc.

== See also ==
- Old High German lullaby
