= Head of Eutropius =

Ancient Roman bust

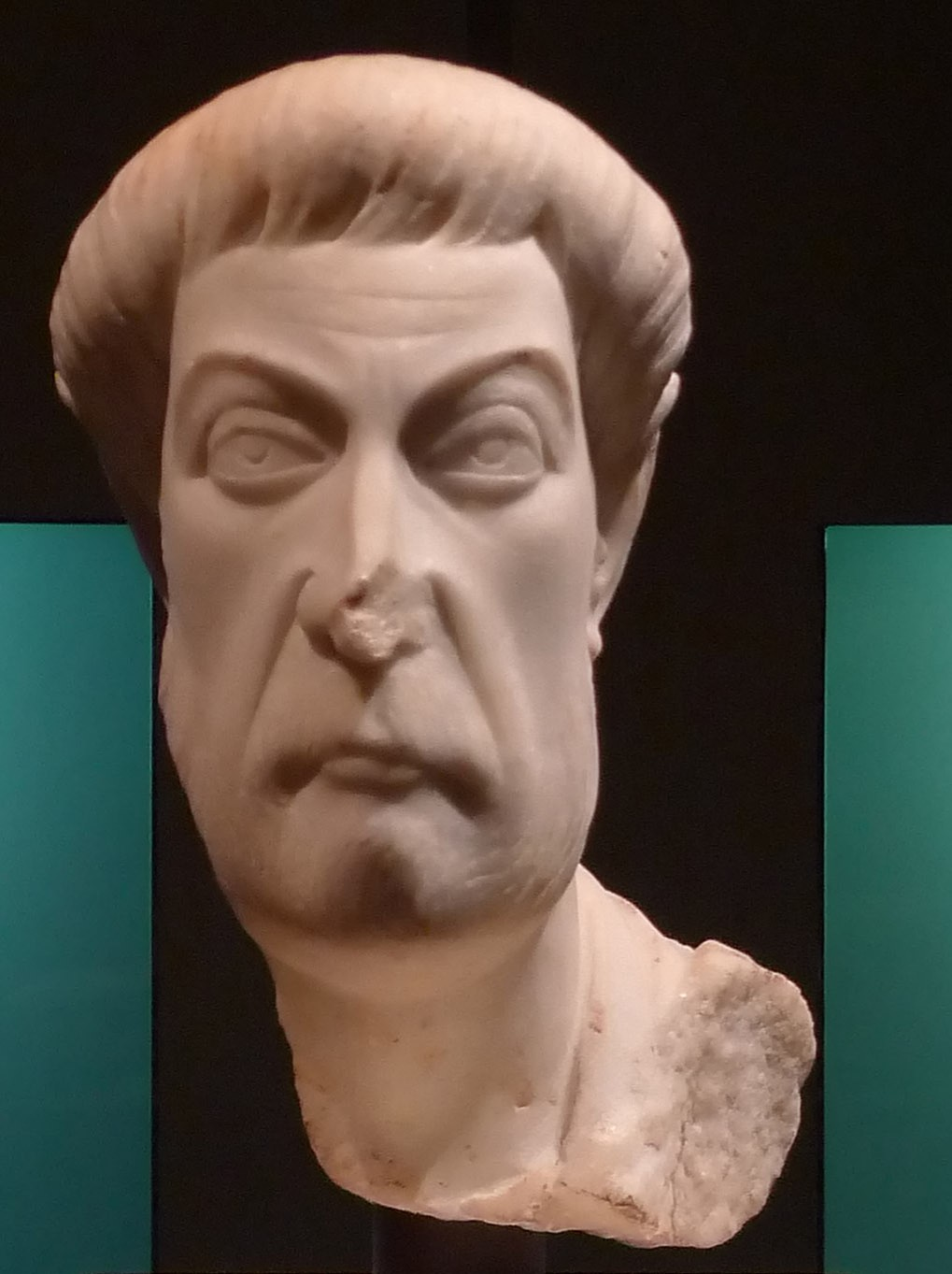
- Material: Marble
- Height: 30.5 cm
- Created: Mid-5th century
- Discovered: Ephesus
- Present location: Kunsthistorisches Museum
- Culture: Roman

The Head of Eutropius is a mid-5th century marble bust. Discovered in Ephesus, it is now in the Kunsthistorisches Museum in Vienna.

The subject of the bust can be identified as Eutropios because of an inscription on a console found in the direct proximity of the bust. This Eutropios was a native of Ephesos and supervised the building of the marble street, on which the head of Eutropius was found. His activity makes it probable that he was a proconsul Asiae. He is not to be confused with the historian and official Eutropius, who was also a proconsul Asiae, but was not born in Ephesos, but in the West, or with Eutropius, the consul of 399, who has nothing whatsoever to do with this Eutropios or the bust.

The style of the bust is that of studios in Ephesus or Aphrodisias, which during the 5th century produced more intensely expressive works influenced by the classicising style of Theodosian art. It also marks a late phase in the theme of bearded philosophers' heads which originated in 5th century BC Athens, all with a fixed and intense gaze and wavy flowing hair. The excavation context and the work's style both place it between around 425 and 450.
