= Oldeholtpade =

- Village
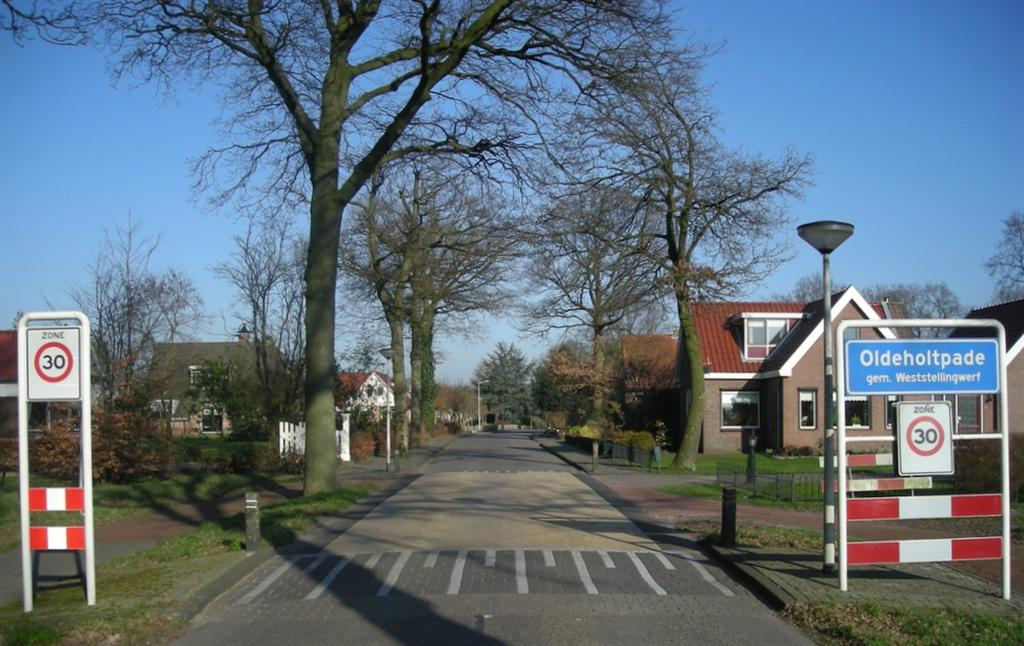
- Oldeholtpade

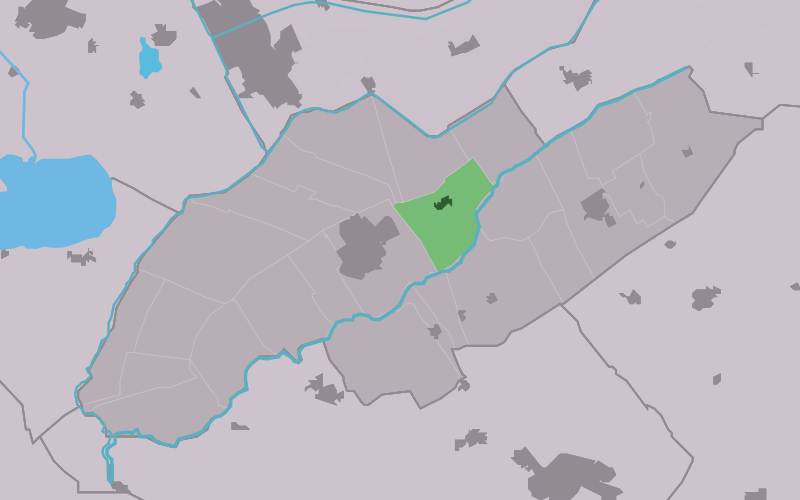
- Location in Weststellingwerf municipality

- Location in the Netherlands Oldeholtpade (Netherlands)
- Coordinates: 52°53′34″N 6°2′58″E
- Country: Netherlands
- Province: Friesland
- Municipality: Weststellingwerf

Area
  - Total: 9.89 km^{2} (3.82 sq mi)
- Elevation: 1.7 m (5.6 ft)

Population (2021)
  - Total: 1,045
  - Density: 106/km^{2} (274/sq mi)
- Time zone: UTC+1 (CET)
  - Summer (DST): UTC+2 (CEST)
- Postal code: 8474
- Dialing code: 0561

Oldeholtpade (West Frisian: Aldeholtpea) is a village in Weststellingwerf in the province of Friesland, the Netherlands. It had a population of around 1,020 in 2017.

The village was first mentioned in 1204 as "Holenpathe juxta Liennam1", and means "old low-lying path". Olde (old) has been added to distinguish from Nijeholtpade. Oldeholtpade is a road village which developed along the Wolvega to Oosterwolde road. The Dutch Reformed church was built in 1545 to replace a church from 1204. The tower was built in 1608.

Oldeholtpade was home to 407 people in 1840.

== Gallery ==
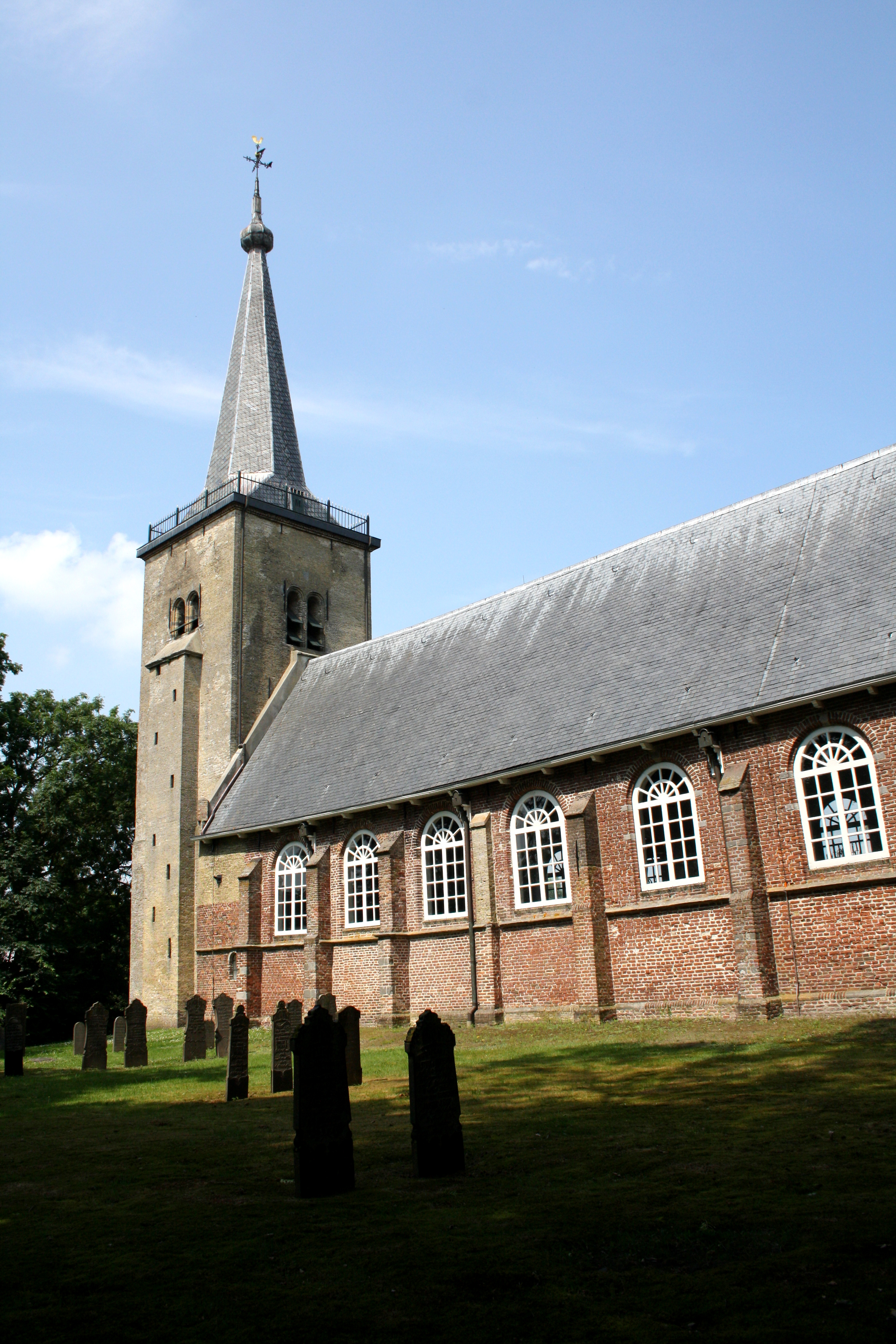
Stephanus Church
