= RMN Newsletter =

University of Helsinki journal

RMN Newsletter is a peer-reviewed and open access academic journal published on a bi-annual basis by the University of Helsinki’s Department of Folklore Studies. Published in both digital and print editions, RMN Newsletter covers topics relevant to folkloristics, linguistics, history, archaeology, and philology, especially in the areas of Germanic studies, Finno-Ugric studies, and Baltic studies. The publication places particular emphasis on what the journal refers to as "retrospective methods", a research method that compares material recorded in differing periods.

Since its inception in December 2010, the journal has been edited by Frog, a University of Helsinki docent. RMN Newsletter originated as a development of the Retrospective Methods Network, a coalition of academics who launched the journal at a conference for the organization, New Focus on Retrospective Methods (September 13–14, 2010).
