= Azar =

- Native name: أذر (Persian); قوس (Dari); Sermawez (Kurdish); Озар / Қавс (Tajik)
- Calendar: Solar Hijri calendar
- Month number: 9
- Number of days: 30
- Season: Autumn
- Gregorian equivalent: November–December

Azar (Persian: آذر, Persian pronunciation: [ɒːˈzæɾ]) is the ninth month of the Solar Hijri calendar, the official calendar of Iran and Afghanistan. Azar has 30 days. It begins on 22 November and ends on 21 December in the Gregorian calendar. Azar corresponds to the Tropical Astrological month of Sagittarius.

Azar is the third month of autumn, and is followed by Dey.

The name is derived from Atar, the Zoroastrian concept of holy fire.

== Events ==
- 5 – 1296 – the National Hockey League (NHL), the successor to the National Hockey Association (NHA), is founded. Its first games were held on 27 Azar.
- 9 – 1297 – Union of Transylvania with Romania
- 6 – 1306 – Macy's New York employees march on Thanksgiving Day, making this parade a precursor to the modern day Macy's Thanksgiving Day Parade.
- 16 – 1320 – Bombing of Pearl Harbor, beginning the Pacific War
- 17 – 1320 – President Franklin Roosevelt delivers his Day of Infamy speech to Congress, urging it to declare war against Japan
- 25 – 1368 – Romanian Revolution begins with the police attack at an anti-government rally in Timișoara.
- 20 – 1372 – Highland Towers tragedy in Malaysia
- 6 – 1387 – Mumbai attacks

== Deaths ==
- 1 – 1342 — John F. Kennedy, 35th President of the United States

== Observances ==
- Thanksgiving Day (United States) – 1st Thursday of Azar
- Black Friday in the United States (shopping holiday, also marked in most other countries) – 1st Friday of Azar
- Small Business Saturday in the United States – 1st Saturday of Azar
- Cyber Monday – 2nd Monday of Azar
- Giving Tuesday – 2nd Tuesday of Azar
- Small Business Saturday (UK) – 2nd Saturday of Azar
- Anniversary of the formation of the National Hockey League – 5 or 6 Azar
- Azarnegan and Great Union Day (Romania) – 10 Azar
- Iranian Students' Day – 16 Azar
- Conception of the Theotokos – 16 or 17 Azar (Catholics and some Protestants), 17 or 18 Azar (Orthodox)
- Pearl Harbor Day – 17 or 18 Azar
- Victory Day (Bangladesh) – 25–26 Azar
- Black Friday in the United Kingdom – Last Friday of Azar, may be occasionally celebrated on the first Friday of Dey to match the date in the Gregorian calendar (held every last Friday before Christmas in the Gregorian)
- United States Space Force Birthday – 29–30 Azar
- Yaldā Night – 30 Azar
