= Super Saturday =

Last Saturday before Christmas; major Christmas-shopping day in the US

- Observed by: United States and Poland
- Type: Commercial
- Celebrations: Shopping
- Date: Last Saturday before Christmas Eve (United States) or Christmas (Poland)
- 2025 date: December 20
- 2026 date: December 19
- 2027 date: December 18
- Frequency: Annual
- Related to: Christmas Eve and Christmas

Super Saturday or Panic Saturday is the last Saturday before Christmas or Christmas Eve, and is a major day of revenue for American retailers, marking the end of the shopping season which begins on Black Friday. Super Saturday targets last-minute shoppers. Typically the day is ridden with one-day sales in an effort to accrue more revenue than any other day in the Christmas and holiday season. The date is slightly more likely to fall on December 22, 19, or 17 (58 in 400 years each), than on December 21 or 20 (57), and slightly less likely to occur on December 23 or 18 (56). On years when Christmas falls on a Sunday, Super Saturday is officially on December 17 instead of December 24 even though the last Saturday before Christmas is December 24.

== Sales ==
Super Saturday typically nets approximately $15 billion in retail sales. To compete with each other, stores offer significant discounts and extend store hours in an attempt to attract customers and drive impulse buying.

Super Saturday accounts for a significant portion of the holiday sales for retail stores. In 2006, a study determined that sales between December 21 and 24 accounted for 13.6 percent of holiday sales. Some businesses do as much as 60 percent of their sales on this day.

In an effort to attract customers, stores often extend their hours during these crucial days of the retail season. Some stores go as far as to leave their stores open all day long until Christmas Eve in hopes that customers will take the extra time during off-peak hours to both review alternative options and to spread out workloads for cashiers. Because stores predict double or triple their typical customer turnout on Super Saturday, many increase their staffing during these critical days to be able to handle the demand.

== Shoppers ==
The day typically nets a significant amount of revenue for retailers because of the demand by shoppers. 2009 reports indicated that by the middle of December, more than half of all shoppers in the United States still had more holiday shopping to do. Some experts predicted that approximately 40% of consumers hadn't started their holiday shopping by Super Saturday in 2009, with some customers citing full-time jobs as impeding their access to stores earlier in the year. Cathy Bergh from The Christmas House notes that the day is significant because it is "the last chance [for shoppers] to get out and do their shopping."

Some shoppers, however, intentionally wait for Super Saturday to finish their shopping due to the availability of discounts. Alternative reasons for waiting until the final Saturday to make holiday purchases include ensuring that purchases are within budget. Other customers choose to do their shopping early in an attempt to avoid the long lines and large crowds associated with the retail holiday.

Unlike Black Friday, online shopping does not typically infringe upon retail stores' access to customers. Due to Super Saturday's proximity to Christmas, shoppers are typically reluctant to venture online for deals, as purchases may not be able to arrive in time for the holiday. However, this is not always the case. If customers are unable to gain access to the stores, like what happened during the North American blizzard of 2009, customers who have little time left to buy their gifts may be forced online.

== Other usages ==
Super Saturday can also be used for any Saturday where a large number of related events are held. For example, in the context of the Eurovision Song Contest the Saturday on which most broadcasters organize their national final is often declared as Super Saturday.

In sport, the final weekend of the Six Nations Championship, Rugby Union's premier international competition in Europe is referred to as "Super Saturday". It is the only day of the competition to feature all three games of a single round.

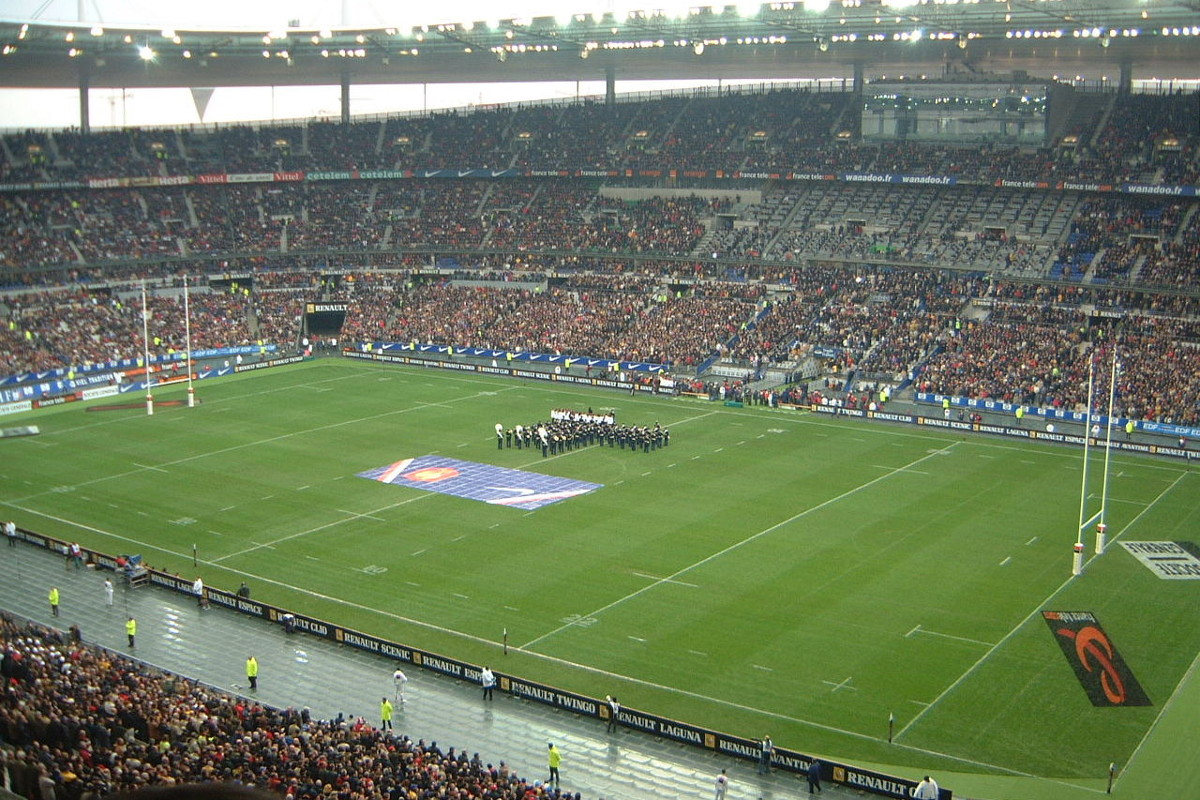
the phrase is perhaps now most frequently associated with the final weekend of the Six Nations in the UK.

The phrase was also used (mainly by the British media) to refer to the middle Saturday of the 2012 Summer Olympics (4 August) where Team GB athletes Jessica Ennis, Mo Farah, Greg Rutherford, Danielle King, Laura Trott, Joanna Rowsell, Tom James, Pete Reed, Andrew Triggs Hodge, Alex Gregory, Katherine Copeland and Sophie Hosking all won gold medals.

The final Saturday of the US Open in tennis is called "Super Saturday". If the tournament is running to schedule and has not been delayed by inclement weather or similar, both the men's semi-finals and the women's final are played on this day, with the men's semi-finals in the afternoon, then the women's final at night.

Outside of sport, the phrase was also used by British media to refer to the Saturday of October 19, 2019 when Boris Johnson’s withdrawal agreement for leaving the European Union was defeated in Parliament.

== See also ==
- Black Friday (shopping)
- Buy Nothing Day
- Small Business Saturday
- Cyber Monday
- Green Monday
- Giving Tuesday
- Moral panic
