= Panic =

Sudden overwhelming sensation of fear

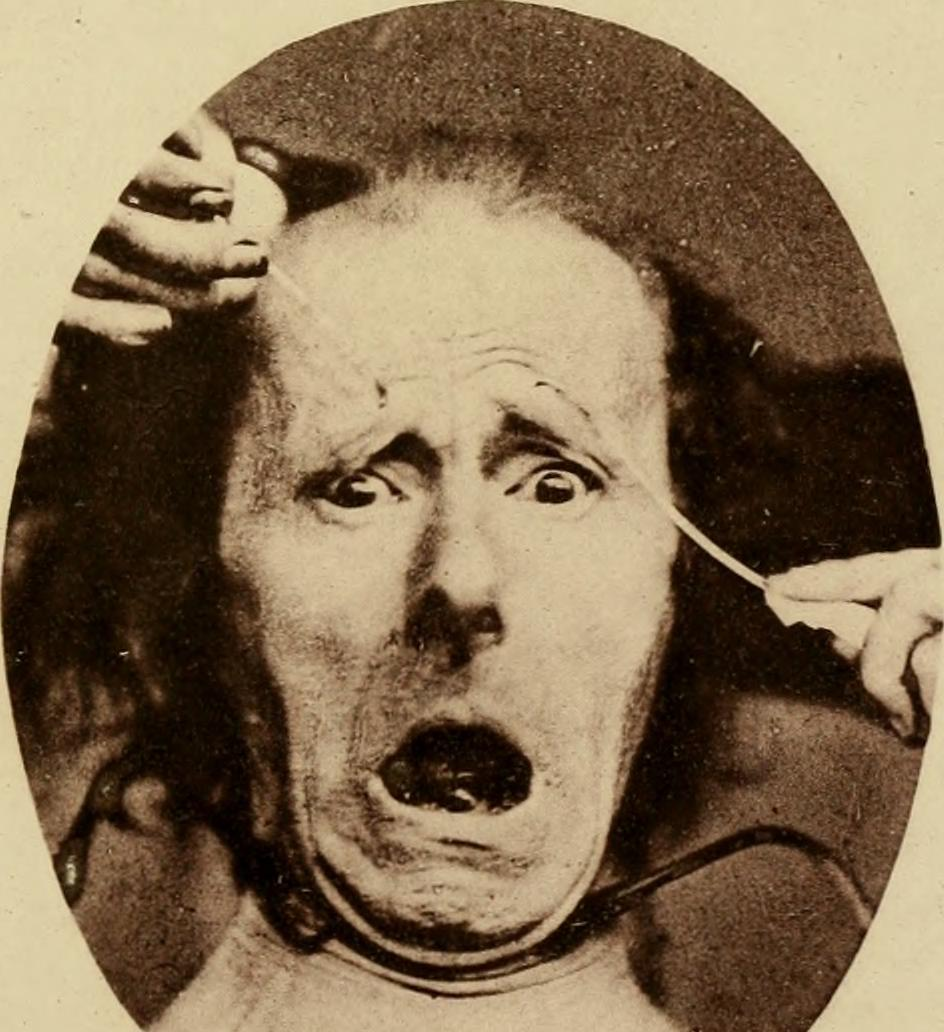
Illustration in Charles Darwin's The Expression of the Emotions in Man and Animals

Panic is a sudden sensation of fear, which is so strong as to dominate or prevent reason and logical thinking, replacing it with overwhelming feelings of anxiety, uncertainty and frantic agitation consistent with a fight-or-flight reaction. Panic may occur singularly in individuals or manifest suddenly in large groups as mass panic (closely related to herd behavior).

== Etymology ==
The word "panic" derives from antiquity and is a tribute to the ancient god Pan. One of the many gods in the mythology of ancient Greece, Pan was the god of shepherds and of woods and pastures. The Greeks believed that he often wandered peacefully through the woods, playing a pipe, but when accidentally awakened from his noontime nap he could give a great shout that would cause flocks to stampede. From this aspect of Pan's nature, Greek authors derived the word panikos, "sudden fear," the ultimate source of the English word: "panic." The Greek term indicates the feeling of total fear that is also sudden and often attributed to the presence of a god.

== Psychology ==
The fight-or-flight response (among other names) is a physiological reaction that occurs in response to a perceived harmful event, attack, or threat to survival. Animals react to threats with a general discharge of the sympathetic nervous system, preparing the animal for fighting or fleeing. The adrenal medulla produces a hormonal cascade that results in the secretion of catecholamines, especially norepinephrine and epinephrine. The hormones estrogen, testosterone, and cortisol, as well as the neurotransmitters dopamine and serotonin, also affect how organisms react to stress. The hormone osteocalcin might also play a part.

General adaptation syndrome regulates stress responses among vertebrates and other organisms involves the fight-or-flight response as it first stage.

A panic attack is a sudden period of intense fear and discomfort that may include palpitations, sweating, chest pain, shaking, shortness of breath, numbness, or a feeling of impending doom or of losing control. Typically, symptoms reach a peak within 10 minutes of onset, and last for roughly 30 minutes, but the duration can vary from seconds to hours. Though distressing, panic attacks themselves are not physically dangerous. They can either be triggered or occur unexpectedly.

In psychology, there is an identified condition called panic disorder that has been described as a specific psychological vulnerability of people to interpret normal physical sensations in a catastrophic way. It is related strongly to biological and psychological factors and their interactions. Leonard J. Schmidt and Brooke Warner describe panic as "that terrible, profound emotion that stretches us beyond our ability to imagine any experience more horrible" adding that "physicians like to compare painful clinical conditions on some imagined 'Richter scale' of vicious, mean hurt … to the psychiatrist there is no more vicious, mean hurt than an exploding and personally disintegrating panic attack."

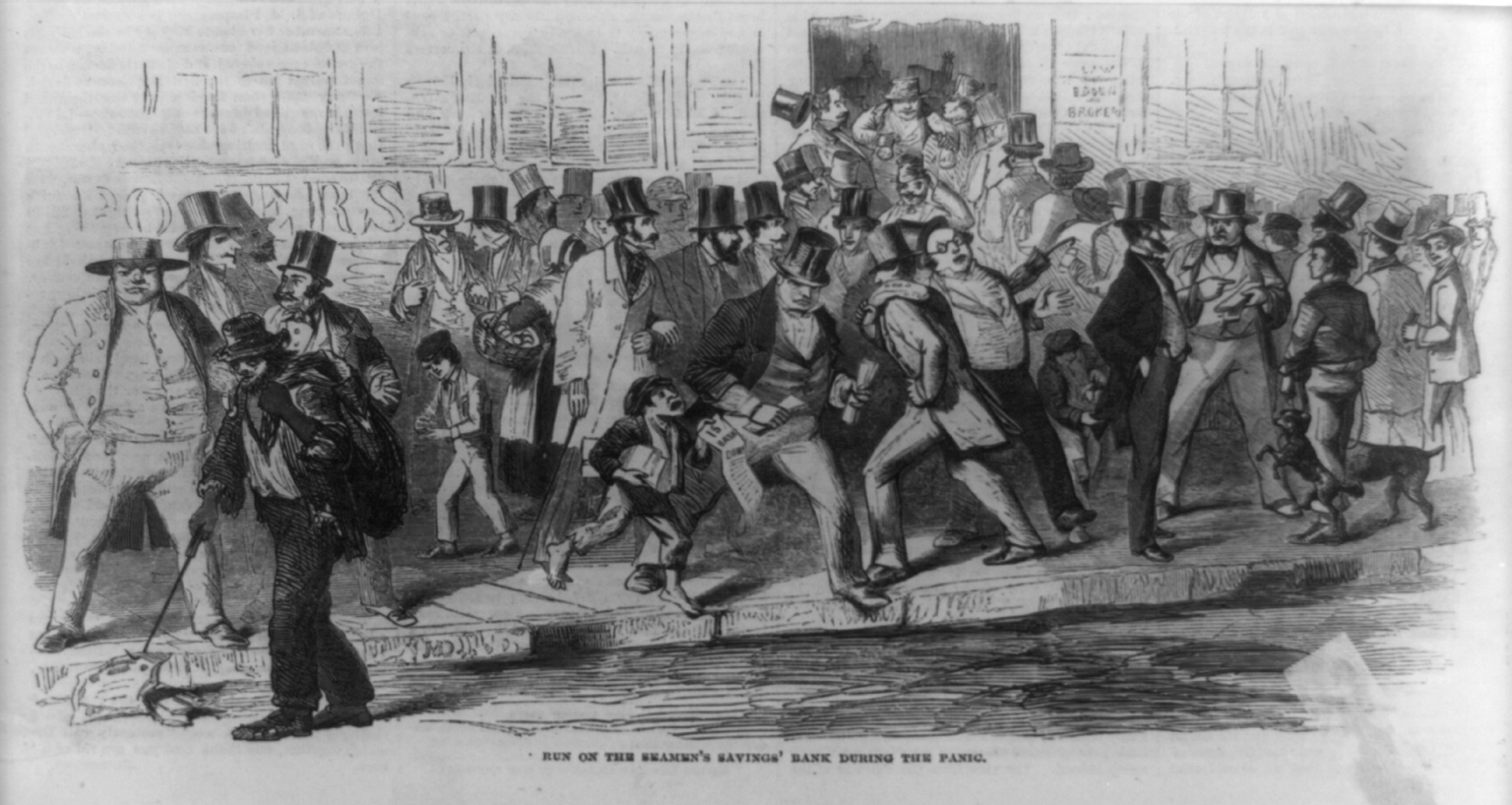
Bank run on the Seamen's Savings' Bank during the Panic of 1857

Panic attacks can occur due to several other disorders including social anxiety disorder, post-traumatic stress disorder, substance use disorder, depression, and medical problems.

Panic in social psychology is considered infectious since it can spread to a multitude of people and those affected are expected to act irrationally as a consequence. Psychologists identify different types of this panic event with slightly varying descriptions, which include mass panic, mass hysteria, mass psychosis, and social contagion.

An influential theoretical treatment of panic is found in Neil J. Smelser's Theory of Collective Behavior. The science of panic management has found important practical applications in the armed forces and emergency services of the world.

== Effects ==
Prehistoric humans used mass panic as a technique when hunting animals, especially ruminants. Herds reacting to unusually strong sounds or unfamiliar visual effects were directed towards cliffs, where they eventually jumped to their deaths when cornered.

Humans are also vulnerable to panic and it is often considered infectious, in the sense one person's panic may easily spread to other people nearby and soon the entire group acts irrationally, but people also have the ability to prevent and control their own and others' panic by disciplined thinking or training (such as disaster drills).

Architects and city planners try to accommodate for behaviors related to panic, such as herd behavior, during design and planning, often using simulations to determine the best way to lead people to a safe exit and prevent congestion or crowd crushes. The most effective methods are often non-intuitive. A tall column or columns, placed in front of the door exit at a precisely calculated distance, may speed up the evacuation of a large room, as the obstacle divides the congestion well ahead of the choke point.

Many highly publicized cases of deadly panic occurred during massive public events. The layout of Mecca was extensively redesigned by Saudi authorities in an attempt to eliminate frequent crushes, which kill an average of 250 pilgrims every year. Football stadiums have seen deadly crowd rushes and stampedes, such as at Heysel stadium in Belgium in 1985 with more than 600 casualties, including 39 deaths, at Hillsborough stadium in Sheffield, England, in 1989 when 96 people were killed in a crush, and at Kanjuruhan Stadium in Indonesia, in 2022 when 135 people were killed in a crush.

== See also ==
- Panic attack – Sudden periods of intense fear
- Anxiety – Unpleasant emotion
- Fight-or-flight response – Physiological reaction to a perceived threat or harmful event
- Angst – Intense feeling of apprehension, anxiety, or inner turmoil
- Collective behavior – Sociological theory
- Collective identity – Shared sense of belonging to a group
- Emotion – Conscious subjective experience
- Hysteria – Excess, ungovernable emotion
- Kernel panic – Fatal error condition in Unix-like operating systems
- Moral panic – Fear that some evil threatens society
- Financial crisis – Situation in which financial assets suddenly lose a large part of their nominal value
- Panic disorder – Anxiety disorder characterized by reoccurring unexpected panic attacks
- Panic Saturday (Super Saturday) – Last Saturday before Christmas; major Christmas-shopping day in the USA, last Saturday before Christmas
- Panic! at the Disco – American pop rock band
