= South American Initiative =

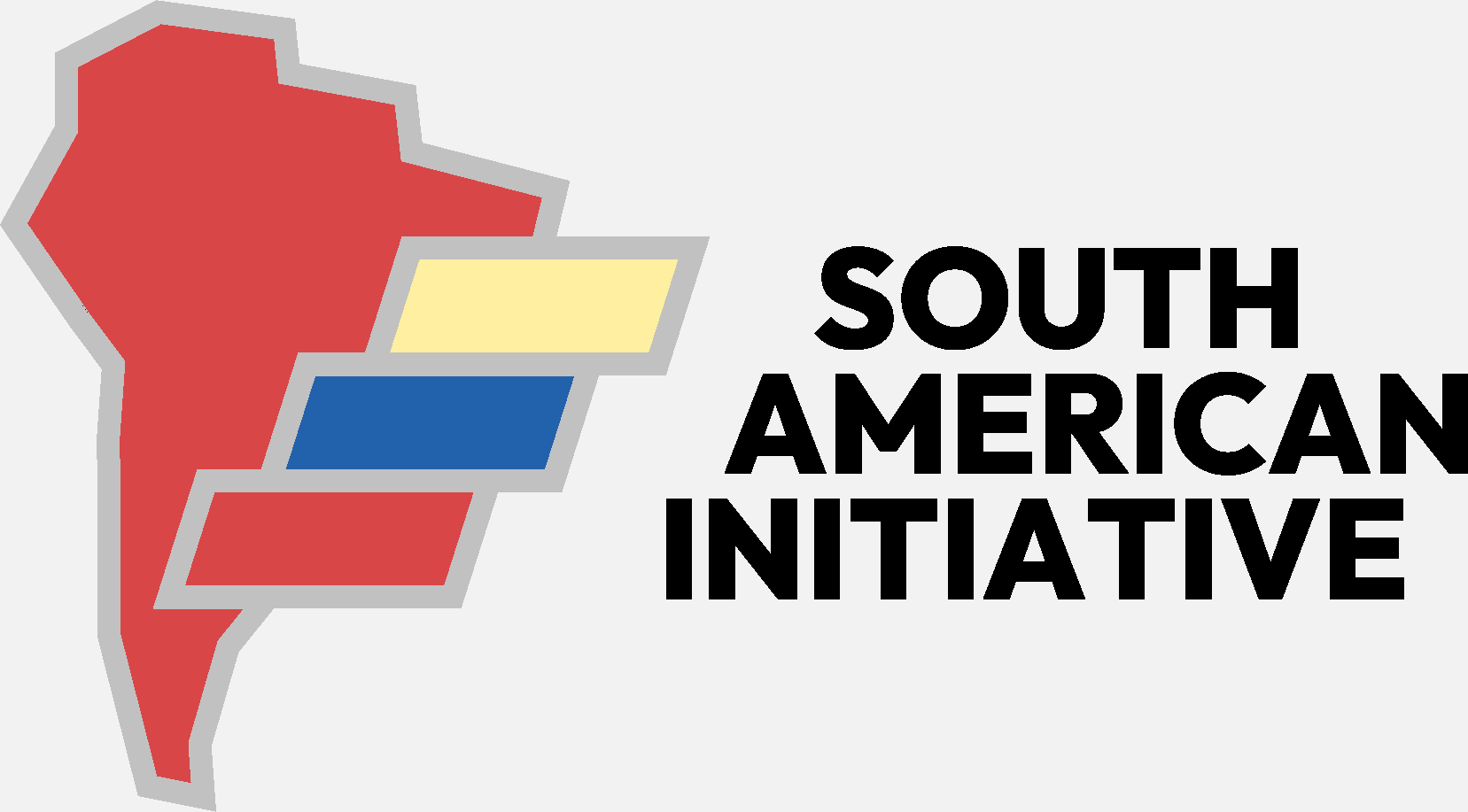
- Abbreviation: SAI
- Formation: 2016
- Type: Non-governmental organization
- Registration no.: EIN: 81-1747993
- Purpose: Humanitarian aid
- Headquarters: Florida, United States
- Region served: South America
- Volunteers: 125
- Website: https://sai.ngo

South American Initiativeis a nonprofit humanitarian organization based in Florida, United States. Founded in 2016, it is registered as a tax-exempt charity under section 501(c)(3) of the Internal Revenue Code. Its stated aim is to serve underserved communities across South America, though most of its current work takes place in Venezuela. SAI's programs in Venezuela cover four main areas. It supplies food, clothing, and hygiene products to orphaned and at-risk children, and its medical programs provide consultations, diagnostic tests, and medicine to patients with limited access to care, including children and pregnant women. The organization also distributes food to low-income families and to communities affected by shortages or emergencies. Its animal welfare work supports shelters and sanctuaries with food, veterinary care, and supplies for rescued and abandoned dogs.

== History ==
Founding and early years (2016–2021)

South American Initiative was founded in 2016 by S. Malca, a philanthropist living in South Florida. Malca started the organization in response to the economic and humanitarian crises affecting several South American countries, and recruited a team of volunteers to run its programs.

SAI’s first projects were in Venezuela, where it delivered aid to hospital patients, orphaned children, homeless people, elderly residents of nursing homes, and families without enough to eat. Through 2021, most of its work centered on food. It made regular deliveries to orphanages and set up a meal program for patients in hospitals that did not routinely feed the people in their care. During this period, the hospital program served more than 55,000 meals. The orphanage deliveries grew into an ongoing nutrition program serving several institutions, with larger and more frequent distributions.

Between 2019 and 2021, SAI began raising funds through online giving platforms, including GlobalGiving and Benevity. During the COVID-19 pandemic, it added personal protective equipment and sanitation supplies to the food and other aid it was already delivering to hospitals and low-income communities, and widened its distribution in cities including Valencia and Caracas.

Since 2022

After the pandemic, SAI shifted toward longer-term health programs. Its main addition was the SAI Medical Clinic, which offers free care in general medicine, gynecology, and pediatrics, and has its own laboratory for diagnostic testing. Patients also receive medication, such as antibiotics and vitamins, according to their treatment needs.

The orphanage program continued to grow, supplying participating facilities with food and other basic goods on a regular schedule. SAI also kept up its animal welfare work, providing food and veterinary care to dogs, shelters, and sanctuaries.

== Six campaigns and projects ==
By 2017, SAI had already helped more than 3,500 people through its six main campaigns and projects: Help Venezuela, Help Venezuelan hospitals, Help Venezuelan Orphans, Venezuela Zoo Animal Rescue Program, Help Abandoned Pets: Providing Food and Care and Latin American Education Fund. More projects will be developed in the future.

== Campaigns or projects ==
=== Help Venezuela ===
Life in Venezuela has dramatically changed since 2014. Today people wait in lines near supermarkets day-by-day waiting for a portion of rationed food that will only feed one or two members of the family for one week. Food shortages are rampant and many people waiting in line all day have had to leave the supermarkets with empty arms.

Since the country suffered from hyperinflation since 2016, its people have dealt with unimaginable consequences.

The average Venezuelan has lost nearly 24 lbs. After the economic crisis started, there has been looting and violence in the streets leaving wounded people without access to medical-care and essential provisions. South American Initiative is committed to the people of Venezuela in providing a helping hand to each person who is in a vulnerable situation to offer food, clothing, footwear, drinking water, medical care, and education.

=== Help Venezuelan Hospitals ===
In a country where it seems that the only thing that predominates is political affairs, the healthcare system is declining more and more. Every day, articles have been published in the press denouncing the poor state of the main public hospitals in Venezuela. Increasingly, the health crisis and the shortage of food and medicine are prevalent throughout the country. This project will go toward feeding vulnerable adults and children in different hospitals and providing them with essential medicines.

Since the beginning of this project, the South American Initiative team has been on a mission to provide enough meals and clean drinking water to orphaned children and hospitalized adults to cover their needs for a healthy diet. SAI always provides the help new moms require to take care of their babies like diapers, formula, feeding bottles, medicine and other supplies needed to care of new moms and just born infants.

=== Help Venezuelan Orphans ===
Many children in Venezuela are abandoned, some of them arrive at different hospitals, and at orphanage doors tucked inside cardboard boxes and backpacks. In the worst cases some newborns are found in the trash abandoned but still living.

The economic crisis the country is going through has caused many parents to abandon their children because they do not have the money to feed them. Parents know that the only chance their children have of surviving this political and economic crisis is to give them up to local orphanages. Many of these children arrive in a situation of critical malnutrition.

=== Venezuela Zoo Animal Rescue Program ===
Due to current government corruption and a tense political environment, Venezuela’s zoo animals are not getting the help they need. Private zoos are suffering because of the economic crash and non-existent tourism as a result of the crisis.

Public zoos suffer the worst because of the lack of funds, theft, and corruption. The challenge of SAI is to identify the needs of private and public zoos and provide the food and medical care they need to keep the animals alive and healthy.

South American Initiative is stepping in to fill this gap by providing food and essential medical care to the neglected animals suffering in these unsupported zoos. SAI currently works with two zoos and one animal refuge to provide food and medical care with additional plans to work with more.

The South American Initiative’s long-term goal is to feed sick and neglected animals with proper care and nutrition in all the zoos throughout Venezuela.

=== Help Abandoned Pets: providing food and care ===
After seeing the large number of sick pets abandoned in the streets, South American Initiative has developed relationships with animals nonprofits in order to provide the resources needed to care for these animals and prevent diseases to public health.

The crisis and the shortages in Venezuela also affect pets. Dog owners in Venezuela have been forced to abandon their pets. The price of dog food has increased by more than 50% and exceeds $4 per kilogram. This has caused there to be more abandoned pets than before.

Among the possible solutions to the problem of stray dogs in the streets include the promotion of responsible pet ownership and understanding that having an animal is a privilege and a great responsibility. Another solution is to strengthen the help for all non-profit animal organizations, providing funds for sterilization campaigns, animal food, treatments for fleas, scabies, rabies, and other diseases.

=== Latin American Education Fund ===
Venezuela is currently undergoing an extreme crisis due to the political and economic unrest in the country. As a result, many individuals flee to the United States looking for help and the opportunity to start a new and better life. The issue is that when they take refuge in the United States, they do not have the education to have access to the multiple job opportunities that the United States offers.

Access to quality education provides a foundational framework for individuals navigating resettlement in an unfamiliar country. For Venezuelan migrants and refugees, educational integration enhances employment prospects, which facilitates financial self sufficiency and family support. By equipping participants with necessary skills, this program aims to foster long term economic stability and socioeconomic independence.

== See also ==
- Shortages in Venezuela
- Crisis in Venezuela (2010–present)
