= Green Monday =

Online retail industry term

- Celebrations: Shopping / Consumerism
- Date: 2nd Monday in December
- 2025 date: December 8
- 2026 date: December 14
- 2027 date: December 13
- 2028 date: December 11
- Frequency: annual
- Related to: Christmas

Green Monday is an online retail industry term similar to Cyber Monday. The term was coined by Shopping.com, an eBay company, in 2007 to describe the best eCommerce sales day in December, usually the second Monday of December. After doing some internal research, they realized that the second Monday in December was the last day that shoppers were able to place an online order that would arrive in time for the holidays. Green Monday is defined more specifically by business research organization comScore as the last Monday with at least 10 days prior to Christmas.

In 2009, $854 million was spent online in the US on Green Monday, with sales in 2011 reaching $1.133 billion. In 2012, Green Monday topped out at $1.27 billion, up 13% from 2011 and the third heaviest online sales day for the season behind Cyber Monday and Dec. 4, 2012 (which had no marketing tie-in), according to comScore.

== See also ==
- Green Friday
- Black Friday (shopping)
- Buy Nothing Day
- Small Business Saturday
- Super Saturday (Panic Saturday)
- Cyber Monday
- Giving Tuesday
