= Circular Monday =

Swedish movement on circular consumption

Circular Monday is a grassroots movement, database and shopping day for circular consumption. It involves businesses with circular economy business models that sell, rent, share and repair products made out of recycled materials, including second hand services.

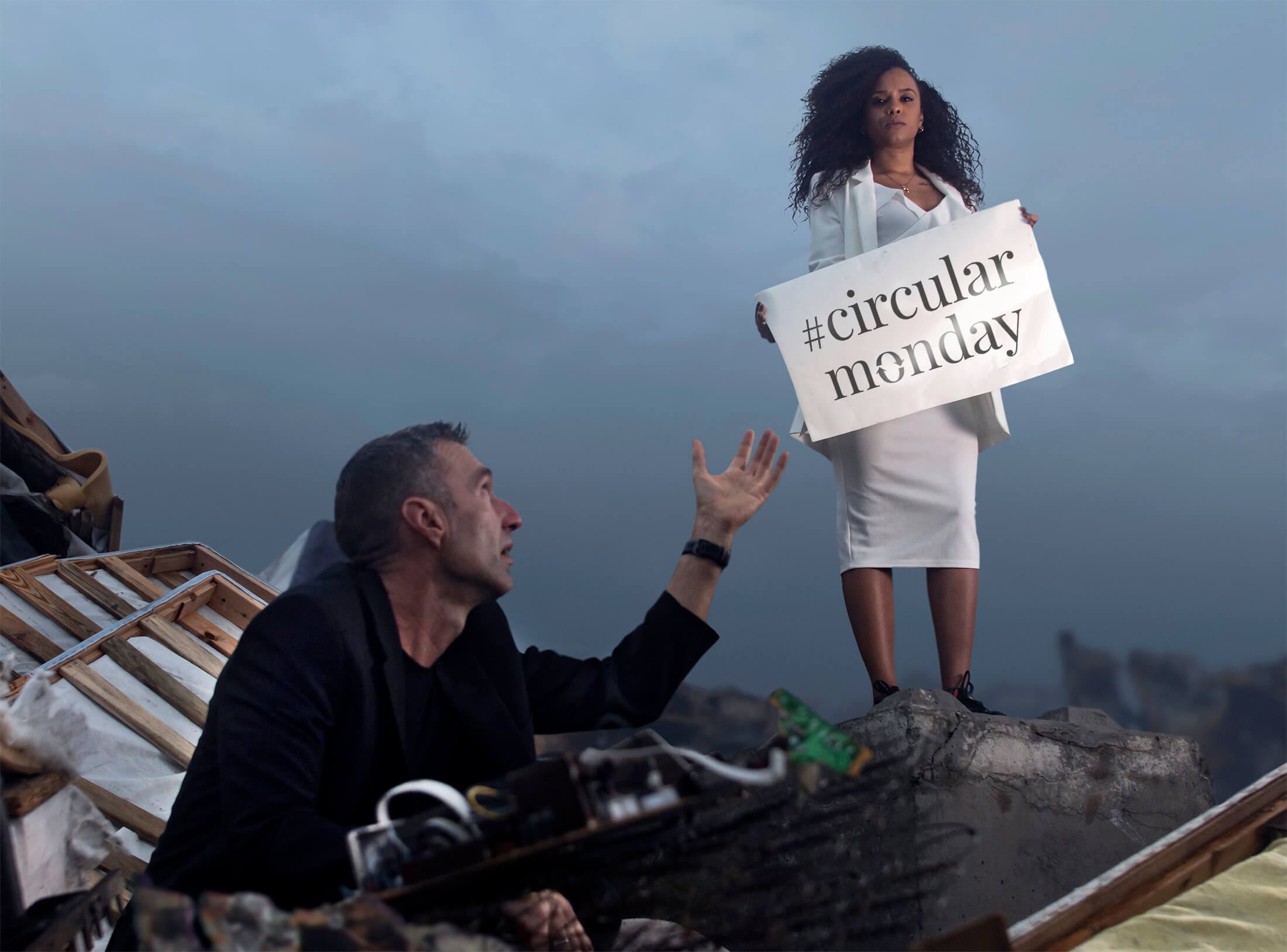
Black Friday reaches out his hand to the future, Circular Monday, in a rubbish tip.

It was founded in 2017 in Malmö, Sweden, by Swedish start-up founder Henning Gillberg, and was initially called White Monday; it changed name in 2020. It was devised as an antidote to Black Friday, which promotes linear consumption, and takes place on the Monday before Black Friday. By 2019, over 200 businesses were taking part. Participating businesses - mainly based in Europe - discount their products to expose circular alternatives to the linear consumption offered by Black Friday and other shopping days.

== See also ==
- Buy Nothing Day
