= Small Business Saturday =

United States marketing initiative

- Observed by: United States
- Celebrations: Shopping
- Date: Saturday after U.S. Thanksgiving
- 2025 date: November 29
- 2026 date: November 28
- 2027 date: November 27
- 2028 date: November 25
- Frequency: annual
- Related to: Thanksgiving, Black Friday, Buy Nothing Day, Super Saturday (Panic Saturday), Cyber Monday, Green Monday, Giving Tuesday, and Economics of Christmas

Small Business Saturday is a marketing initiative created and promoted by American Express to encourage holiday shopping on the Saturday after Thanksgiving in the United States, during one of the busiest shopping periods of the year. This Saturday is always the last one in November, so it falls between November 24 and November 30.

== History ==
First observed in the United States on November 27, 2010, Small Business Saturday is a counterpart to Black Friday and Cyber Monday, which feature big box retail and e-commerce stores respectively. By contrast, Small Business Saturday encourages holiday shoppers to patronize brick and mortar businesses that are small and local. Small Business Saturday is a registered trademark of American Express.

The first event was created by American Express, in partnership with the non-profit National Trust for Historic Preservation, Boston Mayor Thomas M. Menino, and Roslindale Village Main Street. In 2010, the holiday was promoted by American Express via a nationwide radio and television advertising campaign. That year Amex bought advertising inventory on Facebook, which it in turn gave to its small merchant account holders, and also gave rebates to new customers to promote the event.

American Express publicized the initiative using social media, advertising, and public relations. Many local politicians and small business groups in the United States issued proclamations concerning the campaign, which generated more than one million Facebook "like" registrations and nearly 30,000 tweets under the Twitter hashtags #smallbusinesssaturday and #smallbizsaturday.

== Hashtag ==
The Twitter hashtag #SmallBusinessSaturday has existed since early 2010 and was used to promote small businesses on any Saturday (not solely the Saturday between Black Friday and Cyber Monday). The hashtag is used in a manner similar to #FollowFriday to highlight favorite local businesses. Additionally, some small business owners have run marketing specials on the November Small Business Saturday to help boost in-foot or online traffic from holiday shoppers.

== Around the world ==
Small Business Saturday UK began in the United Kingdom in 2013 after the success of Small Business Saturday in the United States.

== See also ==
- Black Friday (shopping)
- Buy Nothing Day
- Super Saturday (Panic Saturday)
- Cyber Monday
- Green Monday
- Giving Tuesday
- Singles' Day
