= Black Friday (shopping) =

Friday following Thanksgiving in the US

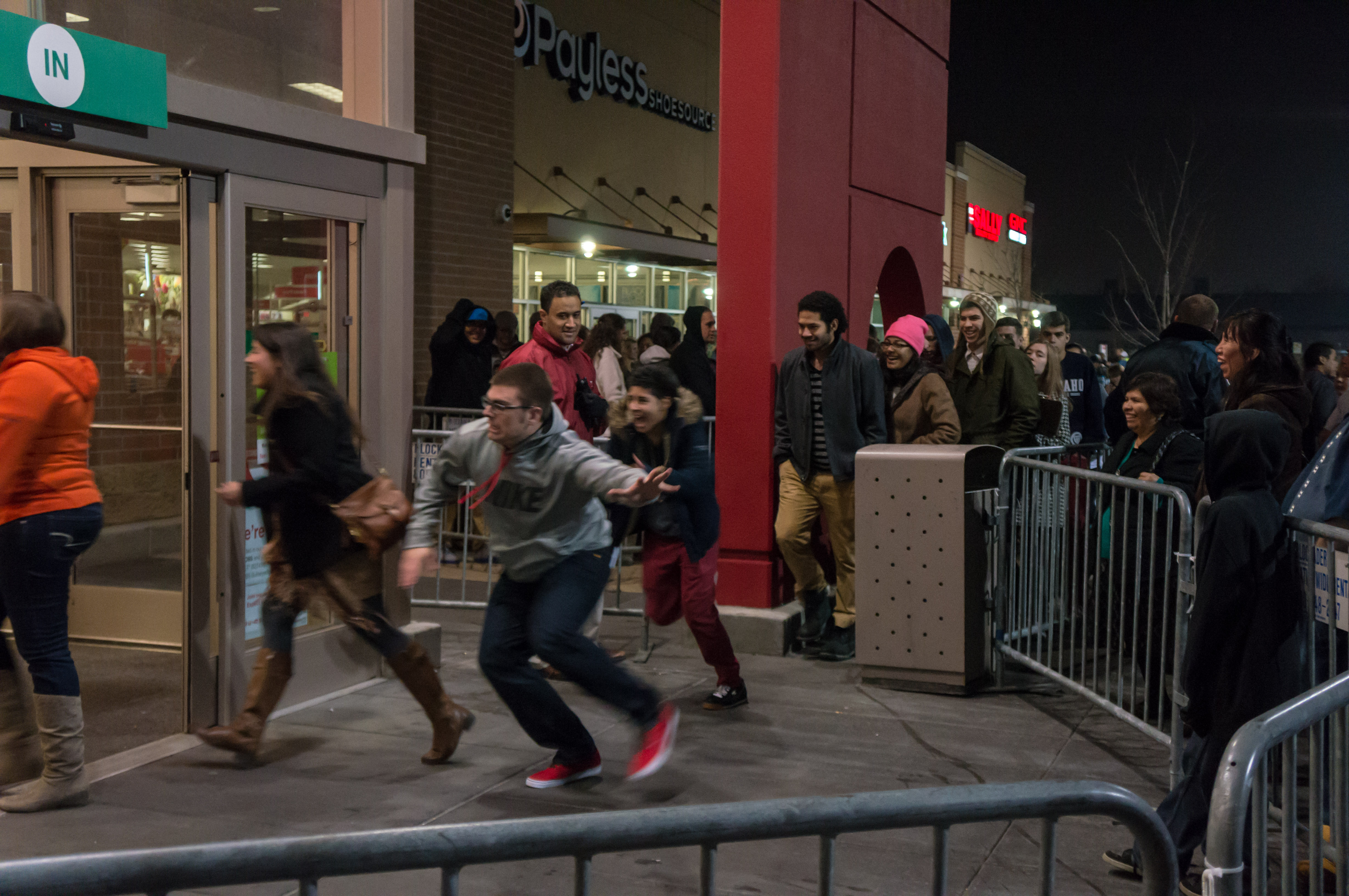
- Shoppers rushing into a Target store as it opens on Black Friday, 2013
- Observed by: Traditionally: United States; Others: Albania, Argentina, Australia, Canada, United Kingdom, Ireland, Kosovo, Liechtenstein, Germany, Poland, Romania, Italy, Greece, New Zealand, India, Malta, Norway, Sweden, Switzerland, Finland, France, Spain, Portugal, Israel, Brazil, The Netherlands, South Africa, Iceland, Mexico (as El Buen Fin) and increasingly in other parts of the world.
- Type: Commercial
- Significance: Popular shopping day
- Observances: Shopping
- Date: Day after US Thanksgiving
- 2025 date: November 28
- 2026 date: November 27
- 2027 date: November 26
- 2028 date: November 24
- Frequency: Annual
- Related to: Thanksgiving, Small Business Saturday, Cyber Monday, Giving Tuesday, Christmas, Buy Nothing Day

Black Friday is the Friday after Thanksgiving in the United States. It traditionally marks the start of the Christmas shopping season and is the busiest shopping day of the year in the United States. Many stores offer highly promoted sales at heavily discounted prices and often open early, sometimes as early as midnight or even on Thanksgiving. Some stores' sales continue to Monday ("Cyber Monday") or for a week ("Cyber Week").

"Black Friday" has evolved in meaning and impact over the years, initially referring to calamitous days, with a notable early instance being the Black Friday of 1869 in the United States. This financial crisis saw a dramatic plunge in gold prices, affecting investors. The term was later used in American retail, starting ambiguously in the 1950s. Initially associated with workforce absence post-Thanksgiving, it was reinterpreted by Philadelphia police to describe the shopping-induced congestion. Attempts at rebranding to "Big Friday" failed, and the term "Black Friday" solidified by the 1980s, referring to the pivotal point where retailers purportedly shifted from loss ("in the red") to profit ("in the black"). This day marks the unofficial start of the Christmas shopping season, with promotional sales aiming to draw large crowds. Black Friday is the busiest shopping day of the year in the United States and retailers prioritize it and Cyber Monday as highly profitable holiday shopping days.

The concept has since globalized, with countries around the world adopting "Black Friday" sales to mimic the US phenomenon, adjusting local customs or creating similar events. The advent of online shopping and events like "Cyber Monday" have expanded the traditional one-day shopping frenzy into a broader holiday shopping season, diluting the singular focus of Black Friday, and expanding its economic impact.

== Etymology ==
For centuries, the adjective "black" has been applied to days upon which calamities occurred. Many events have been described as "Black Friday", although the most significant such event in American history was the Panic of 1869, which occurred when financiers Jay Gould and James Fisk took advantage of their connections with the Ulysses S. Grant administration in an attempt to corner the gold market. When President Grant learned of this manipulation, he ordered the Treasury to release a large supply of gold, which halted the run and caused prices to drop by 18%. Fortunes were made and lost in a single day, and the president's own brother-in-law, Abel Corbin, was ruined.

The earliest known use of "Black Friday" to refer to the day after Thanksgiving occurred in the journal, Factory Management and Maintenance, for November 1951, and again in 1952. Here it referred to the practice of workers calling in sick on the day after Thanksgiving, in order to have a four-day weekend. However, this use does not appear to have caught on. Around the same time, the terms "Black Friday" and "Black Saturday" came to be used by the police in Philadelphia and Rochester to describe the crowds and traffic congestion accompanying the start of the Christmas shopping season. In 1961, the city and merchants of Philadelphia attempted to improve conditions, and a public relations expert recommended rebranding the days "Big Friday" and "Big Saturday", but these terms were quickly forgotten.

The use of the phrase spread slowly, first appearing in The New York Times on November 29, 1975, in which it still refers specifically to "the busiest shopping and traffic day of the year" in Philadelphia. Although it soon became more widespread, The Philadelphia Inquirer reported in 1985 that retailers in Cincinnati and Los Angeles were still unaware of the term.

As the phrase gained national attention in the early 1980s, merchants objecting to the use of a derisive term to refer to one of the most important shopping days of the year suggested an alternative derivation: that retailers traditionally operated at a financial loss for most of the year (January through November) and made their profit during the holiday season, beginning on the day after Thanksgiving. When this was recorded in the financial records, once-common accounting practices would use red ink to show negative amounts and black ink to show positive amounts. Black Friday, under this theory, is the beginning of the period when retailers would no longer be "in the red", instead of taking in the year's profits. The earliest known published reference to this explanation occurs in The Philadelphia Inquirer for November 28, 1981.

Since the early 21st century, there have been attempts by US-based retailers to introduce a retail "Black Friday" to other countries around the world. Retailers outside the US have attempted to promote the day to remain competitive with US-based online retailers.

In more recent decades, global retailers have adopted the term and date to market their own holiday sales.

== History ==
Thanksgiving's relationship to Christmas shopping led to controversy in the 1930s. Retail stores would have liked to have a longer shopping season, but no store wanted to break with tradition and be the one to start advertising before Thanksgiving. For this reason, in 1939, President Franklin D. Roosevelt issued a presidential proclamation proclaiming Thanksgiving to be the fourth Thursday in November rather than the last Thursday, meaning in some years one week earlier, in order to lengthen the Christmas shopping season. Most people adopted the President's change, which was later reinforced by an act of Congress, but many continued to celebrate Thanksgiving on the traditional date.

In 2015, Amazon.com was the first to offer "Black Friday in July" deals on what they called "Prime Day", promising better deals than on Black Friday. Amazon repeated the practice in 2016 and 2017, and other companies began offering similar deals.

Analyst Marshal Cohen of The NPD Group claimed in 2020 that Black Friday is declining in favor of online shopping, and that the COVID-19 pandemic has accelerated this process. The pandemic also resulted in holiday deals being offered over a longer period of time, even as early as October. Fewer people shopped in person on Black Friday 2020, and most business took place online. Market research company Numerator said sellers of clothing, tools and other items considered nonessential during lockdowns were not promoted as heavily because lower production meant less available to sell. Adobe Analytics reported that online sales reached $9 billion in 2020, 22% more than the previous year. Foot traffic to stores fell 48% in 2020 from last year, according to RetailNext, while Sensormatic Solutions reported a 52% decrease.

=== "Black Thursday" ===
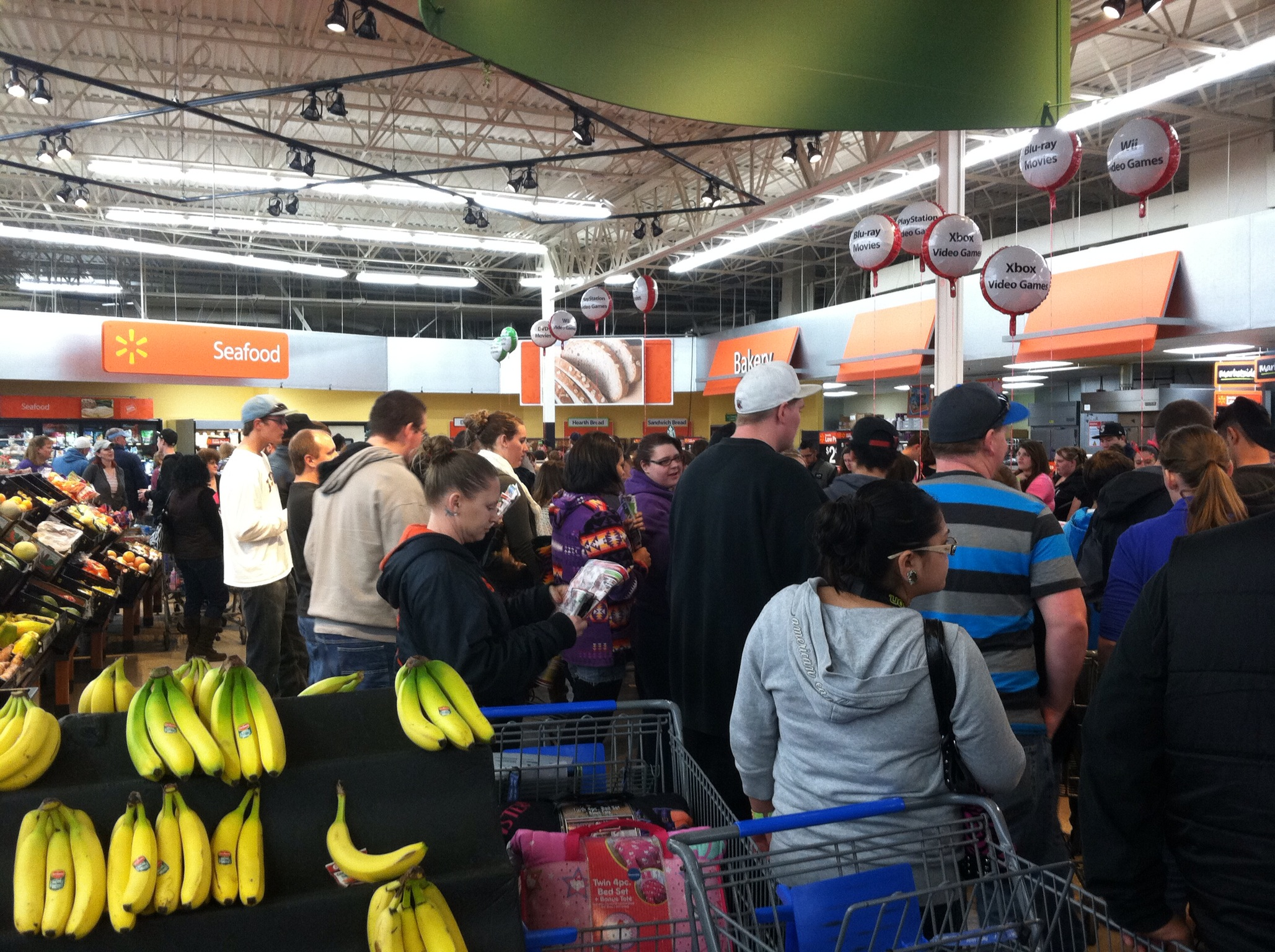
Black Thursday, Walmart

For many years, retailers pushed opening times on Black Friday earlier and earlier, eventually reaching midnight, before opening on the evening of Thanksgiving. Kmart opened its stores on Thanksgiving as early as 1991, and was open on Thanksgiving Day for many years. In 2009, Kmart manager Freddy Moss opened at 7 p.m. on Thanksgiving in order to allow shoppers to avoid Black Friday traffic and return home in time for dinner with their families. Two years later, a number of retailers began opening at 8 p.m. or 9 p.m., on what became derisively known as "Black Thursday". In subsequent years, other stores followed this trend, opening earlier and earlier on Thanksgiving, or remaining open all day, beginning in the early morning hours. Some retail and media sources have used the terms "Gray Thursday" or "Brown Thursday" instead.

The 2014 "Black Thursday" sales were generally a failure, as overall sales for the holiday week-end fell 11% compared to the previous year despite heavy traffic at the stores on Thanksgiving night. In response, a number of retailers decided to go back to closing on Thanksgiving for 2015, and Walmart, although its holding firm opening on the holiday and holding its sale, also pledged to offer the same deals online for those who wished to stay home.

Retailers have received pushback from some consumers over opening on Thanksgiving Day. Shopper opposition to stores opening on Thursday includes the perceived over-commercialization of Thanksgiving, retail workers not being able to spend time with their loved ones on the holiday, and Thursday doorbuster sales forcing consumers to sacrifice enjoying Thanksgiving evening with their families in order to avoid missing out on highly sought-after items which might not be available again prior to Christmas.

Most retailers abandoned efforts to hold doorbuster sales on Thanksgiving in 2020; large crowds had been forbidden under most circumstances since March due to the ongoing COVID-19 pandemic, major retailers such as Walmart and Target had already reduced their hours and dropped 24/7 operations in response to the pandemic, and several retailers known for opening on the holiday (particularly Kmart, which has typically been open regular hours) have rapidly declined. According to Adobe Analytics, online shopping set a record on Thanksgiving 2020 with $5.1 billion in total spending, 21.5% higher than in 2019. Most major retailers again closed on Thanksgiving in 2021, with Target stating that its decision would be permanent; the small minority of retail chains remaining open on the holiday that year were limited mainly to pharmacies, dollar stores and grocery stores, retail categories that traditionally do not hold doorbusters.

In 2025, shoppers began boycotting 3 major retailers, Target, Amazon and Home Depot, in what was known as the "We Ain't Buying It" campaign.

== Black Friday around the world ==
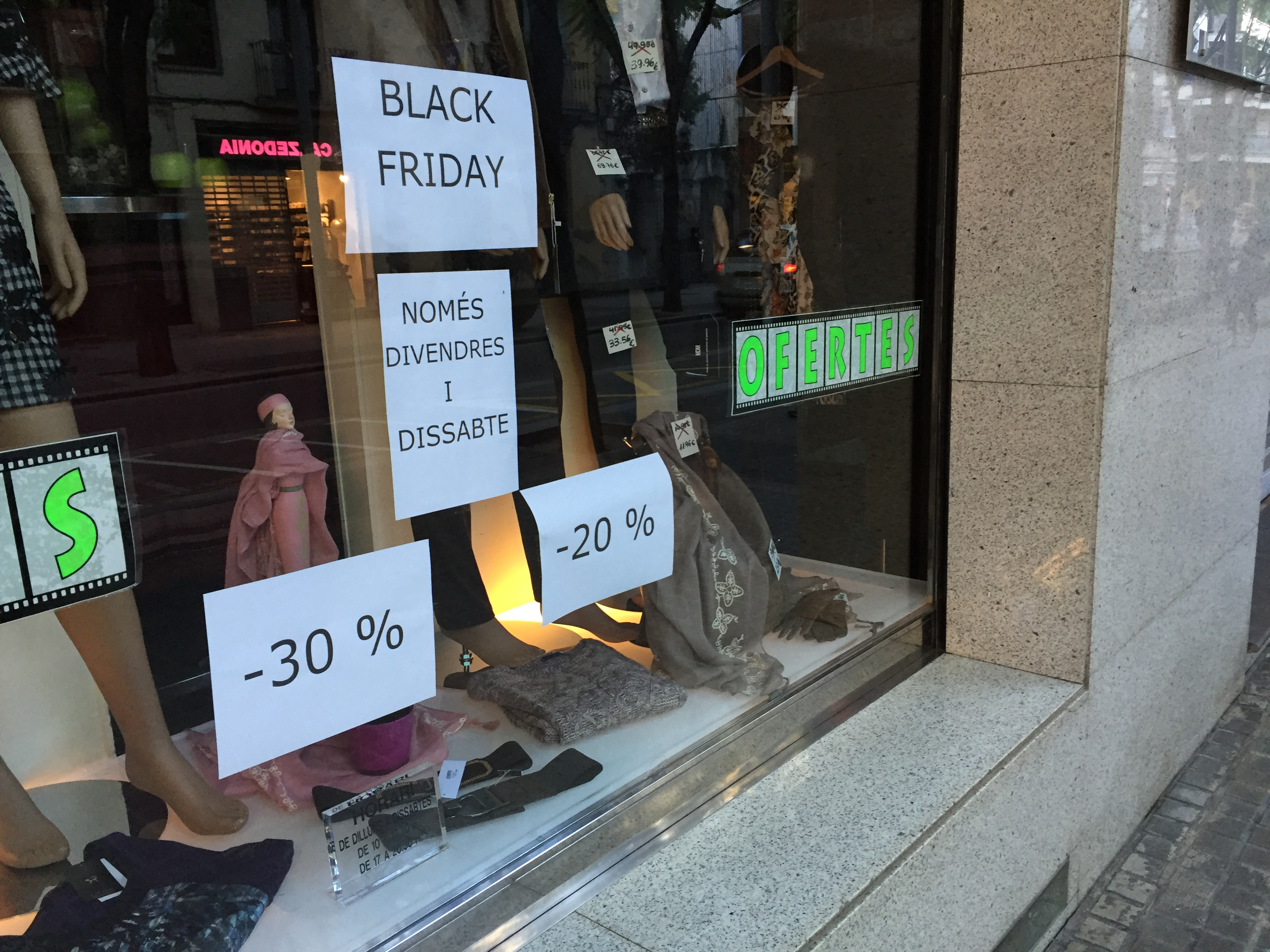
Large discounts at a store in Catalonia during Black Friday

=== Africa ===
==== Egypt ====
Black Friday, in Egypt, started in 2014, being introduced as White Friday. The change of name was due to religious, traditional, and cultural concepts.

==== Libya ====
Black Friday deals started in Libya since 2019, also introduced as White Friday due to religious, traditional and cultural concepts.

=== Asia ===
==== Pakistan ====
The use of Black Friday shopping terminology started in 2014 in major cities of Pakistan which later changed to "Blessed Friday" due to religious reasons. Now Blessed Friday (Black Friday) shopping festival is being observed regularly all over Pakistan.

==== India ====
The holiday shopping season in India has traditionally been aligned around the "festive period" of major festivals usually falling around October or November, such as Diwali. Similar to US-style shopping events such as Black Friday, online retailers adopted the practice of holding multi-day promotions during this period, such as Amazon's "Great Indian Festival" and Flipkart's "Big Billion Days". India's Independence Day (August 15) had also recently attracted similar events.

Nonetheless, the concept of Black Friday has also been imported into the subcontinent via international retailers – a move that influenced some Indian retailers to also adopt the promotion.

==== Saudi Arabia ====
In Saudi Arabia, black Friday started when a local e-commerce platform noon.com created Yellow Friday Sale which is now an annual event.

==== United Arab Emirates ====
U.A.E. Black Friday started as White Friday campaign in 2014. In 2018 local e-commerce platform noon.com created Yellow Friday in the U.A.E. The Yellow Friday Sale is now an annual event in U.A.E., falling around the same time as Black Friday globally.

China

Black Friday is celebrated in China in a limited capacity commercially instead of as a major retail sale. Certain e-commerce platforms will run Black Friday promotions around late November offering deals on electronics, fashion, and imported goods.

=== Europe ===
==== Belgium ====
Black Friday in Belgium has been seriously marketed by retailers since 2016. Online shops especially have broken sales records during the last edition of Black Friday, which provides a base for the further growth of Black Friday's popularity in Belgium. After 2016, Black Friday in Belgium has grown strongly. The number of participating shops have increased to over seventy during the Black Friday period of 2017. During Black Friday 2018, a total of 119 participating stores were measured in Belgium.

==== France ====
French businesses are slowly introducing the Black Friday custom into the market. Discounts of up to 85% were given by retailing giants such as Apple and Amazon in 2014. French electronics retailers such as FNAC and Auchan advertised deals online, while Darty also took part in this once-a-year monster sale. Retailers favored the very American term "Black Friday" to "Vendredi noir" in their advertisements. In 2016, because of the terror attacks in Paris in November the year before, some retailers used the name "Jour XXL" (XXL day) instead of Black Friday. An alternative was brought up by some online businesses in 2018, called "French Days", which goal is to replicate Black Friday during spring season (starting around the first day of May).

On November 20, 2020, the French government finalized an agreement with e-commerce businesses like Amazon and supermarket chains to postpone Black Friday promotions by a week. Discounted shopping promotions were to begin on December 4 instead, after physical stores shuttered during the COVID-19 pandemic were allowed to reopen.

==== Germany ====
In Germany, "Black Friday" retailer advertisements refer to "Black Week" and "Black Shopping" in English with sales lasting an entire week (excluding Sundays when most retail stores are closed). During this sales period, stores keep their normal working hours. Although goods are offered at reduced prices, the prices are not cut significantly more than normal weekly price reductions. Apple was the first company to run a special Black Friday campaign for the German market in 2006. Apple never used the name Black Friday in Germany, but promotes only a "one-day shopping event". In the first years, mostly internet retailers have used the event as an occasion to attract new customers with discounts, but bricks and mortar stores have already begun to adapt.

==== Ireland ====
Black Friday was introduced in 2014.

==== Latvia ====
In 2017, Black Friday became widely popular in Latvia. There was even a Black week and Black week-end sales in shopping centres.

==== Liechtenstein ====
In Liechtenstein, Black Friday Sale is a joint sales initiative by hundreds of online vendors. Over its first 24-hour run on November 28, 2013, more than 1.2 million people visited the site, making it the single largest online shopping event in German-speaking countries.

==== Netherlands ====
In the Netherlands, Black Friday was introduced in 2015. Some years before, there were already a number of large and small retailers that used Black Friday in their marketing. However, with a total of 35 participating stores, 2015 can be considered the year in which Black Friday started in the Netherlands due to a more widespread support of large retailers. The popularity of Black Friday has grown rapidly in the Netherlands. The number of participating stores has increased to over 125 during the Black Friday period of 2017. For the 2018 edition, 166 shops joined the largest black Friday platform in the Netherlands.

==== Norway ====
In Norway, Black Friday started as a publicity stunt campaign in 2010 to increase the sales to the shopping mall Norwegian Outlet. Since the introduction, it has been promoted every year in a larger and growing market all over the country.

==== Poland ====
There has been growing interest for Black Friday in Poland as well.

==== Romania ====
The concept was imported in Romania by eMAG and Flanco in 2011 and became bigger each year. The two reported the biggest Black Friday sales in 2014. eMAG sold products worth some 37 million euros while Flanco's sales totaled 22 million euros. Hundreds of retailers announced their participation in the 2015 campaign.

In 2015, 11 million Romanians say they have heard about Black Friday which is 73% of the 15 million people target segment; 6.7 million plan on buying something on biggest shopping event of the year in Romania.

In Romania, Black Friday is two weeks before the US Black Friday.

==== Spain ====
In 2015, Spain joined with some small retailers.

==== Sweden ====
In Sweden, Black Friday is widely practiced.

==== Switzerland ====
In 2015, Swiss retailer Manor was the first to launch a special Black Friday promotion. The year after, most Swiss retailers launched special offers during the Black Friday Week. In 2024, sales of 470 million Swiss francs are expected. Although Singles' Day (November 11) had initially grown in importance, it has now become significantly less relevant than Black Friday in Switzerland.

==== Turkey ====
Efsane Cuma, or "Legendary Friday," is the Turkish version of Black Friday – a major shopping event that falls on the last Friday of November. Efsane Cuma offers customers substantial discounts, promotions, and special deals across a variety of products, from electronics to clothing. This sales period has gained popularity in Turkey as both online and brick-and-mortar stores attract large crowds seeking bargains, often extending the deals for a few days or even over a week.

==== Ukraine ====
In 2016, Black Friday was introduced in Ukraine.

==== United Kingdom ====
In the United Kingdom, the term "Mad Friday", not to be confused with Black Friday, originated within the police and NHS to refer to the Friday before Christmas. It is the day when emergency services activate contingency plans to cope with the increase in workload due to many people going out drinking on the last Friday before Christmas. These plans can include setting up mobile field hospitals near city centre nightspots. The term has then been adopted outside those services to refer to the evening and night of the Friday immediately before Christmas, and would now be considered a mainstream term and not simply as jargon of the emergency services.

Traditionally, Boxing Day had been considered the biggest shopping day of the year in the UK. However, in the 2010s, several American-owned retailers, such as Amazon UK and the Walmart-owned chain Asda, began to hold US-style Black Friday promotions; in 2014, more British retailers began to adopt the concept, including Argos, John Lewis, and Very. That year, police forces were called to shops across Britain to deal with crowd control issues, assaults, threatening customers, and traffic issues. In response to incidents at branches of Tesco, Greater Manchester Police's deputy chief constable Ian Hopkins said shoppers had behaved in an "appalling" fashion, and criticized shops for not making adequate security arrangements to ensure the safety of customers." Following these incidents, some retailers began to discontinue or heavily modify their promotions, with Asda stating that it would not hold all of its sales across a single day.

In 2016, total spending on online retail sites on Black Friday was £1.23 billion, a 2.2% increase over 2015. In 2017, UK retail sales in November grew faster than in December for the first time.

=== North America ===
==== Canada ====
The large population centers on Lake Ontario and the Lower Mainland in Canada have always attracted cross-border shopping into the United States, and as Black Friday became more popular in the US, Canadians often flocked over the border because of their lower prices and a stronger Canadian dollar. After 2001, many were traveling for the deals across the border. Starting in 2008 and 2009, due to the parity of the Canadian dollar compared with the American dollar, several major Canadian retailers ran Black Friday deals of their own to discourage shoppers from leaving Canada.

The year 2012 saw the biggest Black Friday to date in Canada, as Canadian retailers embraced it in an attempt to keep shoppers from travelling across the border.

Before the advent of Black Friday in Canada, the most comparable holiday was Boxing Day in terms of retailer impact and consumerism.

==== Mexico ====
In Mexico, Black Friday was the inspiration for the government and retailing industry to create an annual week-end of discounts and extended credit terms, El Buen Fin, meaning "the good weekend" in Spanish. El Buen Fin has been in existence since 2011 and takes place on November in the week-end prior to the Monday in which the Mexican Revolution holiday is pushed from its original date of November 20, as a result of the measure taken by the government of pushing certain holidays to the Monday of their week in order to avoid the workers and students to make a "larger" week-end (for example, not attending in a Friday after a Thursday holiday, thus making a four-day week-end). On this week-end, major retailers extend their store hours and offer special promotions, including extended credit terms and price promotions.

==== United States ====
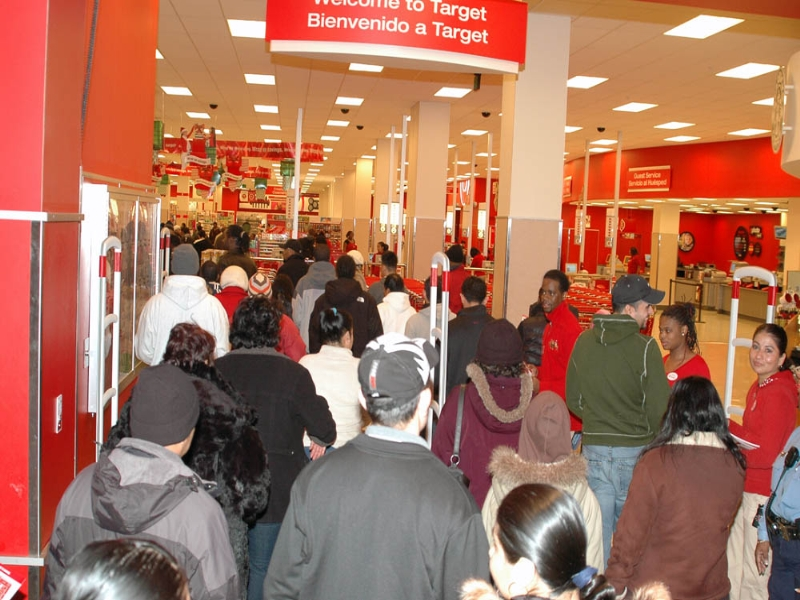
Interior of a Target store on Black Friday

Black Friday is not an official holiday in the United States, but California and some other states observe "The Day After Thanksgiving" as a holiday for state government employees and Nevada observes Family Day. It is sometimes observed in lieu of another federal holiday, such as Columbus Day. Many non-retail employees and schools have both Thanksgiving and the following Friday off. Along with the following regular week-end, this makes Black Friday weekend a four-day weekend, which is said to increase the number of potential shoppers.

The SouthPark neighborhood of Charlotte, North Carolina, is the most trafficked area of the United States on Black Friday.

Black Friday is a shopping day for a combination of reasons. As the first day after the last major holiday before Christmas, it marks the unofficial beginning of the Christmas shopping season. Additionally, many employers give their employees the day off as part of the Thanksgiving holiday week-end. In order to take advantage of this, virtually all retailers in the country, big and small, offer various sales including limited amounts of "doorbuster" items to entice traffic.

For many years, it was common for retailers to open at 6 a.m., but in the late 2000s many opened at 4 a.m.–5 a.m. The early 2010s have seen retailers extend beyond normal hours in order to maintain an edge or to simply keep up with the competition. In 2010, Toys "R" Us began their Black Friday sales at 10 p.m. on Thanksgiving and further upped the ante by offering free boxes of Crayola crayons and coloring books for as long as supplies lasted. Other retailers, like Sears, Express, MK, Victoria's Secret, Zumiez, Tillys, American Eagle Outfitters, Nike, Jordan, Puma, Aéropostale, and Kmart, began Black Friday sales early Thanksgiving morning and ran them through as late as 11 p.m. Friday evening. Forever 21 went in the opposite direction, opening at normal hours on Friday, and running late sales until 2 a.m. Saturday morning. In 2011, several retailers (including Target, Kohl's, Macy's, Best Buy, and Bealls) opened at midnight for the first time. In 2012, Walmart and several other retailers announced that they would open most of their stores at 8 p.m. on Thanksgiving, prompting calls for a walkout among some workers. In 2014, stores such as JCPenney, Best Buy, and Radio Shack opened at 6 a.m. on Thanksgiving while stores such as Target, Walmart, Belk, and Sears opened at 7 p.m. on Thanksgiving. Three states – Rhode Island, Maine, and Massachusetts – prohibit large supermarkets, big box stores, and department stores from opening on Thanksgiving, in what has been referred to as a legacy of blue laws. A bill to allow stores to open on Thanksgiving was the subject of a public hearing on July 8, 2017.

Historically, it was common for Black Friday sales to extend throughout the following week-end. However, this practice has largely disappeared in recent years, perhaps because of an effort by retailers to create a greater sense of urgency.

The news media usually give heavy play to reports of Black Friday shopping and their implications for the commercial success of the Christmas shopping season, but the relationship between Black Friday sales and retail sales for the full holiday season is quite weak and may even be negative.

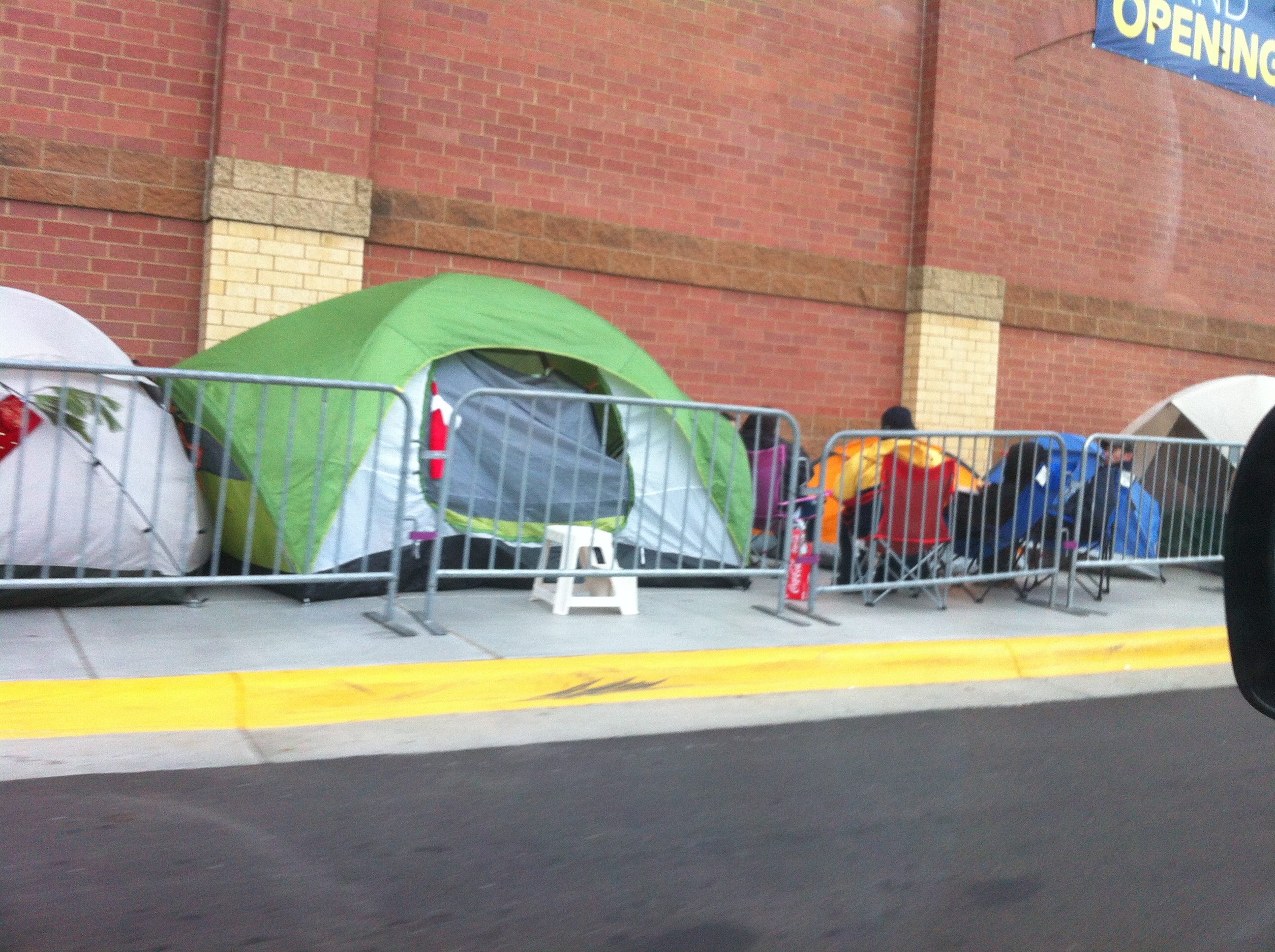
Camping overnight at a Best Buy store on Thursday, November 22, 2012

In 2014, spending volume on Black Friday fell for the first time since the 2008 recession. 50.9 billion dollars were spent during the four-day Black Friday week-end, down 11% from the previous year. However, the US economy was not in a recession. Christmas creep has been cited as a factor in the diminishing importance of Black Friday, as many retailers now spread out their promotions over the entire months of November and December rather than concentrate them on a single shopping day or week-end. Since the 2000s, the Thanksgiving Day edition of many American newspapers have been priced the same as their Sunday newspaper, due to the heavy volume of retail circulars contained within.

On April 23, 2014, ".blackfriday" joined a growing list of ICANN top-level domains (also including, for example, .com, .net, and .org).

In 2015, Neil Stern of McMillan Doolittle said, "Black Friday is quickly losing its meaning on many fronts," because many stores opened on Thanksgiving, and a lot of sales started even earlier than that. Online shopping also made the day less important. A Gallup poll in 2012 has shown that only 18% of American adults planned to shop during Black Friday.

In 2020, an article in Ad Age magazine stated that "an American capitalist tradition ... has been on the wane for years as online shopping rises in popularity" but the COVID-19 pandemic, "which has dramatically altered shopping patterns, has seemingly dealt a fatal blow."

By 2021, spending during the holiday season was expected to continue to increase, but Black Friday was no longer a single day. It was instead an opportunity for retailers to offer deals during the season as online shopping continued to change consumer behavior. COVID-19 had increased the changes in buyer and retailer moves toward online transactions. Supply chain disruptions caused consumers to buy earlier when they could find items. In 2025, shoppers across the US are expected to spend over $100 billion.

=== Oceania ===
==== Australia ====
In Australia, the term is controversial, as prior to its popularisation as a shopping day, it referred not to shopping at all, but to the devastating Black Friday bushfires that occurred in Victoria 1938–39. It was not until the 2010s that it was heavily promoted as a shopping day in Australia by in-store and online retailers, despite backlash and confusion by consumers. In 2011, Online Shopping USA hosted an event on Twitter. Twitter users had to use the hashtag #osublackfriday, which allowed them to follow along and tweet their favourite deals and discounts from stores. In 2013, Apple extended its Black Friday deals to Australia. Purchasing online gave customers free shipping and free iTunes gift cards with every purchase. The deals were promoted on its website, reading "Official Apple Store – One day Apple shopping event Friday, November 29". Australia Post's ShopMate parcel-forwarding service allows Australian customers to purchase products with "Black Friday" deals from the US and get them shipped to Australia. ShopMate ran from 2014 to 2022. It closed in February 2022 amid controversy about shipping costs. In addition to this service, numerous stores in the country run Black Friday promotions in-store and online throughout the country.

==== New Zealand ====
Black Friday started picking up in New Zealand around 2013. In 2015, major retailers such as the Warehouse, Noel Leeming and Harvey Norman offered Black Friday sales, and by 2018 were joined by Farmers, JB Hi-Fi, Briscoes and Rebel Sport. Paymark, which processes around 75% of New Zealand's electronic transactions, recorded $219 million NZD (US$151 million) of transactions on Black Friday 2017, up over 10% from the previous year.

=== Central and South America ===
==== Bolivia ====
2014 marked the introduction in Bolivia.

==== Brazil ====
Black Friday has been increasingly adopted by stores in Brazil since 2010, although not without its share of inflated prices and other scams, especially in its earlier years, earning the nickname "Black Fraude" (Black Fraud) or also "Black Furadei", which comes from the slang word "furada", meaning a "jam" or tough situation, usually involving money. It is also common to hear Brazilian people say that prices on Brazilian Black Friday are "half of the double".

==== Colombia ====
Black Friday was introduced in 2014.

==== Costa Rica ====
Black Friday is known as Viernes Negro in Costa Rica.

==== Panama ====
In Panama, Black Friday was first celebrated in 2012, as a move by the government to attract local tourism to the country's capital city. During its first year, it was believed to have attracted an inflow of about 35,000 regional tourists according to the government's immigration census.

== Black Friday online ==
=== High traffic challenges for retailers ===
Some online stores invest a lot of money in promotional campaigns to generate more sales and drive traffic to their stores. However, they often forget about the high loads their sites are going to experience. According to Retail Gazette, "A number of major retailers' websites went down as they failed to cope with the surge in Black Friday traffic in 2017 ... This just highlights that some retailers have not taken the necessary steps to prepare for Black Friday. Failing to prepare for peak can cause poor performance, site downtime, and ultimately lost revenue for retailers". Such carelessness results in huge reputational damage. Moreover, the 2017 Veeam Availability Report in South Africa found that "Unplanned downtime costs organisations around the world an average of R270m annually, up from the R210m of the previous year".

=== Advertising tip sites ===
Some websites offer information about day-after-Thanksgiving specials up to a month in advance. The text listings of items and prices are usually accompanied by pictures of the actual ad circulars. These are either leaked by insiders or intentionally released by large retailers to give consumers insight and allow them time to plan.

In recent years, some retailers (including Walmart, Target, OfficeMax, Big Lots, and Staples) have claimed that the advertisements they send in advance of Black Friday and the prices included in those advertisements are copyrighted and are trade secrets. Some of these retailers have used the take-down system of the Digital Millennium Copyright Act (DMCA) as a means to remove the offending price listings.

The benefit of threatening Internet sites with a DMCA-based lawsuit has proved tenuous at best. While some sites have complied with the requests, others have either ignored the threats or simply continued to post the information under the name of a similar-sounding fictional retailer. However, careful timing may mitigate the take-down notice. An Internet service provider in 2003 brought suit against Best Buy, Kohl's, and Target Corporation, arguing that the take-down notice provisions of the DMCA are unconstitutional. The court dismissed the case, ruling that only the third-party posters of the advertisements, and not the ISP itself, would have standing to sue the retailers.

Usage of Black Friday advertising tip sites and buying direct varies by state in the US, influenced in large part by differences in shipping costs and whether a state has a sales tax. However, in recent years, the convenience of online shopping has increased the number of cross-border shoppers seeking bargains from outside of the US, especially from Canada. Statistics Canada indicates that online cross-border shopping by Canadians has increased by about 300M a year since 2002. The complex nature of additional fees such as taxes, duties, and brokerage can make calculating the final cost of cross-border Black Friday deals difficult. Cross-border shopping solutions exist to mitigate the problem through estimation of the various cost involved.

In 2019, Adobe shopping data showed that around 39% of the shopping was done through smartphones. In 2022, 48% of online sales are made through smartphones, up from 44% in 2021. Meanwhile, consumers spent a record $9.12 billion shopping online during Black Friday in 2022.

=== Cyber Monday ===
The term Cyber Monday, a neologism invented in 2005 by the National Retail Federation's division Shop.org, refers to the Monday immediately following Black Friday based on a trend that retailers began to recognize in 2003 and 2004. Retailers noticed that many consumers who were too busy to shop over the Thanksgiving week-end or did not find what they were looking for shopped for bargains online that Monday from home or work. In 2010, Hitwise reported:

Thanksgiving weekend offered a strong start, especially as Black Friday sales continued to grow in popularity. For the 2nd consecutive year, Black Friday was the highest day for retail traffic during the holiday season, followed by Thanksgiving and Cyber Monday. The highest year-over-year increases in visits took place on Cyber Monday and Black Friday with a growth of 16% and 13%, respectively.

In 2013, Cyber Monday online sales grew by 18% over the previous year, hitting a record $1.73 billion, with an average order value of $128. In 2014, Cyber Monday was the busiest day of the year with sales exceeding $2 billion in desktop online spending, up 17% from the previous year.

=== Cyber Week ===
As reported in the Forbes "Entrepreneurs" column on December 3, 2013: "Cyber Monday, the online counterpart to Black Friday, has been gaining unprecedented popularity – to the point where Cyber Sales are continuing on throughout the week." Peter Greenberg, travel editor for CBS News, further advises: "If you want a real deal on Black Friday, stay away from the mall. Black Friday and Cyber Monday are all part of Cyber Week ..."

== Retail sales impact ==
The National Retail Federation releases figures on the sales for each Thanksgiving week-end. The Federation's definition of "Black Friday week-end" includes Thursday, Friday, Saturday and projected spending for Sunday. The survey estimates number of shoppers, not number of people.

The length of the shopping season is not the same across all years: the date for Black Friday varies between November 23 and 29, while Christmas Eve is fixed at December 24.

Findings from NRF surveys regarding Black Friday weekend
Year	Date	Survey published	Shoppers (millions)	Average spent	Total spent	Consumers polled	Margin for error
2021	Nov. 26	Nov. 30	180	$301.27	$54.2 billion	5,759	± 1.3%
2020	Nov. 27	Dec. 1	186	$311.75	$58.1 billion	6,615	± 1.2%
2019	Nov. 29	Dec. 3	190	$361.90	$68.8 billion	6,746	± 1.2%
2018	Nov. 23	Nov. 27	165	$313.29	$51.7 billion	3,058	± 1.8%
2017	Nov. 24	Nov. 28	174	$335.47	$58.3 billion	3,242	± 1.7%
2016	Nov. 25						
2015	Nov. 27						
2014	Nov. 28	Nov. 30	233	$380.95	$50.9 billion	4,631	± 1.5%
2013	Nov. 29	Dec. 1	249	$407.02	$57.4 billion	4,864	± 1.7%
2012	Nov. 23	Nov. 25	247	$423.66	$59.1 billion	4,005	± 1.6%
2011	Nov. 25	Nov. 27	226	$398.62	$52.5 billion	3,826	± 1.6%
2010	Nov. 26	Nov. 28	212	$365.34	$45.0 billion	4,306	± 1.5%
2009	Nov. 27	Nov. 29	195	$343.31	$41.2 billion	4,985	± 1.4%
2008	Nov. 28	Nov. 30	172	$372.57	$41.0 billion	3,370	± 1.7%
2007	Nov. 23	Nov. 25	147	$347.55	$34.6 billion	2,395	± 1.5%
2006	Nov. 24	Nov. 26	140	$360.15	$34.4 billion	3,090	± 1.5%
2005	Nov. 25	Nov. 27	132	$301.81	$26.8 billion		

== See also ==
These are various day-long events similar to Black Friday around the world or any other events on the same day as Black Friday.

- Boxing Day
- Buy Nothing Day on the same day
- Circular Monday, a grassroots movement, database and shopping day for circular consumption
- Cyber Monday, three days later
- Giving Tuesday, four days later
- Green Monday
- Native American Heritage Day on the same day
- Prime Day, a discounted retail day servicing Amazon.com customers
- Singles' Day, a shopping day popular in China that occurs on November 11
- Small Business Saturday on the following day
- Super Saturday (also known as Panic Saturday)
