= GivingTuesday =

American nonprofit

- Observed by: Worldwide
- Date: Tuesday after Thanksgiving
- 2025 date: December 2
- 2026 date: December 1
- 2027 date: November 30
- 2028 date: November 28
- Frequency: Annual
- First time: Founded in 2012 by Henry Timms at the 92nd Street Y in New York City
- Related to: Thanksgiving, Black Friday, Buy Nothing Day, Small Business Saturday, Cyber Monday, and Christmas

GivingTuesday is the Tuesday after Thanksgiving in the United States. It is touted as a "global generosity movement unleashing the power of people and organizations to transform their communities and the world". An organization of the same name is an independent 501(c)(3) nonprofit that supports the global movement.

GivingTuesday was initiated in 2012 by Henry Timms at the 92nd Street Y in New York. The co-founding organization was the United Nations Foundation.. The project received a startup grant from the Lodestar Foundation.

The date range is November 27 to December 3, and is always five days after the US Thanksgiving holiday. A similar concept was floated in 2011 at the non-profit Mary-Arrchie Theater Company in Chicago by then-producing director Carlo Lorenzo Garcia, who urged shoppers via The Huffington Post to consider donating to charity after they had finished their Cyber Monday shopping. He suggested the name Cyber Giving Monday.

In its first eight years, GivingTuesday was housed in the 92nd Street Y's Belfer Center for Innovation & Social Impact. In June 2019, GivingTuesday split off from 92Y to become an independent organization, with Asha Curran as CEO.

Among others, GivingTuesday has received support from The Bill & Melinda Gates Foundation, Craig Newmark Philanthropies, Emerson Collective, Fidelity Charitable, the Case Foundation, the Ford Foundation, the Ford Motor Company, PayPal, the William and Flora Hewlett Foundation and the David Lynch Foundation.

== Programs ==
GivingTuesday organizes programs with the concept of "generosity not as a benevolence that the haves show to the have-nots but rather an expression of mutuality, solidarity, and reciprocity."

GivingTuesday coordinates 75 country movements each organized according to local cultures. In each country, a team of entrepreneurial leaders work with their own ecosystems of communities, nonprofits, platforms, religious institutions, families, schools, and private sector partners to drive increased giving, connection, and innovation.

At the local and issue level, GivingTuesday operates through a network of community based groups. These groups may be organized by community foundations, nonprofits, giving groups, giving circles, and social activists. In the U.S. more than 240 GivingTuesday communities and coalitions bring together people with a common connection to a geography, cause, culture or identity.

=== Data Commons ===
The GivingTuesday Data Commons is a philanthropic data collaboration that partners across sectors and borders to understand the drivers and impacts of generosity, explore giving behaviors and patterns, and use data to inspire more giving around the world.

=== #GivingTuesdaySpark ===
Originally called GivingTuesdayKids, #GivingTuesdaySpark is a youth program for people between ages of 8 and 22. The program focuses on amplifying young people's voices and encouraging tgenerosity worldwide.

=== Starling Collective ===
Starling Collective is a fellowship and training program for grassroots organizers that are often philanthropically unrecognized and under-supported.

== History ==
=== Summary of money moved ===
| Year | Date of GivingTuesday | Total money moved | Total money moved through Blackbaud | Total money moved through Facebook | Time window for which Facebook donations were matched | Other money moved |
|---|---|---|---|---|---|---|
| 2012 | November 27 | no information | $10.1 million | N/A | N/A | no information |
| 2013 | December 3 | $28 million (covers Blackbaud, DonorPerfect, GlobalGiving, Network for Good, and Razoo) | $19.2 million (+90% over 2012) | N/A | N/A | no information |
| 2014 | December 2 | $45.7 million ($34.9 million online, $10.8 million offline) (covers Blackbaud, DonorPerfect, GlobalGiving, Network for Good, and Razoo) (+63% over 2013); also Indiegogo money moved of $7.5 million | $26.1 million (+36% over 2013, +159% over 2012) | N/A | N/A | Indiegogo reported raising $7.5 million for 419 organizations. |
| 2015 | December 1 | $116.7 million | $39.6 million (+52% over 2014, +292% over 2012) | | N/A | |
| 2016 | November 29 | Estimates of $168 million and $177 million | $47.7 million | $6.79 million, of which Facebook and the Gates Foundation matched $900,000 | (not available) | PayPal: $48 million |
| 2017 | November 28 | $274 million | $60.9 million | $45 million, of which Facebook and the Gates Foundation matched $2 million | 86 seconds | PayPal: $64 million |
| 2018 | November 27 | $400 million (tentative approximate estimates) | $62.6 million | $125 million, of which Facebook and PayPal matched $7 million | 15 seconds | PayPal: $98 million, DonorPerfect: $35.2 million, Classy: $15.4 million |
| 2019 | December 3 | $511 million (estimated online donations), $1.97 billion (estimated total of online and offline donations; this was the first year that this quantity was officially estimated) | ?? | $120 million, of which Facebook matched $7 million; an additional $20 million raised in Giving Tuesday fundraisers in the week leading up to Giving Tuesday | 14 seconds | PayPal: $106 million |
| 2020 | May 5 (#GivingTuesdayNow) | $503 million in the U.S. | | | | |
| 2020 | December 1 | $2.47 billion in the U.S. | | | 2 seconds for 100% matching on first $2 million, ~3 hours for 10% matching on next $50 million | |
| 2021 | November 30 | $2.7 billion in the U.S. | | | | |
| 2022 | November 29 | $3.1 billion in the U.S. | | | | |
| 2023 | November 28 | $3.1 billion in the U.S. | | | | |
| 2024 | December 3 | $3.6 billion in the U.S. | | | | |
| 2025 | December 2 | | | | | |

=== 2012 ===
GivingTuesday received a $150,000 seed grant from the Lodestar Foundation in 2012. Lodestar President Lois Savage says "It was probably the most impactful grant in our philanthropy strategy that we’ve made".

The idea for GivingTuesday was first announced in October 2012, a month before the first planned GivingTuesday (November 27, 2012). The announcement was made by GivingTuesday founding partner Mashable, a technology website. Other founding partners listed in the story were Skype (launching Skype for Peace) and Cisco. Other partner organizations announced over the coming weeks included Microsoft, Sony, Aldo, Case Foundation, Heifer International, Phoenix House, and Starwood. Mashable provided detailed coverage of GivingTuesday.

Other news and opinion websites that announced GivingTuesday well in advance were CNet, the Huffington Post, and Deseret News.

Shortly before, during, and after the date, GivingTuesday was covered by Washington Post, the White House official blog, ABC News, and the Huffington Post. Forbes used the occasion to publish a guide to effective giving.

=== 2013 ===
Mashable also covered GivingTuesday in 2013, including a partnership with Google+ to hold a "hangout-athon" for GivingTuesday. The Huffington Post also covered GivingTuesday extensively.

GivingTuesday also received coverage in many philanthropy information websites, including Charity Navigator and the Chronicle of Philanthropy. The December 4 Chronicle of Philanthropy article highlighted a donation by Good Ventures (a foundation funded by Dustin Moskovitz and run by his wife Cari Tuna) to GiveDirectly, Google's hangout-a-thon, and matching grants announced by the Case Foundation.

GivingTuesday was also covered by mainstream newspapers such as the Los Angeles Times and USA Today.

Charitable giving on GivingTuesday in 2013 was approximately twice the value in 2012. Over 7,000 nonprofits participated in the 2013 GivingTuesday.

=== 2014 ===
In 2014, the #GivingTuesday movement launched the #GivingTower. The #GivingTower is a partnership between 92nd Street Y, the United Nations Foundation, and Crowdrise. Every donation in the #GivingTower represents a brick in the virtual Tower.

Philanthropy News Digest, the Chronicle of Philanthropy and Mashable reported estimates by the Indiana University Lilly Family School of Philanthropy (with help from the Case Foundation), based on payments processed by Blackbaud, DonorPerfect, GlobalGiving, Network for Good, and Razoo, that a total of $45.7 million was donated on GivingTuesday ($34.9 million online, and $10.8 million offline that were processed on the next day). Of this, $26.1 million was processed by Blackbaud. The tally did not include $7.5 million that Indiegogo claimed to have raised for 419 nonprofits on that day. By 2014, the movement became global and involved organizations and individuals from 68 countries.

=== 2015 ===
The John Templeton Foundation released a study based on a survey of Americans that showed that whereas 93% of respondents were familiar with Black Friday, only 18% were familiar with Giving Tuesday, showing that the day still had a long way to go in terms of achieving name recognition. Nonetheless, organizers were optimistic about continued growth in money moved, volunteering, and name recognition for the day, and payment processors and retailers offered donation matching and incentive schemes to encourage people to donate on the day. In 2015, Blackbaud supplied data to show real-time statistics on an online dashboard to highlight the impact of #GivingTuesday.

Facebook's principal founder and CEO Mark Zuckerberg and his wife Priscilla Chan published an open letter to their newborn daughter, announcing their intention to donate 99%+ of Zuckerberg's wealth from his Facebook shares through the newly formed Chan Zuckerberg Initiative. Their announcement, which did not mention GivingTuesday, happened on GivingTuesday 2015, and some commentators noted that the couple had taken GivingTuesday to a new level. However, Blackbaud's data analysts suspected that Zuckerberg's announcement did not have much effect on the overall volume of charitable giving for the day.

According to initial reports, Blackbaud processed $39.6 million in donations for GivingTuesday, and total money moved for the day was $117 million.

=== 2016 ===
In 2016, according to USA today, #GivingTuesday broke a record with $168 million in charitable donations worldwide, topping 2015 by 44%. CNBC reported GivingTuesday.org's number of $177 million. The Blackbaud group processed more than $47.7 million from more than 6,700 organizations (a 20% increase from 2015).

Furthermore, when compared with the previous year, online donation volumes increased by 31% while 33% more nonprofit groups received an online donation. Since 2012, they also calculated that the presence of GivingTuesday had increased by 317%.

In the U.K., Charities Aid Foundation announced more than one in ten adults took part in the event while 6.4 million people stated they had heard of the movement. Of these people, one in three stated they would do something for charity.

Facebook and the Bill & Melinda Gates Foundation announced $500,000 in matching for donations to fundraisers on Facebook, and Facebook waived fees for $500,000 in donations. After the $500,000 limit was hit within hours, the Gates Foundation increased its matching to $900,000.

=== 2017 ===
For GivingTuesday 2017, Facebook and the Bill & Melinda Gates Foundation announced $2 million in matching for donations to fundraisers on Facebook, and Facebook announced that it would waive its 5% fees for U.S.-based nonprofits all day long. Matching was limited to $1,000 per fundraiser and $50,000 per nonprofit. $45 million was raised by nonprofits through Facebook fundraisers on Giving Tuesday, well above the $2 million matching limit.

An unofficial third-party analysis, based on data shared by donors with timestamps of donations and whether or not they were matched, showed that donations were matched for only the first 86 seconds.

=== 2018 ===
For GivingTuesday 2018, Facebook and PayPal announced donation matching for up to $7 million in donations to United States nonprofits starting 8:00 EST on GivingTuesday, on a first-come-first-serve basis, up to $20,000 per donor and $250,000 per nonprofit. The match limit being hit was announced 9:05 EST (about one hour after the beginning of matching), and the announcement said that the match was achieved within seconds. An unofficial third-party estimate, based on data shared by donors with donation timestamps and whether or not they were matched, showed that donations made till 14 seconds after the start of donations were matched, but donations made 15 seconds or more after the start of matching were not matched. The analysis also claimed that only amounts up to $2,500 per donation were matched (distinct from the total limit per donor and per nonprofit of $20,000 and $250,000). A total of $125 million was raised via Facebook on GivingTuesday, the highest for a single day on the platform. Total donations on GivingTuesday were estimated to be nearly $400 million in the United States alone, according to tentative estimates.

=== 2019 ===
In July 2019, GivingTuesday spun off as a separate nonprofit from its former parent 92nd Street Y.

GivingTuesday was held on December 3, 2019. This was the first year that the GivingTuesday Data Collaborative attempted to estimate both online and offline donations on GivingTuesday. The estimate for online donations was $511 million, and the estimate for the total across online and offline donations was $1.97 billion.

Facebook announced donation matching for the first $7 million donated starting 8 AM EST on GivingTuesday (the amount matched, start time of match, and other conditions were the same as in 2018). A total of $120 million was raised through Facebook on GivingTuesday, and an additional $20 million was raised in GivingTuesday fundraisers in the week leading up to GivingTuesday. The amount raised through Facebook on GivingTuesday was slightly less than the corresponding amount from the previous year ($125 million).

An unofficial third-party analysis, based on data shared by donors with timestamps of donations and whether or not they were matched, estimated that Facebook's donation matching ran out within 14 seconds (similar to the 15 seconds seen for the previous year), but donation processing delays caused some donations made significantly earlier to not get matched.

=== 2020 ===
In response to the COVID-19 pandemic, an extra GivingTuesday was organized for May 5, 2020, under the name of GivingTuesday Now. On #GivingTuesdayNow, people responded with activity in 145 countries and a total of $503M in online donations were contributed in the U.S. alone.

The GivingTuesday Data Commons estimates that 34.8 million people participated in GivingTuesday on December 1, 2020, a 29% increase over 2019. GivingTuesday reports total giving increased from $1.97 billion to $2.47 billion in the United States alone, representing a 25% increase compared to GivingTuesday 2019. These totals are in addition to the surge of generosity represented by #GivingTuesdayNow on May 5.

During GivingTuesday 2020, it was reported that 12 countries officially participated in the national movement for the first time; these countries included Chile, Ghana, Guam, Ireland, Lebanon, Nigeria, Paraguay, Philippines, Senegal, Sierra Leone, South Korea, and Turkey.

For the normal GivingTuesday (December 1, 2020), Facebook announced slight changes to its donation matching. While the total match amount remained at $7 million and applied to donations starting at 8 AM EST, same as the previous two years, the structure of the match was changed: the first $2 million of donations to U.S. nonprofits would be matched at 100%, and the next $50 million would be matched at 10% (resulting in a spend of $5 million in matching funds). Limits were $100,000 per nonprofit and $20,000 per donor.

An unofficial third-party analysis, based on data shared by donors with timestamps of donations and whether or not they were matched, estimated that Facebook's 100% match (for the first $2 million) ran out within two seconds of matching, and the 10% match (for the next $50 million) lasted about three hours.

== Reception ==
Reception of GivingTuesday has generally been positive, with a large number of organizations, including Google, Microsoft, Skype, Cisco, UNICEF, the Case Foundation, Save the Children, and others joining in as partners. GivingTuesday has been praised as an antithesis of consumer culture and as a way for people to give back.

Timothy Ogden, managing director of the Financial Access Initiative at New York University and board member at effective altruism organization GiveWell, wrote articles for the Stanford Social Innovation Review skeptical of GivingTuesday, one in 2012 and another in 2013.

Inside Philanthropy attributed GivingTuesday's growing success and global reach to the role that technology companies and founders played in promoting the event, including the $5 million matching grant to GiveDirectly announced by Facebook co-founder Dustin Moskovitz's foundation Good Ventures and the $75,000 in matching funds announced by former AOL CEO Steve Case for donations made to charities supported by his organization.

A January 2015 article in Nonprofit Quarterly discussed GivingTuesday in the context of giving days in general. GivingTuesday was described as a federated, multi-platform campaign, that involved many different nonprofits and many donation processing platforms, all focusing on a single day so that they could coordinate efforts to raise awareness and publicity. It was contrasted with the Give to the Max Day in Minnesota, that involved many nonprofit participants but used a single donation processor every year to allow for better tracking of the money moved.

== See also ==
- Random Acts of Kindness Day
- World Giving Index
