= Small Business Saturday (UK) =

Campaign to support small businesses

Small Business Saturday is a UK campaign to support small business, taking place on the first Saturday in December each year. The campaign encourages businesses to promote themselves and work with other small businesses, and consumers to ‘shop local’ and support small, independent businesses in their communities. The first Small Business Saturday took place on 7 December 2013 with subsequent celebrations taking place on 6 December 2014, 5 December 2015, 3 December 2016 and 2 December 2017. In 2018, the event was held on 1 December.

In 2016, research after the day suggested that consumers spent £717m with small businesses on Small Business Saturday, an increase of 15% on 2015 spending.

Small Business Saturday 2017 was the most successful campaign yet with an estimated £748 million spent on the day.

Each year in the UK, small independent businesses are encouraged to apply for the #SmallBiz100, 100 businesses that are profiled nationally one a day in the run-up to Small Business Saturday.

The Small Business Saturday UK initiative has been supported by business organisations including the Federation of Small Businesses, Association of City and Town Management, Association of Convenience Stores and Northern Ireland Independent Retail Trade Association. It has received support from all political parties and a number of large corporations.

American Express founded the successful Small Business Saturday initiative in the U.S. in 2010 and it remains the principal supporter of the campaign in the UK, as part of its on-going commitment to encourage consumers to shop small.
