= Economics of Christmas =

Economic aspects of Christmas

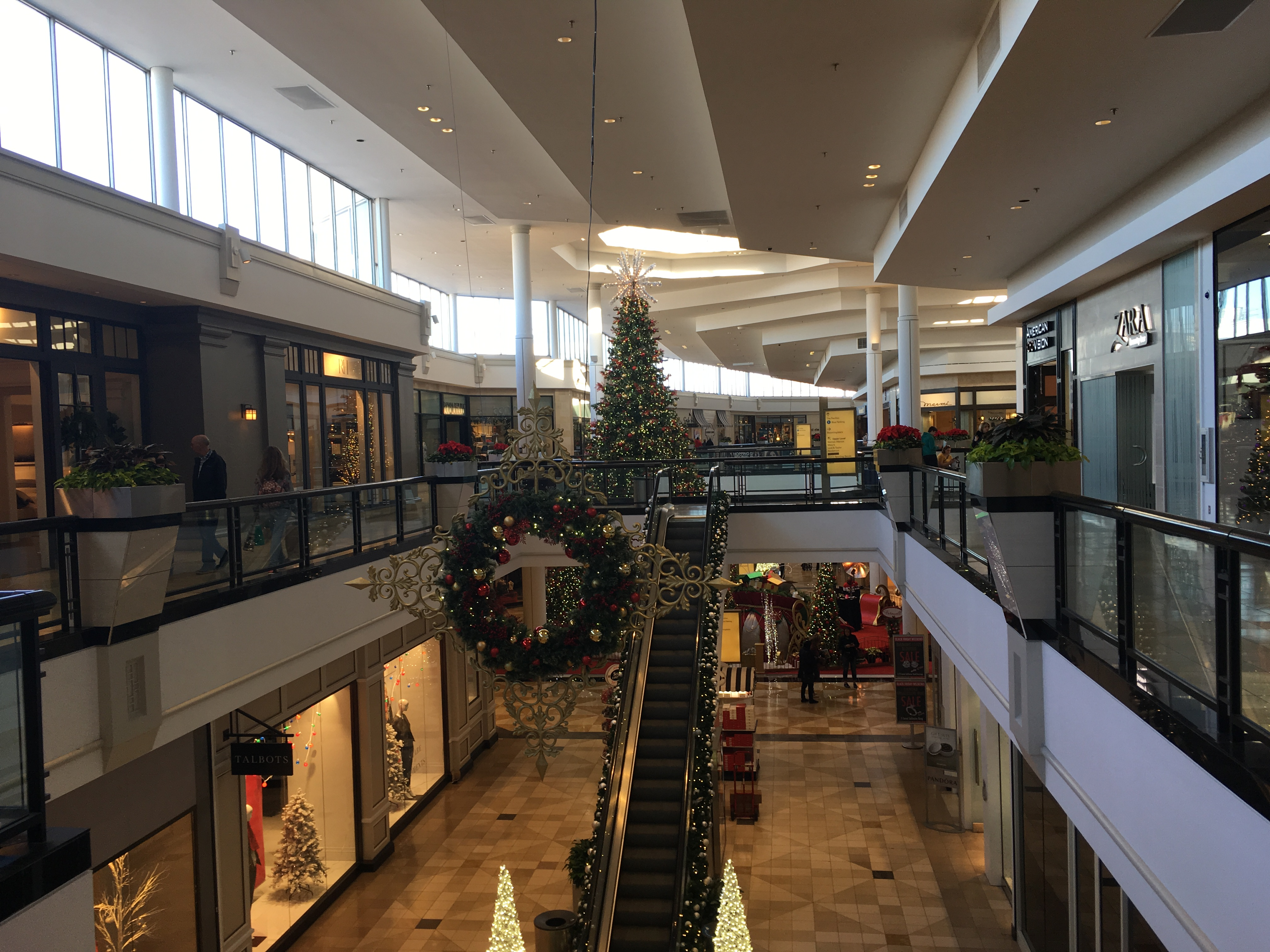
The King of Prussia Mall in King of Prussia, Pennsylvania decorated during the Christmas season

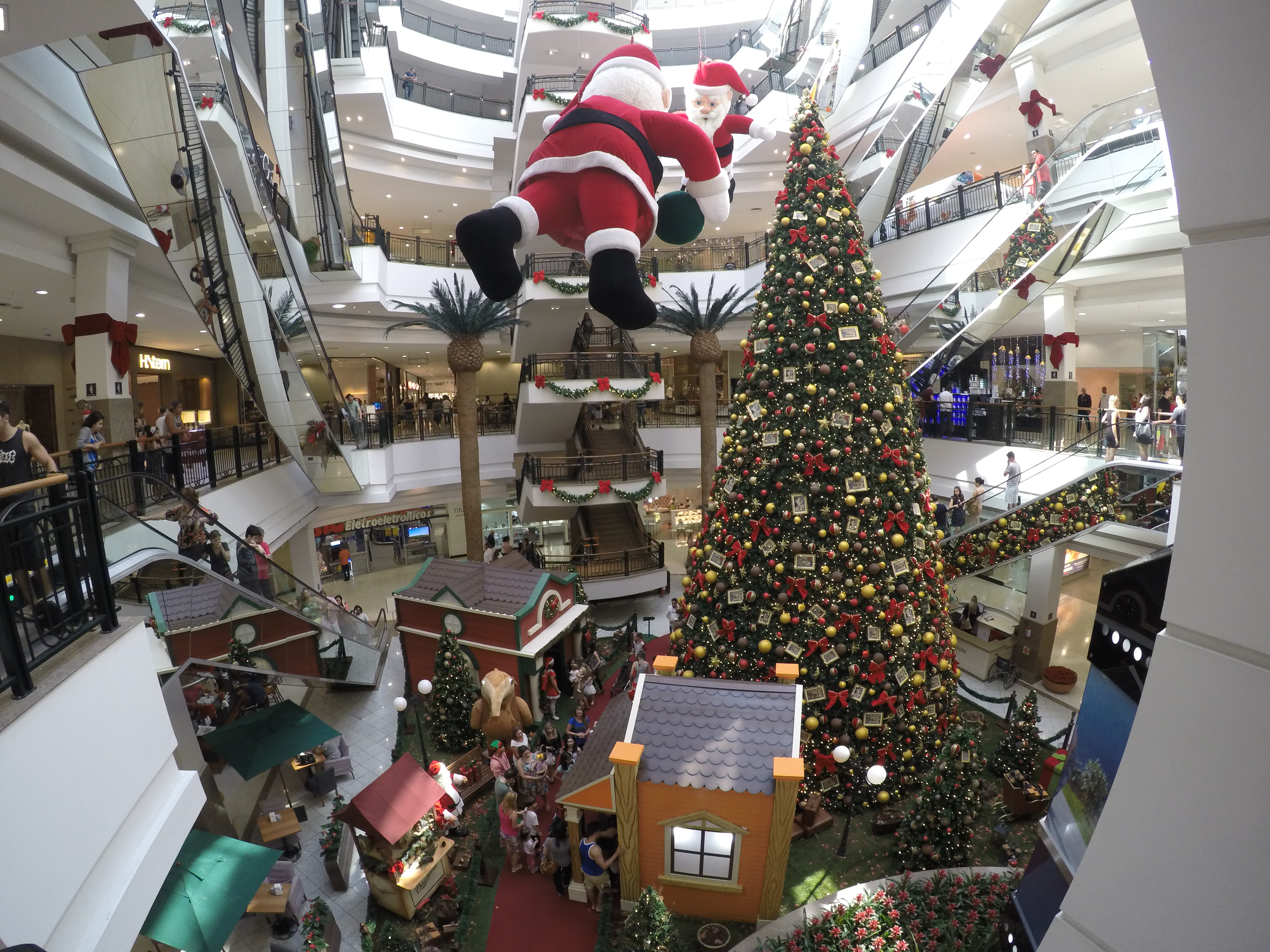
Christmas decorations abound in many shopping malls such as Iguatemi Florianópolis in Florianópolis

The economics of Christmas are significant because Christmas is typically a high-volume selling season for goods suppliers around the world. Sales increase dramatically as people purchase gifts, decorations, and supplies to celebrate. In the U.S., the "Christmas shopping season" starts as early as October. In Canada, merchants begin advertising campaigns just before Halloween (31 October), and step up their marketing following Remembrance Day on 11 November. In the UK and Ireland, the Christmas shopping season starts from mid-November, around the time when high street Christmas lights are turned on. In the United States, it has been calculated that about one fifth of retail sales to one quarter of all personal spending takes place during the Christmas/holiday shopping season. Figures from the United States Census Bureau reveal that expenditure in department stores nationwide rose from $20.8 billion in November 2004 to $31.9 billion in December 2004, an increase of 54 percent. In other sectors, the pre-Christmas increase in spending was even greater, due to a November through December buying surge of 100% in bookstores and 170% in jewelry stores. In the same year employment in American retail stores rose from 1.6 million to 1.8 million in the two months leading up to Christmas. This means that while consumers might spend more during this season, they also are given increased employment opportunities as sales rise to meet the increased demand.

Industries completely dependent on Christmas include Christmas cards, of which 1.9 billion are sent in the United States each year, and live Christmas trees, of which 20.8 million were cut in the U.S. in 2002. In most Western nations, Christmas Day is the least active day of the year for business and commerce; almost all retail, commercial and institutional businesses are closed, and almost all industries cease activity (more than any other day of the year), whether laws require such or not. In England and Wales, the Christmas Day (Trading) Act 2004 prevents all large shops from trading on Christmas Day. Film studios release many high-budget movies during the holiday season, including Christmas films, fantasy movies or high-tone dramas with high production values to hopes of maximizing the chance of nominations for the Academy Awards.

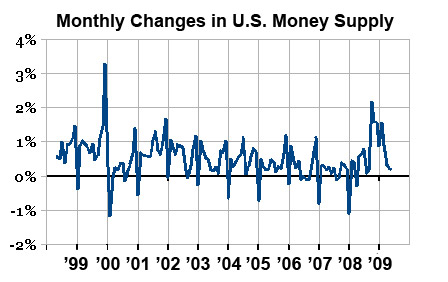
Each year (most notably 2000) money supply in US banks is increased for Christmas shopping.

One economist's analysis calculates that, despite increased overall spending, Christmas is a deadweight loss under orthodox microeconomic theory, because of the effect of gift-giving. This loss is calculated as the difference between what the gift giver spent on the item and what the gift receiver would have paid for the item. It is estimated that in 2001, Christmas resulted in a $4 billion deadweight loss in the U.S. alone. Because of complicating factors, this analysis is sometimes used to discuss possible flaws in current microeconomic theory. Other deadweight losses include the effects of Christmas on the environment and the fact that material gifts are often perceived as white elephants, imposing cost for upkeep and storage and contributing to clutter.

== History ==
In the early 90s Joel Waldfogel an assistant professor of economics at Yale University published a paper titled "The Deadweight Loss of Christmas" which stated and went into detail on the relationship between the value of an item to someone verses the actual cost of that item. This concept led to the economic term "deadweight loss" which is what we now call the loss of economic efficiency from an under or over valued item. In 1993 John L. Solow argued Waldfogel's theory with his own paper "Is it Really the Thought that Counts?" This paper gives two examples that can speak on maximum utility based on different gifts. One being that when giving a gift of money this allows others to spend on items that give them maximum utility per dollar spent and the other being that when one parties utilities depend on another's consumption of particular goods, gifts of goods can be more economically efficient than money. In 2009, Lydia Yao, who graduated from Duke University with a bachelors of science in economics, provided another point of view to the topic of gift giving, by using a model to help measure the sentimental value of a non-monetary gift versus one that cost money.

== Preparation ==
=== Christmas club ===
Christmas clubs are savings programs, the first of which were offered by various banks in the United States during the Great Depression. The concept is that bank customers deposit a set amount of money each week into a special savings account, and receive the money back at the end of the year for Christmas shopping. For decades, financial institutions competed for the holiday savings business, offering enticing premiums and advertising items such as tokens. The Dime Saving Bank of Toledo, Ohio, issued a brass token "good for 25 cents in opening a Christmas account" for 1922–1923. There were also numbered tokens issued by the Atlantic Country Trust Co. in Atlantic City, New Jersey, inscribed on the reverse: "Join our Christmas Club and Have Money When You Need It Most." In the February 2006 issue of Forbes magazine, business writer James Surowiecki summarized the accounts' appeal: "The popularity of Christmas club accounts isn't a mystery; if their money was in a regular account, people assumed they'd spend it."

=== Sears Wish Book ===
The Sears Wish Book is a popular Christmas-gift catalog released by Sears Holdings Corporation, annually in September. The catalog contains toys and other holiday-related merchandise. The first Sears Wish Book was printed in 1933, and was a separate big-book catalog from the annual Sears Christmas catalog. In the 2007 edition of the catalog, half of the total number of pages was devoted to Christmas toys and the remainder focused on other store items including appliances, tools, clothes and jewelry.

== Commercialism Christmas ==
A free market is one where buyers are willing to buy a good from a seller at that set price. This is due to supply and demand. Christmas stimulates the economy from all facets. The supply and demand of both goods and services increase around Christmas. This is due to the overconsumption and commercialization of Christmas, oftentimes causing demand to exceed supply. Retail has utilized Christmas to generate additional sales. Consumers feel the need to assimilate to the norms of the holiday, which can result in debt. Interest rates benefit the credit card industry. Outside of the retail market sales increase in other sectors of the economy such as grocery and travel. Retail sales are dependent on the supply chain of shipping and distribution, increasing revenue there as well. All of these additional products equate to additional jobs, further stimulating the economy. The demand of Christmas creates jobs that otherwise would not exist. The economic impact of commercialism Christmas is significant. Advertising for Christmas promotes shopping and emphasizes the significance of the social significance gift giving plays. The magnitude of advertising on consumers to purchase has changed the narrative for Christmas. Gratification is achieved through buying presents, traveling to be with family, and over consumption, all stimulating the economy.

== Commencement ==
=== Christmas creep ===
Christmas creep is a merchandising phenomenon in which merchants and retailers exploit the commercialized status of Christmas by moving up the start of the holiday shopping season. The term was first used in the mid-1980s. It is associated with a desire of merchants to take advantage of particularly heavy Christmas-related shopping well before Black Friday in the United States and before Hallowe’en in Canada. The term is not used in the UK and Ireland, where retailers call Christmas the "golden quarter", that is, the three months of October through December is the quarter of the year in which the retail industry hopes to make the most profit. It can apply for other holidays as well, notably St. Valentine’s Day, Easter and Mother's Day. The motivation for holiday creep is for retailers to lengthen their selling interval for seasonal merchandise in order to maximize profit and to give early-bird shoppers a head start on that holiday. However, it is not clear that this practice has been consistently beneficial for retailers.

=== United States ===
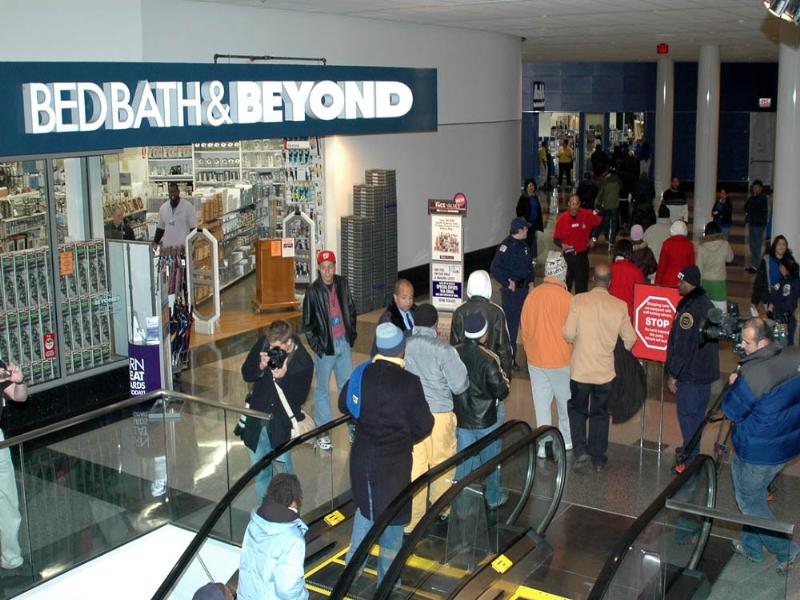
DC USA shopping center in Washington, D.C., on Black Friday

Black Friday is the Friday following Thanksgiving Day in the United States (the fourth Thursday of November), often regarded as the beginning of the Christmas shopping season. In recent years, most major retailers have opened extremely early (increasingly even on the night of Thanksgiving itself, albeit not without controversy) and offered promotional sales to kick off the holiday shopping season, similar to Boxing Day sales in many Commonwealth nations. Black Friday is not a holiday, but California and some other states observe "The Day After Thanksgiving" as a holiday for state government employees, sometimes in lieu of another federal holiday such as Columbus Day.

Many non-retail employees and schools have both Thanksgiving and the day after off, followed by a weekend, thereby increasing the number of potential shoppers. It has routinely been the busiest shopping day of the year since 2005, although news reports, which at that time were inaccurate, have described it as the busiest shopping day of the year for a much longer period of time. In recent years, countries other than America have begun observing Black Friday, including Canada, the United Kingdom and other Commonwealth nations, although the use of the term 'Black Friday' is not ubiquitous in these countries.

=== Mexico ===
El Buen Fin is an annual nationwide shopping event in Mexico, in existence since 2011 and taking place on the third weekend of November in Mexico, and the beginning of the Christmas shopping season. On this weekend, major retailers extend their store hours and offer special promotions, including extended credit terms and price promotions. The purpose of this weekend is to revive the economy by encouraging consumption and improve the quality of life of all Mexican families by implementing promotions and discounts in the prices of various products. It was inspired by the American celebration, Black Friday and emerged as an initiative of Council of Business Coordination, in association with the federal government and private sector organizations.

== Duration ==
=== Christmas market ===
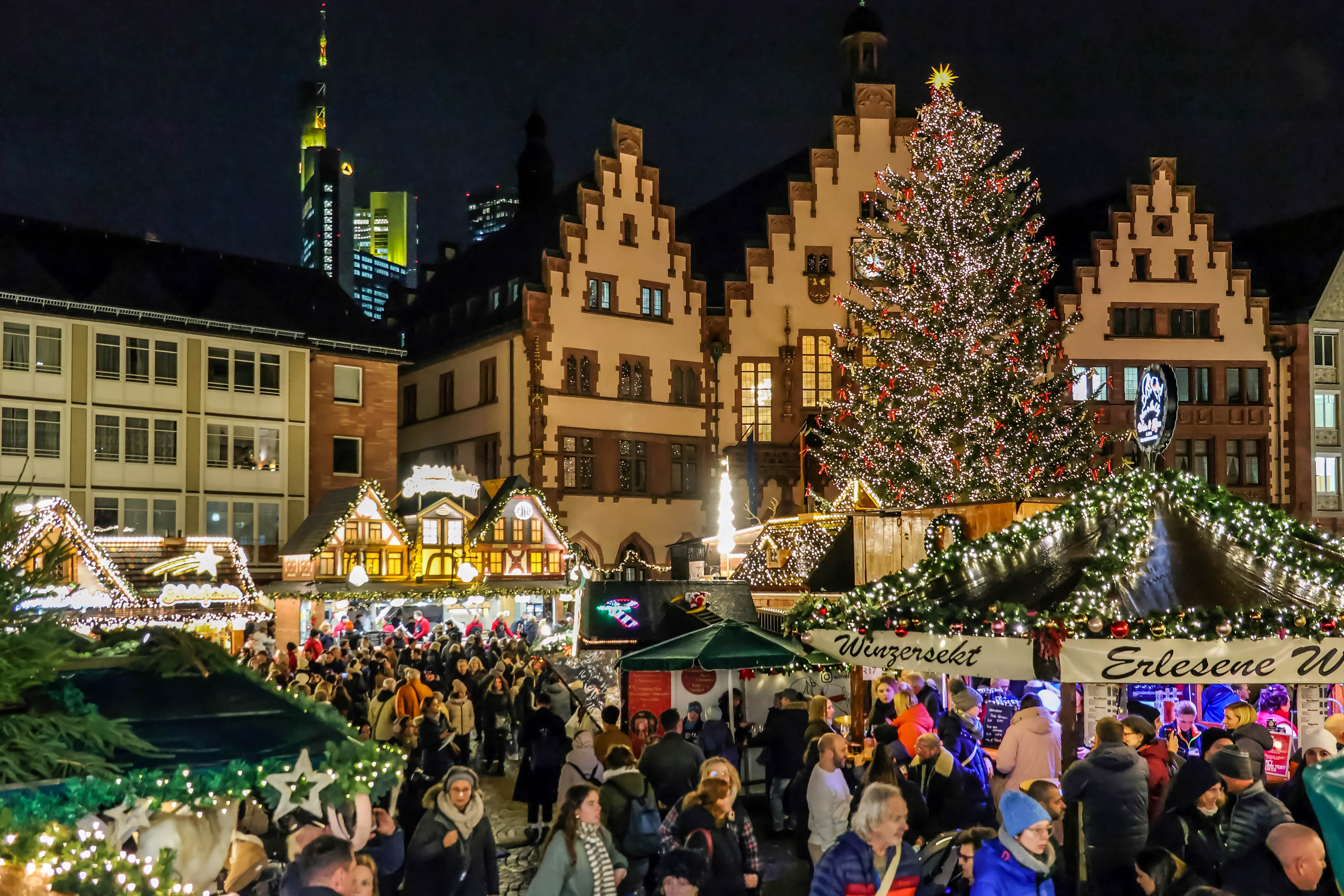
Christmas market in Frankfurt, Germany

A Christmas market is a street market associated with the celebration of Christmas during the four weeks of Advent. These markets originated in Germany, Austria, South Tyrol, North Italy and many French regions such as Alsace, Lorraine, Savoy, but are now being held in many other countries. The history of Christmas markets goes back to the Late Middle Ages in the German-speaking part of Europe and in many parts of the former Holy Roman Empire that includes many eastern region of France and Switzerland. Dresden's Striezelmarkt was first held in 1434. The Christmas markets of Bautzen (first held in 1384), Frankfurt (first mentioned in 1393) and Munich (1310) were even older. The Vienna "December market" was a kind of forerunner of the Christmas market and dates back to 1294.

=== Christmas Price Index ===
The Christmas Price Index is a tongue-in-cheek economic indicator, maintained by the U.S. bank PNC Wealth Management, which tracks the cost of the items in the carol "The Twelve Days of Christmas". PNC compiles both a "Christmas Price Index" and "The True Cost of Christmas." The "Christmas Price Index" is calculated by adding the cost of the items in the song. The "True Cost of Christmas," however, is calculated by buying a partridge in a pear tree on each of the twelve days, buying two turtle doves from the second day onward, for a total of 22 turtle doves, etc., for the complete set of 364 items.

== Conclusion ==
=== United States ===
Super Saturday is the last Saturday before Christmas, a major day of revenue for American retailers, marking the end of the shopping season they and many customers believe begins on Black Friday. Super Saturday targets last-minute shoppers. Typically the day is ridden with one-day sales in an effort to accrue more revenue than any other day in the Christmas and holiday season.

== Christmas Day ==
=== Christmas Day (Trading) Act 2004 ===
The Christmas Day (Trading) Act 2004 (c 26) is an Act of the Parliament of the United Kingdom. It prevents shops over 280 m^{2}/3,000 sq ft from opening on Christmas Day in England and Wales. Shops smaller than the limit are not affected. The Act was introduced to the House of Commons by Kevan Jones, MP for North Durham as a Private Member's Bill on 7 January 2004. The aim of the Act was to keep Christmas Day a "special" day, whereby all major retailers would be closed. Although it was traditional for major retailers to close on 25 December, some retailers, such as Woolworths, began to open some stores in the late 1990s. Both religious groups and shop worker unions were against the idea of Christmas openings, leading to pressure on the Government to pass legislation to prevent the practice. In 2006, the Scottish Parliament debated a similar law that would apply to shops in Scotland. The law was enacted in 2007 and it contained special provisions for New Year's Day retail activities too.

== Criticism ==
=== Unwanted gifts ===
Economist Joel Waldfogel noted that because of the mismatch between what the giftee values the gift and the value paid for by the giver, the gifts lose between 10% and one-third of their value; he calls it the "deadweight loss of Christmas". This leads to gifts often being returned, sold, or re-gifted. In a 2016 European online survey, 15% of respondents were unhappy about their gifts and 10% could not remember what they had received. Twenty-five percent of respondents said they had re-gifted their presents to someone else, 14% sold the items, 10% tried to return them to the store, and 5% returned the gift to the giver. Seniors were more likely to send their unwanted presents to charity, while those aged 25 to 34 "simply threw them away". Gifts that are least likely to be appreciated rely on personal tastes, and include items like perfumes and cosmetics, ornaments, and clothing.

=== Buy Nothing Christmas ===
Buy Nothing Christmas is an ongoing protest and reaction to the commercialization of the North American Christmas season. It started unofficially in 1968, when Ellie Clark and her family decided to publicly disregard the commercial aspects of the Christmas holiday. Contemporarily a movement was created to extend Adbusters' Buy Nothing Day into the entire Christmas season. Buy Nothing Christmas first became official in 2001 when a small group of Canadian Mennonites created a website and gave the movement a name.

=== Buy Nothing Day ===
Buy Nothing Day is an international day of protest against consumerism. In North America, Buy Nothing Day is held the Friday after U.S. Thanksgiving (28 November 2025; 27 November 2026; 26 November 2027); elsewhere, it is held the following day, which is the last Saturday in November. Buy Nothing Day was founded in Vancouver by artist Ted Dave and subsequently promoted by Adbusters magazine, based in Canada. The first Buy Nothing Day was organized in Canada in September 1992 "as a day for society to examine the issue of over-consumption." In 1997, it was moved to the Friday after American Thanksgiving, also called "Black Friday", which is one of the ten busiest shopping days in the United States. In 2000, advertisements by Adbusters promoting Buy Nothing Day were denied advertising time by almost all major television networks except for CNN.

== See also ==
- Category:Criticism of the commercialization of Christmas
