= GlobalGiving =

American non-profit organization

- Founded: 2002
- Founders: Mari Kuraishi and Dennis Whittle
- Type: Non-governmental organization
- Tax ID no.: 30‑0108263
- Registration no.: 30‑0108263
- Location: Washington, D.C., United States
- Region served: Worldwide
- Method: Crowdfunding
- CEO: Victoria Vrana
- Employees: 57
- Website: globalgiving.org

GlobalGiving is a 501(c)(3) non-profit organization based in the United States that provides a global crowdfunding platform for grassroots charitable projects. Since its launch in 2002, GlobalGiving's 1.9M donors have contributed more than $1 billion to support more than 40,000 projects in 175 countries.

== History ==
Before founding GlobalGiving, Mari Kuraishi and Dennis Whittle were heads of strategy and innovation at the World Bank. During their tenure, they created the world's first Innovation Marketplace in 1998, an internal competition enabling World Bank employees to propose ideas for combating global poverty. The winners received grants to develop their ideas.

In 2000, they opened the competition to the outside applicants. The Development Marketplace enabled any social entrepreneur to compete for Bank funds. The program resulted in finalists from around the world gathering in Washington, D.C., with $5 million awarded to 44 projects.

Based on the Marketplaces' success, Mari and Dennis created an Internet-based platform to facilitate a broader range of social and economic investments in developing countries. In October 2000, they left the World Bank and on February 14, 2002, GlobalGiving (formerly DevelopmentSpace) was launched.

Initial funding for GlobalGiving’s launch in February 2002 was provided by philanthropic entities including the Omidyar Network, the Skoll Foundation, the William and Flora Hewlett Foundation, and the Sall Foundation. The platform debuted through a partnership between the GlobalGiving Foundation and ManyFutures, Inc. In December 2008, ManyFutures became a formal subsidiary of the GlobalGiving Foundation, and all operations were placed under direct foundation management.

GlobalGiving has undergone several leadership transitions in recent years. Mari Kuraishi stepped down as President on November 1, 2018, and joined the organization's Board of Directors alongside co-founder and former CEO Dennis Whittle. Alix Guerrier w as CEO from 2018 until December 2021, when Donna Callejon—who has held multiple leadership positions within the organization since 2003—was appointed Interim CEO. Victoria Vrana, a longtime senior program manager at the Gates Foundation, became CEO in January 2023.

In January 2024, Russian authorities listed GlobalGiving as an "undesirable organization" under Russian law, a designation that prohibits its activities within Russia; the designation reflects broader regulatory actions against foreign NGOs and has been reported by independent news outlets.

== Structure ==
The GlobalGiving Foundation is a US-based non-profit organization that individuals and companies can donate to through the website globalgiving.org. It is supported by a network of corporate and institutional partners responsible for program implementation.

Potential donors can browse and select from a wide offering of projects that are organized by geography or by themes such as health care, the environment and education. A donor can contribute any amount using a variety of financial instruments and platforms including DAF and M-Pesa. Donors can purchase gift cards that recipients can redeem in support of a project of their choice. Companies can use the GlobalGiving platform to allow their employees, customers, partners, or foundation entities to donate directly to grassroots social and economic development projects around the world.

GlobalGiving retains a nonprofit support fee ranging from 5–12% (depending on the project type and funding source), in addition to a typical 3% third-party payment processing fee. According to independent charity evaluators, such fees help cover operational costs including vetting, project support, and administrative functions, but some donors prefer platforms with lower overhead. GlobalGiving's administrative overhead is 3.0%.

Unlike the World Bank Development Marketplace, GlobalGiving uses social networks and real-time feedback between donors and project leaders for its crowdfunding approach. Each organization pitches one or more development projects to prospective donors on the website. The funding decision for each project is crowd-sourced to the public, rather than determined by a team of experts, as in the Development Marketplace. Organizations that promote themselves through email and social media campaigns typically achieve better fundraising results. The funding and project update history for each project is public and acts as a form of reputation system for the organization implementing the project.

== Disaster relief ==
In response to natural disasters and humanitarian crises, GlobalGiving regularly launches relief funds to support nonprofits helping those in need. The Disaster Recovery Network at GlobalGiving focuses on community-led relief and recovery through local grants, advocacy, and training programs. According to GlobalGiving's former Chief Program Office, GlobalGiving has facilitated funding for relief work in response to disasters. These include Hurricane Maria in 2017, the Nepal earthquake in 2015, the Ebola outbreak in West Africa in 2014, Typhoon Haiyan in 2013, the Tohoku earthquake and tsunami in 2011, and the ongoing Syrian refugee crisis, among others. GlobalGiving has been recommended by the now-defunct USAID's Center for International Disaster Information to donors looking to support disaster relief efforts.

== Vetting ==
GlobalGiving runs a vetting program for nonprofits participating in its community. Participating organizations are evaluated on criteria such as transparency, accountability, financial stability, compliance with relevant regulations, and engagement with the GlobalGiving community.

== Reviews ==
In recent evaluations, Charity Navigator has awarded GlobalGiving a four-star rating for accountability and transparency. Historical assessments by the Better Business Bureau indicated that the organization met accreditation standards as of 2019; more current independent evaluations should be referenced where available.

== Controversy over operation in China and in Taiwan ==
GlobalGiving Representative Office in China opened in 2018 to support Chinese nonprofits. The organization has faced scrutiny from watchdogs and lawmakers regarding its compliance with Chinese government regulations, which require foreign nonprofits operating in China to register and undergo vetting by local security bureaus. The Controversy with GlobalGiving and China:

- NGO Law Compliance: To legally disburse funds to organizations operating in China, GlobalGiving partners with groups like the Shanghai People's Association for Friendship with Foreign Countries. This requires cooperation with the Administrative Office of Overseas NGOs of the Shanghai Municipal Public Security Bureau.
- National Security Concerns: Critics and some U.S. lawmakers argue that such partnerships open international NGOs and civil society groups to infiltration, monitoring, and undue influence by the Chinese Communist Party (CCP).

In May 2026, GlobalGiving informed several Taiwanese NGO's that projects currently listed under "Taiwan" would be redesignated as "Chinese Taipei." The Taiwanese organizations said GlobalGiving told them the redesignation was prompted by pressure related to the platform's planned expansion into China, a move they described as a downgrading of Taiwan's status. Most of these organizations decided to quit the platform.
