= Black Friday (partying) =

Last Friday before Christmas

Mad Friday
- Observed by: United Kingdom
- Type: Patriotic
- Celebrations: Partying
- Date: The Friday before Christmas
- Frequency: Annual
- Related to: Christmas

Mad Friday, Frantic Friday, Black Eye Friday or Break up Friday is a nickname for the Friday before Christmas Eve (24 December)—that is, the Friday after 16 December—in Great Britain.

It is the most popular night for end-of-year corporate and industrial Christmas parties, which consequently makes it one of the busiest nights in the year for ambulances and the police.

== Names ==
The term 'Mad Friday' originates as "jargon" used by NHS and Police, and has entered the popular lexicon also used by the news media.

In parts of the United Kingdom, the day has just referred to as Black Eye Friday, due to unusually high number of fights that break out in bars, pubs and clubs in the area.

It is sometimes called Builders' Friday, as it is the last day of work for many construction workers.

In some towns, mostly in Devon, United Kingdom, it is also known as Factory Friday, as it is the last day of work for many factory workers who finish work at lunchtime and spend the rest of the day socialising in pubs.

In Scotland and the North of England, the term "Mad Friday" has been around since at least the early seventies.

== Safety concerns and preventive measures ==
In anticipation of the festivities, police and emergency services officials begin their preparations for Mad Friday early in December. Ambulance Trusts around the country plan and set up mobile "drunk tanks" in city centres to help lighten the load on hospitals and police cells. Some of the higher end mobile units can treat up to 11 people at a time with eight beds, seats with restraint straps and two showers, and can cost up to £500,000. In Manchester, temporary metal detectors, or "knife arches", are erected in the busiest parts of the city to assure the public that no weapons of any kind will be tolerated.

=== Social media ===
In December 2013, Greater Manchester Police promoted the hashtag #MadMancFriday to expose the embarrassing behavior of revellers in the hopes of discouraging such extreme levels of public drunkenness on Mad Friday the next year.

Christian Nightlife Initiatives launched a "StaySafe" campaign to encourage responsible behaviour via social media.

North Yorkshire Police
(@NYorksPolice)
tweeted:

We’ve received a 999 call from a woman to report that she has ordered two portions of fish and chips but that the chip shop will only give her a sausage. This is not a 999 call. Please only use 999 in an emergency. #NYPSSF

21 December 2018

In December 2018, The Scarborough Police Service tweeted every 999 call they received to raise awareness of the tremendous strain on local resources by the wild partying. Among the hundreds of incidents reported by the people of Scarborough were a "growling" neighbour, unspecified anti-social behaviour at a fast food restaurant, "a man on the floor", a visitor repeatedly ringing a person's doorbell, physical attacks, and drunk driving.

== Table of dates ==
Black Friday takes place every year on the Friday before 24 December (Christmas Eve).

Year	Black Friday date
2016	23 December
2017	22 December
2018	21 December
2019	20 December
2020	18 December
2021	17 December
2022	23 December
2023	22 December
2024	20 December
2025	19 December
2026	18 December
