= Buy Nothing Day =

Day of protest against consumerism

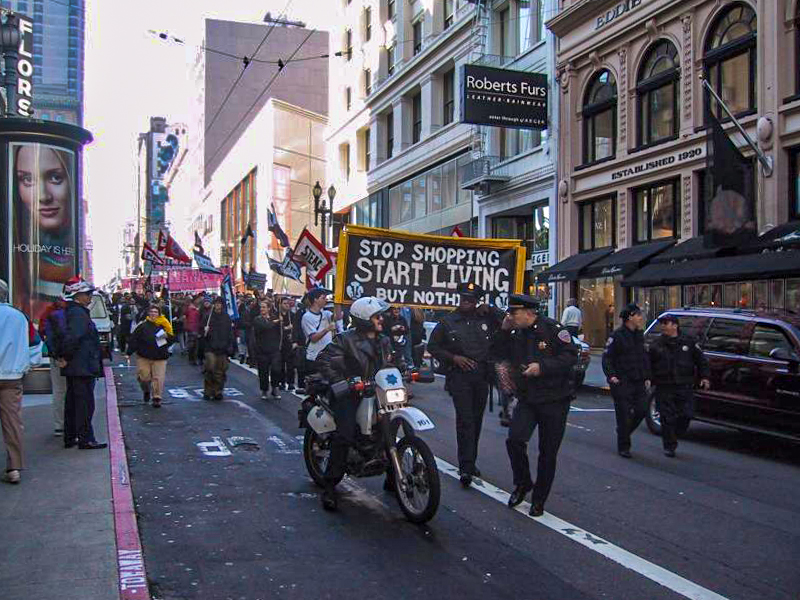
- Buy Nothing Day demonstration in San Francisco, November 2000
- Type: Cultural
- Significance: Protest against consumerism
- Date: Day after U.S. Thanksgiving
- 2025 date: November 28
- 2026 date: November 27
- 2027 date: November 26
- 2028 date: November 24
- Frequency: Annual
- First time: September 1992; 34 years ago
- Related to: Black Friday, Cyber Monday, Green Monday, Small Business Saturday, Giving Tuesday, Thanksgiving

Buy Nothing Day is a day of protest against consumerism. In North America, the United Kingdom, Finland and Sweden, Buy Nothing Day is held the day after U.S. Thanksgiving, concurrent with Black Friday; elsewhere, it is held the following day, which is also the last Saturday of November.

Created by artist Ted Dave and promoted by magazine and nonprofit Adbusters, Buy Nothing Day encourages people not to shop for one day. Participants may participate in a variety of anti-consumerist and philanthropic activities, such as donating winter coats or marching through stores. Some activists have also extended Buy Nothing Day to cover the entire Christmas shopping season. As of 2001, Buy Nothing Day was observed in over 35 countries. In the late 1990s, Adbusters created a TV commercial to promote Buy Nothing Day in the US, but most television stations refused to air it. Some commentators, particularly business groups, have criticized the event, claiming that it is economically destructive.

== History ==
The holiday was invented by Canadian artist Ted Dave. The Independent journalist Joe Sommerlad traced supporters' philosophy back to the 1899 text The Theory of the Leisure Class, which argued that consumerism was left over from the feudal era and should be discontinued. Soon thereafter, Canadian magazine and nonprofit Adbusters began promoting the day as well. It then spread to the United States, then internationally. It began to be observed in Japan in 1999, and by 2001 was observed in 35 countries around the world.

The first Buy Nothing Day was organized in Canada in September 1992 "as a day for society to examine the issue of overconsumption." In 1997, it was moved to the Friday after American Thanksgiving, also called "Black Friday", which is one of the ten busiest shopping days in the United States.

== Activities ==
=== Activism ===
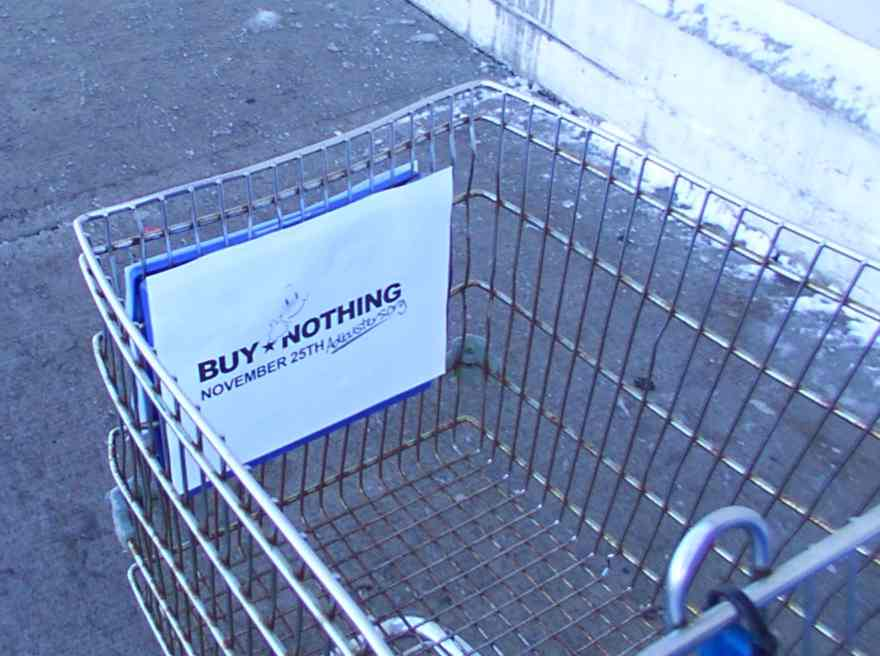
A Buy Nothing Day sign attached to a Walmart shopping cart by an activist

Beginning in the 1990s, Adbusters readers began engaging in culture jamming activities on Buy Nothing Day. Various gatherings and forms of protest have been used to draw attention to overconsumption:

- Credit card cutting parties
- Handing out flyers: Participants gather in busy city areas to hand out flyers to inform passerby of the movement and anti-consumerism
- Forming long lines of people pushing empty shopping carts around stores (referred to as "Whirly-Mart" by Adbusters)
- Buy Nothing Coat Exchange: Four states, including Utah, hold winter coat exchange programs as an alternative to Black Friday shopping.
- Walking through streets or malls in zombie makeup

=== Commercials ===
Beginning in the 1990s, Adbusters produced a commercial promoting Buy Nothing Day. The ad depicted North Americans as a belching pig, to symbolize their overconsumption, and cited statistics comparing North Americans' consumption to those of people in Mexico, China, and India. The ad also refers to "A world that could die because of the way we North Americans live". However, Adbusters struggled to get the ad on the air, with MTV, ABC, CBS, and NBC refusing to show it. Only CNN, as well as some local stations, agreed to air the ad. In 1997, CBS justified their refusal by citing "the current economic policy in the United States". Kalle Lasn, the co-founder of Adbusters, questioned why MTV was comfortable airing gangsta rap and sexualized videos, but would not run the ad. In 2001, Slate advertising critic Rob Walker opined that Adbusters shouldn't "suddenly change their convictions" following the September 11 attacks, but should consider airing a new ad, especially in light of the "world that could die" language.

== Buy Nothing Christmas ==
Buy Nothing Christmas started unofficially in 1968, when Ellie Clark and her family decided to publicly disregard the commercial aspects of the Christmas holiday. Contemporarily, a movement was created to extend Adbusters' Buy Nothing Day into the entire Christmas season. Buy Nothing Christmas first became official in 2001 when a small group of Canadian Mennonites created a website and gave the movement a name. Adbusters in 2011 renamed the event Occupy Xmas, a reference to the Occupy movement.

Buy Nothing Day was first joined with Adbusters' Buy Nothing Christmas campaign. Shortly after, Lauren Bercovitch, the production manager at Adbusters Media Foundation, publicly embraced the principles of Occupy Xmas, advocating "something as simple as buying locally—going out and putting money into your local economy—or making your Christmas presents". Previously, the central message of Occupy Xmas and Occupy Christmas differed in that Occupy Xmas called for a "Buy Nothing Christmas" and Occupy Christmas called for support of local economy, artists, and craftspeople in holiday shopping. The union of these ideologies calls for a Buy Nothing Day to kick off a season of supporting local economy and family. Adbusters editor Kalle Lasn claimed in 2006 that the holiday was celebrated in over 65 countries around the world.

== Opposition ==
In 2001, during the aftermath of the September 11 attacks, Adbusters encountered an increase in opposition to Buy Nothing Day, with some Americans believing that consumerism was critical to rehabilitating the US economy. In 2002, the president of the Maryland Retailers' Association opined that supporters of the holiday should "get in the holiday spirit" and claimed that their activities could hurt retail workers financially. That year, the director of communications for the National Association of Manufacturers called Buy Nothing Day "a very bad idea" and accused it of being "a protest against modernity".

In 2012, Andrew Simms published an opinion piece in The Guardian arguing that abstinence-focused movements fail and that the economy was already suffering from too little demand, instead advocating that people buy better-quality goods.

== In popular culture ==
English alternative rock band Chumbawamba recorded a song titled "Buy Nothing Day" for their 2004 studio album Un. AllMusic critic Johnny Loftus deemed it an "endorsement" of Adbusters' movement, while fellow AllMusic critic Chris Nickson deemed it a "musing on greed" on their 2007 live album, Get On with It. In 2019, actress Shailene Woodley tweeted her support for the holiday.

== See also ==
- Anti-consumerism
- Car-Free Days
- Circular Monday, a grassroots movement, database and shopping day for circular consumption
- Giving Tuesday
- Homo consumericus
- The Story of Stuff (2007 film)
