= MTV Hustle =

- Genre: Music
- Presented by: Gaelyn Mendonca (season 1); Krissann Barretto (season 2); Wicked Sunny (season 3); Super Mannik (season 3); Jasmeet Singh Bhatia (season 4); Talha Siddiqui (season 4); Samarth Jurel (season 5)
- Judges: Raftaar (season 1 and 4); Nucleya (season 1); Raja Kumari (season 1); Badshah (season 2–3 and 5); Ikka Singh (season 4)
- Country of origin: India
- Original language: Hindi
- No. of seasons: 5
- No. of episodes: 100

Production
- Production company: Colosseum Media

Original release
- Network: MTV India
- Release: 10 August 2019 – present

MTV Hustle is an Indian rap and hip-hop reality show. Aspiring rappers battle it out to become India's biggest hip-hop star. The show airs on MTV India.

The first season premiered on 10 August 2019, and was judged by Raftaar, Nucleya and Raja Kumari, accompanied by host Gaelyn Mendonca.

The second season premiered on 3 September 2022. Hosted by Krissann Barretto, the show was judged by Badshah along with four squad bosses - EPR Iyer, Dino James, Dee MC and King Rocco.

The third season premiered on 21 October 2023. Hosted by Wicked Sunny and Super Mannik, the show was judged by Badshah for the second time consecutively, along with four squad bosses - EPR Iyer, Dino James, Dee MC and Ikka.

The fourth season premiered on 19 October 2024. Hosted by MC Talha and MC Jizzy, the show was judged by Raftaar and Ikka, along with four squad bosses - EPR Iyer, Dino James, Dee MC and Raga.

The fifth season premiered on August 8, 2026, on MTV India and Jio Hotstar. This season also streamed on Netflix for global audience.

On 10 December 2023, during episode 16 of season 3, Samantha Ruth Prabhu announced the Tamil edition of MTV Hustle Namma Pettai.

== Series ==
As of 2026, there have been five seasons of the show.

Season	1	2	3	4	5
Premiere date	10 August 2019	3 September 2022	21 October 2023	19 October 2024	8 August 2026
Finale date	13 October 2019	6 November 2022	24 December 2023	22 December 2024	11 October 2026
Winner	M-Zee Bella	MC Square	Uday	Lashcurry	Dhadkan
Runner-up	EPR	Paradox	Bassick	Naam Sujal	WhysoKai
OG Hustler	Shloka	Gravity	100RBH	Siyaahi	-
Winner Squad	—N/a	EPR Rebels	Dee MC Dynamites	Raga Ragers	Para Troopers
Squad of the Season	—N/a	—N/a	—N/a	—N/a	Para Troopers
Host(s)	Gaelyn Mendonca	Krissann Barretto	Super Manikk	MC Talha	Samarth Jurel
Host(s)	Gaelyn Mendonca	Krissann Barretto	Wicked Sunny	MC Jizzy	Samarth Jurel
Judge(s)	Nucleya	Badshah		Raftaar	Badshah
Judge(s)	Raftaar	Badshah		Ikka Singh	Badshah
Judge(s)	Raja Kumari	Badshah		Ikka Singh	Badshah
Squad Bosses	—N/a	EPR Iyer			
Squad Bosses	—N/a	Dee MC			Agsy
Squad Bosses	—N/a	Dino James			Paraadox
Squad Bosses	—N/a	King	Ikka Singh	Raga	MC Square

== Season 1 ==
MTV Hustle 1 premiered on 10 August 2019. M-Zee Bella was declared winner.

• Judges

- Raftaar
- Nucleya
- Raja Kumari

• Host

- Gaelyn Mendonca

=== Contestants ===
Contestant	Stage Name	Finish	Place
Deepak Singh	M-Zee Bella	Episode 20	Winner
Santhanam Srinivasan Iyer	EPR	Episode 20	Runner-up
Rohit Kumar Chaudhary	RCR	Episode 20	3
Arpan Kumar Chandel	King	Episode 20	4
Rahul Kumar Das (Karn)	Shloka	Episode 20	5
Agrita Dhawan	Agsy	Episode 18	6/7
Gaurav Mankoti	Void	Episode 18	6/7
Riya Panchal	Raeza	Episode 18	8
Lakshya Bhardwaj	Firaag	Episode 17	9
Himanshu Joshi	Himan	Episode 16	10
Sagar Shetty	Shetty Saa	Episode 14	11
Akshay Kumar	Zack	Episode 12	12
Hemant Dhyani	MC Heam	Episode 10	13
Nikita R Sharma	Star Nick	Episode 8	14
Neeru Pal	NeeRu Pal	Episode 6	15

Male
Female

=== Summary ===
Contestant	Week 1	Week 2	Week 3	Week 4	Week 5	Week 6	Week 7	Week 8	Week 9		Week 10
M-Zee-Bella	Selected	SAFE	BEST	SAFE	SAFE	BEST	BEST	HIGH	Finalist		Winner
EPR	Top 15	BEST	HIGH	SAFE	SAFE	HIGH	HIGH	HIGH	Finalist		Runner-up
RCR	Selected	HIGH	HIGH	BEST	HIGH	HIGH	BEST	BEST	Qualified		TOP 5
King	Top 15	HIGH	SAFE	HIGH	HIGH	HIGH	HIGH	BEST	Qualified		TOP 5
Shloka	Selected	HIGH	HIGH	BEST	HIGH	SAFE	HIGH	HIGH	BEST	Qualified	TOP 5
Agsy	Top 15	SAFE	SAFE	SAFE	BEST	SAFE	HIGH	BTM2	ELIM		Guest
Void	Top 15	SAFE	HIGH	SAFE	HIGH	LOW	HIGH	LOW	ELIM		Guest
Raeza	Selected	SAFE	SAFE	HIGH	HIGH	HIGH	BTM2	SAFE	ELIM		Guest
Firaag	Selected	SAFE	LOW	LOW	HIGH	LOW	SAFE	LOW	ELIM		Guest
Himan	Selected	SAFE	SAFE	BTM2	SAFE	BTM2	SAFE	ELIM			Guest
Shetty Saa	Selected	SAFE	HIGH	LOW	SAFE	LOW	ELIM				
Zack	Selected	SAFE	SAFE	LOW	BTM2	ELIM					Guest
MC Heam	Selected	SAFE	HIGH	SAFE	ELIM						Guest
Star Nick	Selected	SAFE	BTM2	ELIM							Guest
NeeRu Pal	Selected	SAFE	ELIM								

==== Notes ====
Week 2	Best Performer	Safe				
Week 3; 5–8	Best Performer	Received 4 Green Buzzers	Safe	Received 4 Red Buzzers	Bottom 2	Eliminated
Week 4	Best Performer	Received 3 Safe Buzzers	Safe	Received 0 Safe Buzzers	Bottom 2	Eliminated
Week 9	Best Performer	Qualified		Finalist		Eliminated
Week 10	Winner	Runner-up	Finalist and eliminated during the Final			Guest

=== Weekly summary ===
Key	Green Buzzer	Red Buzzer	Best Performer	Safe	Bottom 2	Eliminated

==== Week 3 (Episode 5–6) ====
Order	Rapper	Judges			Guest Judge	Judges' Decision	Public Voting	Studio Audience's Decision
Order	Rapper	Nucleya	Raftaar	Raja	Salim	Judges' Decision	Public Voting	Studio Audience's Decision
1	Agsy					Unsafe	Safe	-
2	EPR					Safe	-	-
3	Shloka					Safe	-	-
4	Firaag					Unsafe	Safe	-
5	King					Unsafe	Safe	-
6	Himan					Unsafe	Safe	-
7	Void					Safe	-	-
8	Star Nick					Unsafe	Bottom 2	(114 dB) Advanced
9	M-Zee-Bella						-	-
10	RCR					Safe	-	
11	Raeza					Unsafe	Safe	-
12	Zack					Unsafe	Safe	-
13	MC Heam					Safe	-	-
14	NeeRu Pal					Unsafe	Bottom 2	(109 dB) Eliminated
15	Shetty Saa					Safe	-	-

==== Week 4 (Episode 7–8) ====
Face-off No.	Order	Rapper	To Face-off Against:	Remix of Song	Judges			Judges' Decision	Public Voting	Studio Audience's Decision
Face-off No.	Order	Rapper	To Face-off Against:	Remix of Song	Nucleya	Raftaar	Raja	Judges' Decision	Public Voting	Studio Audience's Decision
1	1	M-Zee-Bella	Shetty Saa	Naah	(Note: Shetty Saa forgot the lyrics during performance. So, M-Zee-Bella was automatically safe.)			Safe	-	-
1	2	Shetty Saa	Not eligible	Proper Patola	(Note: Shetty Saa forgot the lyrics during performance. So, M-Zee-Bella was automatically safe.)			Unsafe	Safe	-
2	1	King	RCR	She Move It Like				Unsafe	Safe	-
2	2	RCR	Not eligible	Ae Dil Hai Mushkil				Safe	-	-
3	1	Himan	Not eligible	Kamariya				Unsafe	Bottom 2	(107 dB) Advanced
3	2	Shloka	Himan	Jiya Tu					-	-
4	1	Agsy	MC Heam	Lahore				Safe	-	-
4	2	MC Heam	Not eligible	Shehar Ki Ladki				Unsafe	Safe	-
5	1	EPR	Not eligible	Suit Suit				Safe	-	-
5	2	Void	EPR	Bekhayali				safe	Safe	-
6	1	Firaag	Not eligible	O Saki Saki	(Note: Both Firaag & Zack forgot the lyrics during performance. Therefore, neither of them were saved by the Judges.)			Unsafe	Safe	-
6	2	Zack	Firaag	Tareefan	(Note: Both Firaag & Zack forgot the lyrics during performance. Therefore, neither of them were saved by the Judges.)			Unsafe	Safe	-
7	1	Star Nick	Not eligible	Paagal				Unsafe	Bottom 2	(104 dB) Eliminated
7	2	Raeza	Not eligible	Chogada				Safe	-	-

==== Week 5 (Episode 9–10) ====
Order	Rapper	Judges			Guest Judge	Judges' Decision	Public Voting	Studio Audience's Decision
Order	Rapper	Nucleya	Raftaar	Raja	Naezy	Judges' Decision	Public Voting	Studio Audience's Decision
1	EPR					Unsafe	Safe	-
2	Agsy						-	-
3	Firaag					Safe	-	-
4	M-Zee-Bella					Unsafe	Safe	-
5	Shetty Saa					Unsafe	Safe	-
6	RCR					Safe	-	-
7	Himan					Unsafe	Safe	-
8	Void					Safe	-	-
9	King					Safe	-	-
10	Shloka					Safe	-	-
11	Raeza					Safe	-	-
12	MC Heam					Unsafe	Bottom 2	(101 dB) Eliminated
13	Zack					Unsafe	Bottom 2	(121 dB) Advanced

==== Week 6 (Episode 11–12) ====
Order	Rapper	Judges			Guest Judge	Judges' Decision	Public Voting	Studio Audience's Decision
Order	Rapper	Nucleya	Raftaar	Raja	Brodha V	Judges' Decision	Public Voting	Studio Audience's Decision
1	RCR					Safe	-	-
2	Shloka					Unsafe	Safe	-
3	M-Zee-Bella						-	-
4	Raeza					Safe	-	-
5	Agsy					Unsafe	Safe	-
6	Shetty Saa					Unsafe	Safe	-
7	Firaag					Unsafe	Safe	-
8	King					Safe	-	-
9	Himan					Bottom 2 (Note: Himan was chosen by the judges to be in the Bottom 2 with Zack, the least voted contestant by the public.)	N/A	(113 dB) Advanced
10	EPR					Safe	-	-
11	Void					Unsafe	Safe	-
12	Zack					Unsafe	Bottom 2	(105 dB) Eliminated

==== Week 7 (Episode 13–14) ====
Order	Rapper	Judges			Guest Judge	Judges' Decision	Public Voting	Studio Audience's Decision
Order	Rapper	Nucleya	Raftaar	Raja	Shekhar	Judges' Decision	Public Voting	Studio Audience's Decision
1	King					Safe	-	-
2	M-Zee-Bella						-	-
3	RCR					Safe	-	-
4	Shetty Saa					Bottom 2 (Note: Shetty Saa was chosen by the judges to be in the Bottom 2 with Raeza, the least voted contestant by the public.)	N/A	(112 dB) Eliminated
5	Agsy					Safe	-	-
6	Firaag					Unsafe	Safe	-
7	Void					Safe	-	-
8	Shloka					Safe	-	-
9	Himan					Unsafe	Safe	-
10	EPR					Safe	-	-
11	Raeza					Unsafe	Bottom 2	(113 dB) Advanced

==== Week 8 (Episode 15–16) ====
Order	Rapper	Judges			Guest Judge	Judges' Decision	Public Voting	Studio Audience's Decision	Judges' Choice to go directly to the Finale
Order	Rapper	Nucleya	Raftaar	Raja	Bobby	Judges' Decision	Public Voting	Studio Audience's Decision	Judges' Choice to go directly to the Finale
1	King						-	-	Didn't make it
2	Void					Unsafe	Safe	-	-
3	M-Zee-Bella					Safe	-	-	1st Finalist
4	Himan					Bottom 2 (Note: Right after Himan's performance, judges decided Himan to directly be in the Bottom 2.)	N/A	(103 dB) Eliminated	-
5	Raeza					Unsafe	Safe	-	-
6	EPR					Safe	-	-	2nd Finalist
7	Shloka					Safe	-	-	Didn't make it
8	Agsy					Unsafe	Bottom 2	(110 db) Advanced	-
9	RCR					Safe	-	-	Didn't make it
10	Firaag					Unsafe	Safe	-	-

==== Week 9 (Episode 17–18) ====
Order	Rapper	Judges			Guest Judge	Judges' Decision
Order	Rapper	Nucleya	Raftaar	Raja	Brodha V	Judges' Decision
1	Void					Eliminated
2	King					4th Finalist
3	Firaag					Eliminated
4	Agsy					Eliminated
5	RCR					5th Finalist
6	Shloka					3rd Finalist
7	Raeza					Eliminated
Finalist	EPR	Immune				
Finalist	M-Zee-Bella	Immune				

Special Performance by the first two finalists EPR & M-Zee-Bella along with Raftaar & Brodha V in Episode 18.

==== Week 10 (Episode 19–20) ====
Order	Rapper	Judges' Decision
1	RCR	Eliminated
2	M-Zee-Bella	Top 2
3	King	Eliminated
4	Shloka	Eliminated
5	EPR	Top 2

After Top 5 finalists performed, judges had to decide two of them for the Final Battle Round for the Title.

Order	Rapper	Result
1	EPR	Runner-up
2	M-Zee-Bella	Winner

=== Guests ===
Week	Episode(s)	Guest Judge	Episode	Guest Appearance
1 (Auditions)	1-2	Naezy		none
3	5-6	Salim Merchant	6	Raga
4	7-8	Tanishk Bagchi	8	Zara Khan
5	9-10	Naezy	10	KKG (Kaala Kurta Gang)
6	11-12	Brodha V		none
7	13-14	Shekhar Ravjiani	13	Rasmeet Kaur
7	13-14	Shekhar Ravjiani	14	Shivang Dubey
8	15-16	Bobby Friction	15	L-Fresh the Lion & MC Mirrah
8	15-16	Bobby Friction	16	Sourabh Acharya & Mad-Z
9	17-18	Brodha V	17	FOTTY SEVEN & Kaam Bhaari
9	17-18	Brodha V	18	Slow Cheetah & Spitfire
10 (Final)	none		19	Shekhar Ravjiani
10 (Final)	none		19	Naezy
10 (Final)	none		19	L-Fresh the Lion & MC Mirrah
10 (Final)	none		19	MC Altaf, Big Deal, Fejo, Big Smyle, Raiychu & Island Warrior
10 (Final)	none		20	Kalamkaar - Deep Kalsi, Harjas, Krsna & Karma
10 (Final)	none		20	KKG - Sikander Kahlon, Rob C & Sady Immortal
10 (Final)	none		20	Sukrut & Brodha V

== Season 2 ==
=== Judges and host ===
Badshah replaced the entire judge panel of season 1, along with four squad bosses Dino James, Dee MC, EPR and King, out of which, the latter two competed as contestants in the previous season. Krissann Barretto hosted the show. MC Square was declared as the winner.

=== Contestants ===
Contestant	Stage Name	Finish	Place
Abhishek Bainsla	MC Square	Episode 20	Winner
Tanishq Singh	Paradox	Episode 20	Runner-up
Nihar Hodawadekar	Nazz	Episode 20	3
Akshay Poojary	Gravity	Episode 20	4
Shubham Pal	Spectra	Episode 20	5
Srushti Tawade	Srushti Tawade	Episode 18	6-10
Vikalp Dwivedi	Wicked Sunny	Episode 18	6-10
Mukul Monga	Super Manikk	Episode 18	6-10
Mahendra Singh Khatri	UK Rapi Boy	Episode 18	6-10
Aarya Jadhao	QK	Episode 18	6-10
Anubhav Shukla	Panther	Episode 16	11-12
Tamojit Chatterjee	MC Headshot	Episode 16	11-12
Gagandeep Singh	GD47	Episode 14	13
Laksh Parihar	LXSH	Episode 10	14-15
Aditya Nirgude	RHYME	Episode 10	14-15
Gaurav Khullar	Khullar G	Episode 8	16
Ugen Namgyal Bhutia	UNB	Episode 4	17-20
Saquib Ansari	Apka Bobby	Episode 4	17-20
Firoza Khan	Khanzaadi	Episode 4	17-20
Shlok Bharadwaj	Shlovij	Episode 4	17-20

Male
Female

=== Squads ===
==== Episode 1-4 ====
Dee MC Dynamites	Dino Warriors	EPR Rebels	King Slayers
Spectra	~~Super Manikk~~	MC Headshot	Paradox
QK	Wicked Sunny	Nazz	UK Rapi Boy
GD 47	Gravity	MC Square	~~UNB~~
~~Lxsh~~	~~Srushti~~	~~Khanzaadi~~	~~Panther~~
~~Rhyme~~	~~Apka Bobby~~	~~Shlovij~~	Khullar G
Super Manikk	Lxsh	Panther	Rhyme

==== Episode 5-20 ====
Dee MC Dynamites	Dino Warriors	EPR Rebels	King Slayers
Spectra	Srushti	MC Square	Paradox
QK	Gravity	Nazz	UK Rapi Boy
Super Manikk	Wicked Sunny	Panther	RHYME
GD 47	LXSH	MC Headshot	Khullar G

==== Squad of the Week ====
Week	Squad of the Week
Week 3	Dee MC Dynamites
Week 4	EPR Rebels
Week 5	EPR Rebels
Week 6	Dino Warriors
Week 7	Dino Warriors
Week 8	King Slayers

=== Summary ===
Squad	Contestant	Week 1–2	Week 3	Week 4	Week 5	Week 6	Week 7	Week 8	Week 9	Week 10	Total	Final ranking
EPR Rebels	MC Square	SAFE	29	29	29	30	30	40	SAFE	Winner	187	1
King Slayers	Paradox	SAFE	26	24	27	23	29	40	SAFE	Runner-up	169	2
EPR Rebels	Nazz	SAFE	22	27	30	30	21	40	SAFE	3rd Place	170	3
Dino Warriors	Gravity	SAFE	29	29	27	30	30	34	SAFE	TOP 5	179	4
Dee MC Dynamites	Spectra	SAFE	30	20	28	23	24	35	SAFE	TOP 5	160	5
Dino Warriors	Srushti	SAFE	29	30	29	30	30	40	ELIM	Guest	188	6
Dino Warriors	Wicked Sunny	SAFE	24	23	29	28	23	38	ELIM	Guest	165	7
King Slayers	UK Rapi Boy	SAFE	24	19	24	29	21	39	ELIM	Guest	158	10
Dee MC Dynamites	Super Manikk	SAFE	28	26	23	21	23	38	ELIM	Guest	151	11
Dee MC Dynamites	QK	SAFE	22	23	21	20	24	39	ELIM	Guest	149	12
EPR Rebels	MC Headshot	SAFE	28	26	27	25	24	34		Guest	164	8
EPR Rebels	Panther	BTM6	17	28	28	29	25	35		Guest	162	9
Dee MC Dynamites	GD 47	SAFE	28	30	22	30	20+2=22			Guest	137	13
Dino Warriors	Lxsh	SAFE	23	24	18					Guest	65	14
King Slayers	Rhyme	BTM6	17	18	23					Guest	58	15
King Slayers	Khullar G	SAFE	18	18						Guest	36	16
King Slayers	UNB	ELIM									0	17-20
EPR Rebels	Shlovij	ELIM									0	17-20
EPR Rebels	Khanzaadi	ELIM									0	17-20
Dino Warriors	Apka Bobby	ELIM									0	17-20

==== Notes ====
"Bold Numbers" represent "Radio Hits" received from Badshah
Best Performer of the week
Received positive critics and was declared safe
Safe
Received negative critics and was in Danger Zone but was declared safe
Bottom
Eliminated
Finalist
Runner-up
Winner
Guest

=== Weekly summary ===
==== Week 1-2 (Episode 1–4) ====
For weeks 1 & 2, after each contestant performed, Badshah decides which squad to be assigned to. But, the Squad Bosses can sound the horn and ask the contestant to join their squad.

Key	Squad Boss horn to join their squad	Badshah choice to assign squad	Radio Ready Performer	Bottom 6

Order	Rapper	Judge	Squad Bosses				Squad		Result
Order	Rapper	Badshah	Dee MC	Dino James	EPR	King	Assigned by Badshah	Chosen by Contestant	Result
1	Super Manikk						Dino Warriors	-	Radio Ready
2	Spectra						-	Dee MC Dynamites	Sealed by Squad Boss
3	Paradox						King Slayers	-	Sealed by Squad Boss
4	MC Headshot						-	EPR Rebels	Sealed by Squad Boss
5	QK						-	Dee MC Dynamites	Sealed by Squad Boss
6	Wicked Sunny						-	Dino Warriors	Sealed by Squad Boss
7	Nazz						EPR Rebels	-	Radio Ready
8	MC Square						-	EPR Rebels	Sealed by Squad Boss
9	Gravity						-	Dino Warriors	Sealed by Squad Boss
10	UK Rapi Boy						King Slayers	-	Radio Ready
11	GD 47						Dee MC Dynamites	-	Radio Ready
12	UNB						King Slayers	-	Bottom 6
13	Khanzaadi						EPR Rebels	-	Bottom 6
14	Panther						King Slayers	-	Bottom 6
15	Khullar G						-	King Slayers	Sealed by Squad Boss
16	Lxsh						Dee MC Dynamites	-	Radio Ready
17	Srushti						Dino Warriors	-	Radio Ready
18	Apka Bobby						Dino Warriors	-	Bottom 6
19	Shlovij						EPR Rebels	-	Bottom 6
20	Rhyme						Dee MC Dynamites	-	Bottom 6

===== Battleground 2.0 =====
The bottom six contestant compete one vs one in the Battleground. Only two moved-on to the next round.

After three battles, the two squads EPR Rebels and King Slayers had to choose one contestant to join their squad. UNB was not chosen and was eliminated.

Key	Chosen to join their Squad	Not chosen by Squad Boss	Survived	Eliminated

Battle No.	Rapper (Squad)			Squad Bosses				Survived	Eliminated
Battle No.	Rapper (Squad)			Dee MC	Dino James	EPR	King	Survived	Eliminated
1	Apka Bobby (Dino Warriors)	vs.	Panther (King Slayers)					Panther	Apka Bobby
2	Khanzaadi (EPR Rebels)	vs.	UNB (King Slayers)					UNB	Khanzaadi
3	Shlovij (EPR Rebels)	vs.	Rhyme (Dee MC Dynamites)					Rhyme	Shlovij

===== Snatch Battle =====
In this battle the squad bosses compete against each other for a contestant.

Battle No.	Squad Boss	Rapper to snatch	Votes	Winner	Result
1	Dino James	GD 47 (Dee MC Dynamites)	1	Dee MC	Super Manikk moved to Dee MC Dynamites. And Lxsh moved to Dino Warriors.
1	vs.			Dee MC	Super Manikk moved to Dee MC Dynamites. And Lxsh moved to Dino Warriors.
1	Dee MC	Super Manikk (Dino Warriors)	2	Dee MC	Super Manikk moved to Dee MC Dynamites. And Lxsh moved to Dino Warriors.

==== Week 3 (Episode 5–6) ====
From this week, the squad bosses scored after each performance.

Also the public voting were open, with the votes effecting the next week's elimination.

Key	"Radio Hit" from Bashah	Best Performer	Safe

Order	Squad	Rapper	Judge	Squad Bosses				Total Score	Judges' Decision
Order	Squad	Rapper	Badshah	Dee MC	Dino James	EPR	King	Total Score	Judges' Decision
1	King Slayers	Paradox		8	8	10	-	26	Safe
2	Dino Warriors	Wicked Sunny		7	-	7	10	24	Safe
3	EPR Rebels	MC Square		10	9	-	10	29	Safe
4	Dee MC Dynamites	Super Manikk		-	9	9	10	28	Safe
5	Dee MC Dynamites	Spectra		-	10	10	10	30	
6	Dino Warriors	Lxsh		8	-	7	8	23	Safe
7	King Slayers	Khullar G		4	8	6	-	18	Safe
8	EPR Rebels	Panther		7	6	-	4	17	Safe
9	EPR Rebels	MC Headshot		9	9	-	10	28	Safe
10	Dino Warriors	Srushti		9	-	10	10	29	Safe
11	Dee MC Dynamites	GD 47		-	10	9	9	28	Safe
12	Dino Warriors	Gravity		10	-	9	10	29	Safe
13	Dee MC Dynamites	QK		-	8	7	7	22	Safe
14	King Slayers	UK Rapi Boy		8	8	8	-	24	Safe
15	EPR Rebels	Nazz		8	7	-	7	22	Safe
16	King Slayers	Rhyme		5	7	5	-	17	Safe

==== Week 4 (Episode 7–8) ====
Last week's squad of the week, Dee MC had to choose one of the two random cards (Immunity Card: to save one Rapper from elimination & Danger Card: to put one Rapper up for elimination from other squad). She got the Danger Zone and chose Lxsh.

Key	"Radio Hit" from Bashah	Best Performer	Immunity Card	Danger Card	Immune	Safe	Danger Zone	Bottom 2	Eliminated

Order	Squad	Rapper	Judge	Squad Bosses				Total Score	Judges' Decision	Public Voting	Battle Result
Order	Squad	Rapper	Badshah	Dee MC	Dino James	EPR	King	Total Score	Judges' Decision	Public Voting	Battle Result
1	EPR Rebels	Nazz		9	9	-	9	27	Immune	-	-
2	Dino Warriors	Srushti		10	-	10	10	30	Safe	-	-
3	EPR Rebels	Panther		8	10	-	10	28	Immune	-	-
4	King Slayers	Paradox		9	9	6	-	24	Safe	-	-
5	Dee MC Dynamites	GD 47		-	10	10	10	30		-	-
6	EPR Rebels	MC Square		10	9	-	10	29	Immune	-	-
7	Dee MC Dynamites	Spectra		-	7	6	8	20	Safe	-	-
8	Dino Warriors	Wicked Sunny		8	-	7	8	23	Safe	-	-
9	King Slayers	Rhyme		5	8	5	-	18	Danger Zone	Bottom 2	Safe
10	EPR Rebels	MC Headshot		9	8	-	9	26	Safe	-	-
11	Dino Warriors	Gravity		10	-	9	10	29	Immune	-	-
12	Dee MC Dynamites	QK		-	8	6	9	23	Safe	-	-
13	Dino Warriors	Lxsh		7	-	8	9	24		Safe	-
14	King Slayers	Khullar G		6	6	6	-	18	Danger Zone	Bottom 2	Eliminated
15	Dee MC Dynamites	Super Manikk		-	9	8	9	26	Safe	-	-
16	King Slayers	UK Rapi Boy		6	8	5	-	19	Safe	-	-

==== Week 5 (Episode 9–10) ====
Last week's squad of the week, EPR had to choose one of the two random envelops (Power to eliminate & Power to save). He got Power to save and chose GD 47.

Key	"Radio Hit" from Bashah	Best Performer	Power to save	Power to eliminate	Immune	Safe	Danger Zone	Bottom 2	Eliminated

Order	Squad	Rapper	Judge	Squad Bosses				Total Score	Judges' Decision	Public Voting	Battle Result
Order	Squad	Rapper	Badshah	Dee MC	Dino James	EPR	King	Total Score	Judges' Decision	Public Voting	Battle Result
1	Dino Warriors	Srushti		10	-	9	10	29	Immune	-	-
2	EPR Rebels	MC Square		10	9	-	10	29	Immune	-	-
3	Dino Warriors	Wicked Sunny		10	-	9	10	29	Immune	-	-
4	EPR Rebels	Panther		10	10	-	8	28	Immune	-	-
5	King Slayers	Paradox		9	9	9	-	27	Safe	-	-
6	Dee MC Dynamites	Spectra		-	9	9	10	28	Immune	-	-
7	Dee MC Dynamites	GD 47		-	7	7	8	22	Danger Zone	Bottom 3	
8	EPR Rebels	Nazz		10	10	-	10	30		-	-
9	Dino Warriors	Gravity		9	-	10	8	27	Safe	-	-
10	Dee MC Dynamites	Super Manikk		-	7	7	9	23	Immune	-	-
11	EPR Rebels	MC Headshot		10	8	-	9	27	Safe	-	-
12	Dino Warriors	Lxsh		7	-	6	5	18	Danger Zone	Bottom 3	Eliminated
13	King Slayers	UK Rapi Boy		9	7	8	-	24	Safe	-	-
14	Dee MC Dynamites	QK		-	6	8	7	21	Danger Zone	Safe	-
15	King Slayers	Rhyme		8	8	7	-	23	Danger Zone	Bottom 3	Eliminated

==== Week 6 (Episode 11–12) ====
Theme: Lyrical

Last week's squad of the week, EPR had a special power "Judge 2.0", to judge the elimination battles. But he decided not to eliminate anyone.

Key	"Radio Hit" from Bashah	Best Performer	Power to save	Power to eliminate	Immune	Safe	Danger Zone	Bottom 2	Eliminated

Order	Squad	Rapper	Judge	Squad Bosses				Total Score	Judges' Decision	Battle Result
Order	Squad	Rapper	Badshah	Dee MC	Dino James	EPR	King	Total Score	Judges' Decision	Battle Result
1	King Slayers	UK Rapi Boy		10	10	9	-	29	Immune	-
2	Dino Warriors	Srushti		10	-	10	10	30	Safe	-
3	Dino Warriors	Gravity		10	-	10	10	30		-
4	EPR Rebels	Nazz		10	10	-	10	30	Immune	-
5	Dee MC Dynamites	GD 47		-	10	10	10	30	Immune	-
6	EPR Rebels	Panther		10	9	-	10	29	Safe	-
7	Dee MC Dynamites	Super Manikk		-	7	7	7	21	Danger Zone	
8	Dino Warriors	Wicked Sunny		10	-	8	10	28	Immune	-
9	EPR Rebels	MC Square		10	10	-	10	30	Immune	-
10	EPR Rebels	MC Headshot		9	7	-	9	25	Safe	-
11	Dee MC Dynamites	Spectra		-	8	7	8	23	Danger Zone	
12	King Slayers	Paradox		8	7	8	-	23	Danger Zone	
13	Dee MC Dynamites	QK		-	6	6	8	20	Danger Zone	

==== Week 7 (Episode 13–14) ====
Theme: Shout-out

Last week's squad of the week, Dino James had a special power "Score + 2.0", where he could add 2 points to any rapper. He choose GD 47 to add 2 points.

Key	"Radio Hit" from Bashah	Best Performer	Immune	Safe	Danger Zone	Bottom 2	Eliminated

Order	Squad	Rapper	Judge	Squad Bosses				Total Score	Judges' Decision	Public Voting	Battle Result
Order	Squad	Rapper	Badshah	Dee MC	Dino James	EPR	King	Total Score	Judges' Decision	Public Voting	Battle Result
1	King Slayers	Paradox		9	10	10	-	29	Immune	-	-
2	Dino Warriors	Wicked Sunny		8	-	7	8	23	Safe	-	-
3	EPR Rebels	MC Square		10	10	-	10	30	Immune	-	-
4	Dino Warriors	Srushti		10	-	10	10	30	Immune	-	-
5	Dee MC Dynamites	GD 47		-	8	6	6	20+2=22	Danger Zone	Bottom 2	+ Eliminated
6	EPR Rebels	Panther		9	8	-	8	25	Safe	-	-
7	EPR Rebels	Nazz		7	8	-	6	21	Danger Zone	Bottom 2	+ Safe
8	King Slayers	UK Rapi Boy		7	7	7	-	21	Danger Zone	Safe	-
9	Dee MC Dynamites	Super Manikk		-	8	7	8	23	Safe	-	-
10	Dee MC Dynamites	QK		-	7	8	9	24	Immune	-	-
11	Dee MC Dynamites	Spectra		-	8	8	8	24	Immune	-	-
12	Dino Warriors	Gravity		10	-	10	10	30		-	-
13	EPR Rebels	MC Headshot		8	7	-	9	24	Safe	-	-

==== Week 8 (Episode 15-16) ====
Key	"Radio Hit" from Bashah	Best Performer	Power to save	Power to eliminate	Immune	Safe	Danger Zone	Bottom 2	Eliminated

Theme #1: Collaboration - Squad Bosses' paired-up the rappers.

Theme #2: Badshah's Industry Ready Challenges:

- Dee MC Dynamites: Ad Jingle to Hip Hop (Classic range)
- Dino Warriors: Use Key Words in Rap (Muscle, Freak, Fitness, Weightlifting)
- EPR Rebels: Brand Anthem Rendition (Yamaha - the call of the blue)
- King Slayers: Bollywood to Hip Hop (Tujhko jo paya)

Last week's squad of the week, Dino James had a special power "Danger Zone 2.0", where he could another Collab pair in Danger Zone. He choose Spectra and Panther.

Order	Squad	Rapper	Judge	Squad Bosses				Total Score	Judges' Decision	Public Voting	Battle Result
Order	Squad	Rapper	Badshah	Dee MC	Dino James	EPR	King	Total Score	Judges' Decision	Public Voting	Battle Result
1	Dee MC Dynamites	Super Manikk		10	9	9	10	38	Immune	-	-
1	Dino Warriors	Wicked Sunny		10	9	9	10	38	Immune	-	-
2	EPR Rebels	Nazz		10	10	10	10	40		-	-
2	Dino Warriors	Srushti		10	10	10	10	40		-	-
3	Dino Warriors	Gravity		9	8	8	9	34	Danger Zone	Safe	-
3	EPR Rebels	MC Headshot		9	8	8	9	34	Danger Zone	Bottom 3	+ Eliminated
4	King Slayers	Paradox		10	10	10	10	40	Immune	-	-
4	EPR Rebels	MC Square		10	10	10	10	40	Immune	-	-
5	EPR Rebels	Panther		9	8	10	8	35		Bottom 3	+ Eliminated
5	Dee MC Dynamites	Spectra		9	8	10	8	35		Bottom 3	+ Safe
6	King Slayers	UK Rapi Boy		10	10	9	10	39	Safe	-	-
6	Dee MC Dynamites	QK		10	10	9	10	39	Safe	-	-

==== Week 9 Semi Final (Episode 17-18) ====
Key	"Radio Hit" from Badshah	Best Performer	Top 5	Eliminated

Theme: Battleground 2.0

Top 10 contestants competed in one-on-one Battles to earn the Ticket to Finale. Only five contestants advanced to the Finale.

Battle No.	Order	Squad	Rapper	Battle Result
1	1	Dino Warriors	Wicked Sunny	Eliminated
1	2	EPR Rebels	Nazz	Top 5
2	1	Dee MC Dynamites	Super Manikk	Eliminated
2	2	Dee MC Dynamites	Spectra	Top 5
3	1	Dino Warriors	Gravity	Top 5
3	2	King Slayers	Paradox	Top 5
4	1	Dee MC Dynamites	QK	Eliminated
4	2	King Slayers	UK Rapi Boy	Eliminated
5	1	Dino Warriors	Srushti	Eliminated
5	2	EPR Rebels	MC Square	Top 5 +

Top 5 finalists performed for the public and the public voting were open for final time, with the votes deciding the winner next week.

Order	Squad	Rapper	Judge
Order	Squad	Rapper	Badshah
1	EPR Rebels	MC Square	
2	Dino Warriors	Gravity	
3	EPR Rebels	Nazz	
4	Dee MC Dynamites	Spectra	
5	King Slayers	Paradox	

==== Week 10 Final (Episode 19-20) ====
Order	Squad	Rapper	Result
1	King Slayers	Paradox	Top 3
2	EPR Rebels	Nazz	Top 3
3	Dee MC Dynamites	Spectra	Eliminated
4	Dino Warriors	Gravity	Eliminated
5	EPR Rebels	MC Square	Top 3

After Top 5 finalists performed, based on Public Votes three moved-on to Top 3.

Squad	Rapper	Final Result
EPR Rebels	MC Square	Winner
King Slayers	Paradox	Runner-up
EPR Rebels	Nazz	3rd Place

=== Guests ===
Week	Episode(s)	Guest Judge	Episode	Guest Appearance
3	5-6	Ikka	none	
4	7-8	Brodha V	none	
5	none		10	J Trix
7	13-14	Encore ABJ & Calm (Seedhe Maut)	none	
8	15-16	Fotty Seven & Bali	16	Bombay Local
10	19-20	Ikka	none	

== Season 3 ==
=== Judges and host ===
Badshah and squad bosses EPR, Dino James and Dee MC returned to judge. Ikka Singh joined season 3 as the new squad boss. Super Manikk and Wicked Sunny were the hosts for this season. On 24 December 2023, Uday was declared as the winner.

=== Contestants ===
Contestant	Stage Name	Finish	Place
Uday Pandhi	Uday	Episode 20	Winner
Shlok Verma	Bassick	Episode 20	Runner-up
Saurabh Abhyankar	100 RBH	Episode 20	3rd Place
Mrunal Shankar Dhole	Mrunal Shankar	Episode 20	4–6
Vijay Kumar	Vijay Dada	Episode 20	4–6
Kayden Sharma	Kayden Sharma	Episode 20	4–6
Jasdeep Singh	Burrah	Episode 18	7-10
Gauresh Kale	Gaush	Episode 18	7-10
Mayank Rawat	Rap ID	Episode 18	7-10
Shayaan Bhat	Shen B	Episode 18	7-10
Bobby Randhawa	Bob B. Randhawa	Episode 16	11
Shaheer Faisal	Poet Shaf	Episode 14	12-13
Vishal	Vish	Episode 14	12-13
Prince Singh	Prince The Artist Singh	Episode 12	14
Swagat Yein	Shady Mellow	Episode 10	15
Sahil Badal	Badal	Episode 8	16
Jaya Rohillaa	Jaya	Episode 4	17-20
N/A	Lekhak	Episode 4	17-20
Meet Dubey	Meetoride	Episode 4	17-20
Mandeep Singh	MNDP	Episode 4	17-20

Male
Female

=== Squads ===
Dee MC Dynamites	Dino Warriors	EPR Rebels	Ikka Gangstars
Uday	Vijay Dada	Mrunal Shankar	Badal
100 RBH	Poet Shaf	Gaush	Kayden Sharma
Shen B	Bassick	Shady Mellow	Bob B Randhawa
Prince	Burrah	Vish	Rap ID

==== Squad and Performer of the week ====
Week	Squad of the Week	Performer(s) of the Week	
Week 3	EPR Rebels	Mrunal Shankar	
Week 4	Dee MC Dynamites	Uday	
Week 5	Dee MC Dynamites	Shen B	
Week 6	Dino Warriors	Burrah	
Week 7	Dino Warriors	Vijay Dada	
Week 8	Ikka Gangsters & Dino Warriors	Kayden Sharma	Vijay Dada
Week 9	Dee MC Dynamites	100 RBH	

=== Summary ===
Squad	Contestant	Week 1–2	Week 3	Week 4	Week 5	Week 6	Week 7	Week 8	Week 9	Week 10	Total	Final ranking
Dee MC Dynamites	Uday	SAFE	9	9	7	9	7	12	SAFE	Winner	53	1
Dino Warriors	Bassick	SAFE	5	8	5	9	7	12	SAFE	Runner-up	43	2
Dee MC Dynamites	100 RBH	SAFE	9	9	5	9	9	5	SAFE	3rd Place	46	3
EPR Rebels	Mrunal Shankar	SAFE	9	9	4	8	5	Finalist		TOP 6	35	5
Dino Warriors	Vijay Dada	SAFE	7	9	9	9	9	12	Finalist	TOP 6	55	4
Ikka Gangstars	Kayden Sharma	SAFE	8	9	7	5	5	12	SAFE	TOP 6	46	6
EPR Rebels	Gaush	SAFE	9	8	7	7	9	12	ELIM	Guest	52	7
Dee MC Dynamites	Shen B	BTM6	7	9	9	6	9	12	ELIM	Guest	52	8
Dino Warriors	Burrah	SAFE	8	8	9	7	9	10	ELIM	Guest	51	9
Ikka Gangstars	Rap ID	SAFE	8	9	6	7	8	10	ELIM	Guest	48	10
Ikka Gangstars	Bob B	SAFE	7	9	9	9	6	5		Guest	45	11
Dino Warriors	Poet Shaf	SAFE	6	8	9	3	5			Guest	31	12-13
EPR Rebels	Vish	SAFE	8	6	4	7	6			Guest	31	12-13
Dee MC Dynamites	Prince	BTM6	7	9	5	5				Guest	26	14
EPR Rebels	Shady Mellow	SAFE	9	6	3					Guest	18	15
Ikka Gangstars	Badal	SAFE	9	6						Guest	15	16
-	Jaya	ELIM									0	17-20
-	Lekhak	ELIM									0	17-20
-	Meetoride	ELIM									0	17-20
-	MNDP	ELIM									0	17-20

==== Notes ====
"Bold Numbers" represent "Radio Hits" received from Badshah
Best Performer of the week
Received positive critics and was declared safe
Safe
Received negative critics and was in Danger Zone but was declared safe
Bottom
Winner
Finalist
Runner-up
Eliminated
Guest

=== Weekly summary ===
==== Week 1-2 (Episode 1–4) ====
For week 1 & 2, after each contestant performed Badshah decides which squad to be assigned to. But, the Squad Bosses can mic drop and ask the contestant to join their squad.

Key	Mic drop from squad boss	Radio Ready Performer	Bottom 6	Advanced to Top 16

Order	Rapper	Judge	Squad Bosses				Squad chosen by		Result
Order	Rapper	Badshah	Dee MC	Dino James	EPR	Ikka	Badshah	Contestant	Result
1	Badal						-	Ikka Gangstars	Top 16
2	Kayden						-	Ikka Gangstars	Top 16
3	Mrunal Shankar						-	EPR Rebels	Top 16
4	Vijay Dada						Dino Warriors	-	Top 16
5	Gaush						-	EPR Rebels	Top 16
6	Poet Shaf						Dino Warriors	-	Top 16
7	Bob B						-	Ikka Gangstars	Top 16
8	Meetoride								Bottom 6
9	Rap ID						-	Ikka Gangstars	Top 16
10	Jaya								Bottom 6
11	Shady Mellow						EPR Rebels	-	Top 16
12	Prince The Artist Singh								Bottom 6
13	Uday						Dee MC Dynamites	-	Top 16
14	100 RBH						Dee MC Dynamites	-	Top 16
15	Vish						EPR Rebels	-	Top 16
16	Bassick						Dino Warriors	-	Top 16
17	Shen B								Bottom 6
18	Burrah						-	Dino Warriors	Top 16
19	Lekhak								Bottom 6
20	MNDP								Bottom 6

===== Battleground: Ground Shunya =====
The bottom 6 contestant compete three-way battle in the Battleground. Only two moved-on to the next round.

After 2 battles, Badshah had to choose two contestant to join Dee MC Dynamites squad.

Battle No.	Rapper					Survived	Eliminated	
1	Jaya	vs.	Shen B	vs.	MNDP	Shen B	Jaya	MNDP
2	Meetoride	vs.	Lekhak	vs.	Prince	Prince	Lekhak	Meetoride

==== Week 3 (Episode 5–6): Showcase Week ====
From this week, the squad bosses scored out of 3 after each performance.

Also the public voting were open, with the votes effecting the next week's elimination.

Key	"Radio Hit" from Bashah	Best Performer of the Week	Safe

Order	Squad	Rapper	Judge	Squad Bosses				Total Score	Judges' Decision
Order	Squad	Rapper	Badshah	Dee MC	Dino James	EPR	Ikka	Total Score	Judges' Decision
1	Dee MC Dynamites	100 RBH		-	3	3	3	9	Safe
2	EPR Rebels	Mrunal Shankar		3	3	-	3	9	
3	EPR Rebels	Gaush		3	3	-	3	9	Safe
4	Ikka Gangstars	Kayden Sharma		3	3	2	-	8	Safe
5	Ikka Gangstars	Rap ID		3	2	3	-	8	Safe
6	Dee MC Dynamites	Prince		-	2	2	3	7	Safe
7	Ikka Gangstars	Badal		3	3	3	-	9	Safe
8	Dino Warriors	Vijay Dada		2	-	2	3	7	Safe
9	Dee MC Dynamites	Uday		-	3	3	3	9	Safe
10	EPR Rebels	Shady Mellow		3	3	-	3	9	Safe
11	Ikka Gangstars	Bob B		2	3	2	-	7	Safe
12	Dee MC Dynamites	Shen B		-	2	2	3	7	Safe
13	Dino Warriors	Burrah		2	-	3	3	8	Safe
14	Dino Warriors	Poet Shaf		2	-	2	2	6	Safe
15	EPR Rebels	Vish		2	3	-	3	8	Safe
16	Dino Warriors	Bassick		2	-	1	2	5	Safe

==== Week 4 (Episode 7–8): BYOB Week - Bring Your Own Bars, Bring Your Own Beats, Bring Your Own Bangers ====
This week's squad of the week, Dee MC had to choose to save one of the four Rappers in Danger Zone. She chose Shen B.

Key	"Radio Hit" from Bashah	Best Performer of the Week	Immune	Safe	Originally in Danger Zone, but was saved from Squad Boss of the week	Danger Zone	Bottom 2	Eliminated

Order	Squad	Rapper	Judge	Squad Bosses				Total Score	Judges' Decision	Public Voting	Battle Result
Order	Squad	Rapper	Badshah	Dee MC	Dino James	EPR	Ikka	Total Score	Judges' Decision	Public Voting	Battle Result
1	Dee MC Dynamites	Prince		-	3	3	3	9	Immune	-	-
2	Ikka Gangstars	Kayden Sharma		3	3	3	-	9	Immune	-	-
3	Dino Warriors	Bassick		2	-	3	3	8	Safe	-	-
4	Dino Warriors	Vijay Dada		3	-	3	3	9	Immune	-	-
5	Ikka Gangstars	Bob B		3	3	3	-	9	Immune	-	-
6	Dee MC Dynamites	Shen B		-	3	3	3	9	Saved	-	-
7	EPR Rebels	Vish		2	2	-	2	6	Safe	-	-
8	Ikka Gangstars	Badal		2	2	2	-	6	Danger Zone	Bottom 2	Eliminated
9	EPR Rebels	Gaush		2	3	-	3	8	Safe	-	-
10	Dee MC Dynamites	100 RBH		-	3	3	3	9	Immune	-	-
11	Dee MC Dynamites	Uday		-	3	3	3	9		-	-
12	EPR Rebels	Mrunal Shankar		3	3	-	3	9	Safe	-	-
13	Ikka Gangstars	Rap ID		3	3	3	-	9	Immune	-	-
14	Dino Warriors	Poet Shaf		3	-	3	2	8	Danger Zone	Bottom 2	Safe
15	Dino Warriors	Burrah		2	-	3	3	8	Safe	-	-
16	EPR Rebels	Shady Mellow		2	2	-	2	6	Danger Zone	Safe	-

==== Week 5 (Episode 9–10): Zone Flip ====
This week's squad of the week, Dee MC had to choose to save one of the four Rappers in Danger Zone. She chose 100 RBH.

Key	"Radio Hit" from Bashah	Best Performer of the Week	Immune	Safe	Originally in Danger Zone, but was saved from Squad Boss of the week	Danger Zone	Bottom 2	Eliminated

Order	Squad	Rapper	Judge	Squad Bosses				Total Score	Judges' Decision	Public Voting	Battle Result
Order	Squad	Rapper	Badshah	Dee MC	Dino James	EPR	Ikka	Total Score	Judges' Decision	Public Voting	Battle Result
1	Ikka Gangstars	Rap ID		2	2	2	-	6	Immune	-	-
2	Dino Warriors	Burrah		3	-	3	3	9	Immune	-	-
3	Ikka Gangstars	Kayden Sharma		3	2	2	-	7	Danger Zone	Safe	-
4	Dee MC Dynamites	Shen B		-	3	3	3	9		-	-
5	Dino Warriors	Bassick		2	-	2	1	5	Danger Zone	Bottom 2	Safe
6	EPR Rebels	Gaush		3	2	-	2	7	Safe	-	-
7	EPR Rebels	Vish		1	2	-	1	4	Safe	-	-
8	Dee MC Dynamites	Prince		-	1	2	2	5	Safe	-	-
9	Dino Warriors	Vijay Dada		3	-	3	3	9	Safe	-	-
10	Dee MC Dynamites	Uday		-	2	2	3	7	Immune	-	-
11	Ikka Gangstars	Bob B		3	3	3	-	9	Safe	-	-
12	Dee MC Dynamites	100 RBH		-	2	1	2	5	Saved	-	-
13	Dino Warriors	Poet Shaf		3	-	3	3	9	Safe	-	-
14	EPR Rebels	Shady Mellow		1	1	-	1	3	Danger Zone	Bottom 2	Eliminated
15	EPR Rebels	Mrunal Shankar		1	1	-	2	4	Safe	-	-

==== Week 6 (Episode 11–12): Level Up ====
This week's squad of the week, Dino had to choose to save one of the three Rappers in Danger Zone. He chose Poet Shaf.

Key	"Radio Hit" from Bashah	Best Performer of the Week	Immune	Safe	Originally in Danger Zone, but was saved from Squad Boss of the week	Danger Zone	Bottom 2	Eliminated

Order	Squad	Rapper	Judge	Squad Bosses				Total Score	Judges' Decision	Public Voting	Battle Result
Order	Squad	Rapper	Badshah	Dee MC	Dino James	EPR	Ikka	Total Score	Judges' Decision	Public Voting	Battle Result
1	Dino Warriors	Bassick		3	-	3	3	9	Immune	-	-
2	Dee MC Dynamites	Uday		-	3	3	3	9	Immune	-	-
3	Ikka Gangstars	Bob B		3	3	3	-	9	Immune	-	-
4	EPR Rebels	Mrunal Shankar		3	2	-	3	8	Safe	-	-
5	Ikka Gangstars	Kayden Sharma		2	2	1	-	5	Danger Zone	Safe	-
6	Dee MC Dynamites	Shen B		-	2	2	2	6	Danger Zone	Bottom 2	Safe
7	Dino Warriors	Poet Shaf		1	-	1	1	3	Saved	-	-
8	Dee MC Dynamites	100 RBH		-	3	3	3	9	Immune	-	-
9	Dino Warriors	Burrah		2	-	2	3	7		-	-
10	EPR Rebels	Gaush		2	3	-	2	7	Safe	-	-
11	Dino Warriors	Vijay Dada		3	-	3	3	9	Immune	-	-
12	EPR Rebels	Vish		2	2	-	3	7	Safe	-	-
13	Dee MC Dynamites	Prince		-	2	1	2	5	Danger Zone	Bottom 2	Eliminated
14	Ikka Gangstars	Rap ID		2	2	3	-	7	Safe	-	-

==== Week 7 (Episode 13–14): Go Bass the Boss ====
Mrunal Shankar won the ticket to Finale. This week's squad of the week, Ikka Gangstar had to choose to save one of the five Rappers in Danger Zone. He chose Kayden.

Key	"Radio Hit" from Bashah	Best Performer of the Week	Immune	Safe	Originally in Danger Zone, but was saved from Squad Boss of the week	Danger Zone	Bottom 2	Eliminated

Order	Squad	Rapper	Judge	Squad Bosses				Total Score	Judges' Decision	Public Voting	Battle Result
Order	Squad	Rapper	Badshah	Dee MC	Dino James	EPR	Ikka	Total Score	Judges' Decision	Public Voting	Battle Result
1	Dino Warriors	Vijay Dada		3	-	3	3	9		-	-
2	EPR Rebels	Gaush		3	3	-	3	9	Safe	-	-
3	EPR Rebels	Mrunal Shankar		2	1	-	2	5	Immune	-	-
4	Dino Warriors	Bassick		2	-	2	3	7	Danger Zone	Safe	-
5	Dee MC Dynamites	100 RBH		-	3	3	3	9	Safe	-	-
6	Dino Warriors	Burrah		3	-	3	3	9	Safe	-	-
7	Dee MC Dynamites	Uday		-	3	1	3	7	Danger Zone	Bottom 3	Safe
8	EPR Rebels	Vish		2	2	-	2	6	Danger Zone	Bottom 3	Eliminated
9	Ikka Gangstars	Rap ID		3	3	2	-	8	Immune	-	-
10	Dee MC Dynamites	Shen B		-	3	3	3	9	Safe	-	-
11	Ikka Gangstars	Bob B		2	3	1	-	6	Immune	-	-
12	Dino Warriors	Poet Shaf		2	-	1	2	5	Danger Zone	Bottom 3	Eliminated
13	Ikka Gangstars	Kayden Sharma		2	2	1	-	5	Saved	-	-

==== Week 8 (Episode 15–16): Collab Week ====
This week contestants collaborated and performed in pairs. As Mrunal Shankar won the Ticket to Finale, she collabed with her Squad Boss EPR.

Also each squad performed a group Ad Jingle for the sponsors of the show.

- EPR Rebels: POCO
- Dee MC Dynamites: Appy Fizz
- Ikka Gangsters: Big muscle nutrition
- Dino Warriors: MTV

Vijay Dada won the ticket to Finale. This week's squad of the week was Dee MC Dynamites. This week there was only Bottom 2, no-one was saved by squad boss power or public vote.

Key	"Radio Hit" from Bashah	Best Performer of the Week	Ticket to Finale	Immune	Bottom 2	Eliminated

Order	Squad	Rapper	Judge	Squad Bosses				Total Score	Judges' Decision	Battle Result
Order	Squad	Rapper	Badshah	Dee MC	Dino James	EPR	Ikka	Total Score	Judges' Decision	Battle Result
1	Ikka Gangstars	Kayden Sharma		3	3	3	3	12		-
1	Dino Warriors	Vijay Dada		3	3	3	3	12		-
2	Dino Warriors	Bassick		3	3	3	3	12	Immune	-
2	Dee MC Dynamites	Uday		3	3	3	3	12	Immune	-
3	EPR Rebels	Mrunal Shankar	Finalist							
4	Dino Warriors	Burrah		2	3	3	2	10	Immune	-
4	Ikka Gangstars	Rap ID		2	3	3	2	10	Immune	-
5	Dee MC Dynamites	100 RBH		1	2	1	1	5	Bottom 2	Safe
5	Ikka Gangstars	Bob B		1	2	1	1	5	Bottom 2	Eliminated
6	EPR Rebels	Gaush		3	3	3	3	12	Immune	-
6	Dee MC Dynamites	Shen B		3	3	3	3	12	Immune	-

==== Week 9 (Episode 17-18): Semi Final - Mega Ground Shunya ====
Key	Best Performer	Advanced to Top 6	Eliminated

Eight contestants from Top 10 competed in one-on-one Battles to move on to the Finale. Only four contestants advanced to the Finale. Mrunal Shankar and Vijay Dada did not compete as they had ticket to Finale

Battle No.	Order	Squad	Rapper	Battle Result
1	1	Dee MC Dynamites	Shen B	Eliminated
1	2	Dino Warriors	Bassick	Advanced to Top 6
2	1	Dee MC Dynamites	100 RBH	Advanced to Top 6
2	2	Ikka Gangstars	Rap ID	Eliminated
3	1	Ikka Gangstars	Kayden Sharma	Advanced to Top 6
3	2	Dino Warriors	Burrah	Eliminated
4	1	EPR Rebels	Gaush	Eliminated
4	2	Dee MC Dynamites	Uday	Advanced to Top 6

Top 6 finalists performed for the public and the public voting were open for final time, with the votes deciding the winner next week.

Order	Squad	Rapper	Judge
Order	Squad	Rapper	Badshah
1	Dino Warriors	Bassick	
2	Dee MC Dynamites	Uday	
3	Ikka Gangstars	Kayden Sharma	
4	Dee MC Dynamites	100 RBH	
5	EPR Rebels	Mrunal Shankar	
6	Dino Warriors	Vijay Dada	

==== Week 10 (Episode 19–20): Grand Finale ====
The winner wins ₹10,00,000 cash prize, POCO Made of Mad gifts worth ₹2.5 lakhs and GOVO soundbar.

Rapper 100 RBH won the OG Hustler Award and received a cash prize of ₹5,00,000.

Order	Squad	Rapper	Result
1	Dee Mc Dynamites	Uday	Top 3
2	Dino Warriors	Bassick	Top 3
3	Dee MC Dynamites	100 RBH	Top 3
4	Dino Warriors	Vijay Dada	Eliminated
5	EPR Rebels	Mrunal Shankar	Eliminated
6	Ikka Gangsters	Kayden Sharma	Eliminated

After Top 6 finalists performed, based on judges' choice three moved-on to Top 3. And the winner was crowned based on public votes.

Order	Squad	Rapper	Final Result
1	Dee Mc Dynamites	Uday	Winner
2	Dino Warriors	Bassick	Runner up
3	DeeMc Dynamites	100 RBH	Third Place

=== Guests ===
Week	Episode(s)	Guest Judge(s)	Episode	Guest Appearance
2	none		3	MC Square (Season 2 - Winner)
3	5-6	Sikander Kahlon & RAGA	none	
5	9-10	Salim Merchant	none	
6	11-12	Encore ABJ & Calm (Seedhe Maut)	none	
7	none		13	Riar Saab & Abhijay Sharma
8	15-16	Samantha Ruth Prabhu	15	Gravity (Season 2 - Finalist)
8	15-16	Samantha Ruth Prabhu	16	GD47 (Season 2 - Contestant)
9	none		18	Paradox (Season 2 - Runner Up)
10	19-20	Guru Randhawa	20	Uchana Amit
10	19-20	King (Season 1 - Contestant & Season 2 - Squad Boss)	20	Vishal Mishra

== Season 4 ==
This season, also known as MTV Hustle 4: ‘HIP HOP, DON’T STOP’, premiered on 19 October 2024.

=== Judges and host ===
Raftaar returned as the judge after his absence from two seasons, accompanied by Ikka Singh on the panel. EPR, Dino James and Dee MC returned to judge and were joined by Raga as the newest addition to squad bosses. Jizzy and Talha Siddiqui hosted the season. Lashcurry was declared as the winner.

=== Contestants ===
Contestant	Stage Name	Finish	Place
Vinayak Lashkari	LashCurry	Episode 20	Winner
Sujal Dupare	Naam Sujal	Episode 20	Runner-up
Madhusudhan Sharma	Dharmik	Episode 20	3rd Place
Yash Dandge	99side	Episode 20	4-6
Abhin Pandita	Vichaar	Episode 20	4-6
Aniket Bhatt	Siyaahi	Episode 20	4-6
Sujal Shah	Mad Trip	Episode 18	7-10
Aakash Gopal	Sense	Episode 18	7-10
Akriti Lal	PHO	Episode 18	7-10
Ishmeet Atwal	Ghaint Jxtt	Episode 18	7-10
Aditya Singh	Little Bhatia	Episode 16	11-12
Ajitesh Bhati	Ajitesh Bhati	Episode 16	11-12
Danish Ahmad	Danish	Episode 12	13-14
Armaan Yadav	K!LLSWITCH	Episode 12	13-14
Ayush Rajoria	Rajjo	Episode 10	15
Abhay Prasad	Devil The Rhymer	Episode 8	16
Dev Pratap Singh	DOTM	Episode 4	17-19
Manpreet Singh	Manisten	Episode 4	17-19
Tarun	Volt	Episode 4	17-19

Male
Female

=== Squads ===
Dee MC Dynamites	Dino Warriors	EPR Rebels	Raga Ragers
Dharmik	99side	Ghaint Jxtt	Mad Trip
Rajjo	Ajitesh Bhati	Naam Sujal	Lashcurry
PHO	Danish	K!LLSWITCH	Devil the rhymer
Sense	Little Bhatia	Vichaar	Siyaahi

==== Squad and Performer of the week ====
Week	Squad of the Week	Performer(s) of the Week
Week 3	Dino Warriors	99side
Week 4	DeeMC Dynamites	Dharmik
Week 5	Raga Ragers	Lashcurry
Week 6	EPR Rebels	Naam Sujal
Week 7	Raga Ragers	Mad Trip
Week 8	DeeMC Dynamites	Dharmik Sense
Week 9	Raga Ragers	Lashcurry

=== Summary ===
Squad	Contestant	Week 1–2	Week 3	Week 4	Week 5	Week 6	Week 7	Week 8	Week 9	Week 10	Total
Raga Ragers	Lashcurry	SAFE	29	30	30	29	25	31	BEST & Finalist	Winner	174
EPR Rebels	Naam Sujal	SAFE	30	30	30	30	30	31	Finalist	Runner-Up	181
Dee MC Dynamites	Dharmik	SAFE	26	30	30	26	29	40	Finalist	3rd Place	181
Dino Warriors	99side	SAFE	30	29	30	30	30	Finalist		4th	149
EPR Rebels	Vichaar	BTM6	23	30	28	24	30	31	Finalist	5th	166
Raga Ragers	Siyaahi	SAFE	26	29	28	25	29	31	Finalist	6th	168
Dee MC Dynamites	Sense	BTM6	19	23	28	30	28	40	ELIM	Guest	168
EPR Rebels	Ghaint Jxtt	SAFE	29	30	22	22	28	27	ELIM	Guest	158
Dee MC Dynamites	PHO	SAFE	26	30	23	15	27	31	ELIM	Guest	152
Raga Ragers	Mad Trip	SAFE	25	15	14	30	30	28	ELIM	Guest	142
Dino Warriors	Little Bhatia	SAFE	29	26	21	26	29	28		Guest	159
Dino Warriors	Ajitesh Bhati	SAFE	18	28	23	29	29	27		Guest	154
EPR Rebels	K!LLSWITCH	SAFE	20	24	26	22				Guest	92
Dino Warriors	Danish	SAFE	15	27	21	21				Guest	84
Dee MC Dynamites	Rajjo	SAFE	22	19	19					Guest	60
Raga Ragers	Devil The Rhymer	BTM6	18	22						Guest	40
-	DOTM	ELIM									0
-	Manisten	ELIM									0
-	Volt	ELIM									0

==== Notes ====
"Bold Numbers" represent "Radio Hits" received from judges
Best Performer of the week + Finalist
Best Performer of the week
Received positive critics (Radio Hit) and was declared safe
Safe
Received negative critics and was in Danger Zone but was declared safe
Bottom
Eliminated
Finalist
Runner-up
Winner
Guest

=== Weekly summary ===
==== Week 1-2 (Episode 1–4) ====
For week 1 & 2, during each contestant's performance squad bosses had 90 seconds to add them to their playlist, each contestant required at least three squad bosses vote to be assign to a squad. But the contestants who gets Radio Ready from either Raftaar or Ikka, they decide which squad to be assigned to.

Key	Add to playlist from squad boss	Radio Ready Performer	Bottom 6	Advanced

Order	Rapper	Judges		Squad Bosses				Result	Squad
Order	Rapper	Raftaar	Ikka	Dee MC	Dino James	EPR	Raga	Result	Squad
1	Dharmik							Advanced	Dee MC Dynamites
2	99Side							Advanced	Dino Warriors
3	Rajjo							Advanced	Dee MC Dynamites
4	Ghaint Jxtt							Advanced	EPR Rebels
5	Lashcurry							Advanced	Raga Ragers
6	Vichaar							Huddle Room	-
7	Naam Sujal							Advanced	EPR Rebels
8	Ajitesh Bhati							Advanced	Dino Warriors
9	PHO							Advanced	Dee MC Dynamites
10	Sense							Huddle Room	-
11	Mad Trip							Advanced	Raga Ragers
12	DOTM							Huddle Room	-
13	Danish							Advanced	Dino Warriors
14	Siyaahi							Advanced	Raga Ragers
15	Devil The Rhymer							Huddle Room	-
16	K!LLSWITCH							Advanced	EPR Rebels
17	Manisten							Huddle Room	-
18	Volt							Huddle Room	-
19	Little Bhatia							Advanced	Dino Warriors

===== BattleVerse: Huddle Room =====
Six contestants from Huddle Room battled it out in the Battleground, with only three making it to the next round.

Battle No.	Battles			Survived	Squad	Eliminated
1	Sense	vs	Volt	Sense	Dee MC Dynamites	Volt
2	Devil the Rhymer	vs	Manisten	Devil the Rhymer	Raga Ragers	Manisten
3	DOTM	vs	Vichaar	Vichaar	EPR Rebels	DOTM

==== Week 3 (Episode 5–6): Hustle Pro Max ====
From this week, the squad bosses scored out of 10 after each performance. Also the public voting were open, with the votes effecting the next week's elimination. No elimination this week.

Key	"Radio Hit" from judges	Best Performer of the Week	Immune	Safe	Danger Zone

Order	Squad	Rapper	Judges		Squad Bosses				Total Score	Judges' Decision
Order	Squad	Rapper	Raftaar	Ikka	Dee MC	Dino James	EPR	Raga	Total Score	Judges' Decision
1	Raga Ragers	Lashcurry			9	10	10	-	29	Immune
2	EPR Rebels	Ghaint Jxtt			9	10	-	10	29	Immune
3	Dee MC Dynamites	PHO			-	9	7	10	26	Safe
4	Dino Warriors	99side			10	-	10	10	30	
5	EPR Rebels	Vichaar			7	9	-	7	23	Safe
6	Dee MC Dynamites	Sense			-	6	4	9	19	Danger Zone
7	Dino Warriors	Little Bhatia			9	-	10	10	29	Immune
8	Raga Ragers	Devil The Rhymer			6	6	6	-	18	Danger Zone
9	EPR Rebels	Naam Sujal			10	10	-	10	30	Immune
10	Raga Ragers	Mad Trip			8	10	7	-	25	Immune
11	Raga Ragers	Siyaahi			9	9	8	-	26	Safe
12	Dee MC Dynamites	Dharmik			-	8	10	8	26	Immune
13	EPR Rebels	K!LLSWITCH			7	7	-	6	20	Danger Zone
14	Dino Warriors	Ajitesh Bhati			5	-	6	7	18	Immune
15	Dee MC Dynamites	Rajjo			-	8	6	8	22	Safe
16	Dino Warriors	Danish			5	-	4	6	15	Danger Zone

==== Week 4 (Episode 7–8): Flex Week ====
From this week, based on public votes and squad bosses scores elimination begins. This week's squad of the week, EPR had to choose to save one of the three Rappers in Danger Zone. He chose Rajjo.

Key	"Radio Hit" from judges	Best Performer of the Week	Immune	Safe	Danger Zone	Originally in Danger Zone, but was saved from Squad Boss of the week	Bottom 2	Eliminated

Order	Squad	Rapper	Judges		Squad Bosses				Total Score	Judges' Decision	Public Voting	Battle Result
Order	Squad	Rapper	Raftaar	Ikka	Dee MC	Dino James	EPR	Raga	Total Score	Judges' Decision	Public Voting	Battle Result
1	EPR Rebels	Naam Sujal			10	10	-	10	30	Immune	-	-
2	Raga Ragers	Lashcurry			10	10	10	-	30	Safe	-	-
3	Dee MC Dynamites	Dharmik			-	10	10	10	30		-	-
4	Dino Warriors	Ajitesh Bhati			8	-	10	10	28	Immune	-	-
5	Dee MC Dynamites	PHO			-	10	10	10	30	Immune	-	-
6	EPR Rebels	K!LLSWITCH			7	7	-	10	24	Immune	-	-
7	Dino Warriors	Danish			9	-	9	9	27	Immune	-	-
8	Dee MC Dynamites	Sense			-	9	7	7	23	Danger Zone	Bottom 2	Safe
9	Raga Ragers	Devil The Rhymer			7	7	8	-	22	Danger Zone	Bottom 2	Eliminated
10	EPR Rebels	Ghaint Jxtt			10	10	-	10	30	Immune	-	-
11	Raga Ragers	Mad Trip			5	5	5	-	15	Danger Zone	Safe	-
12	Dino Warriors	99side			9	-	10	10	29	Immune	-	-
13	Raga Ragers	Siyaahi			9	10	10	-	29	Immune	-	-
14	Dino Warriors	Little Bhatia			9	-	9	8	26	Safe	-	-
15	EPR Rebels	Vichaar			10	10	-	10	30	Immune	-	-
16	Dee MC Dynamites	Rajjo			-	6	6	7	19	Danger Zone	Saved	-

==== Week 5 (Episode 9–10): Imagery ====
This week's squad of the week, Raga had to choose to save one of the four Rappers in Danger Zone. He chose Mad Trip.

Key	"Radio Hit" from judges	Best Performer of the Week	Immune	Safe	Danger Zone	Originally in Danger Zone, but was saved from Squad Boss of the week	Bottom 2	Eliminated

Order	Squad	Rapper	Judges	Squad Bosses				Total Score	Judges' Decision	Public Voting	Battle Result
Order	Squad	Rapper	Raftaar & Ikka	Dee MC	Dino James	EPR	Raga	Total Score	Judges' Decision	Public Voting	Battle Result
1	Raga Ragers	Lashcurry		10	10	10	-	30		-	-
2	Dee MC Dynamites	Sense		-	8	10	10	28	Immune	-	-
3	EPR Rebels	Ghaint Jxtt		7	7	-	8	22	Safe	-	-
4	Dee MC Dynamites	Dharmik		-	10	10	10	30	Immune	-	-
5	Dino Warriors	Danish		7	-	7	7	21	Danger Zone	Bottom 2	Safe
6	Dino Warriors	Ajitesh Bhati		8	-	6	9	23	Immune	-	-
7	EPR Rebels	Vichaar		10	9	-	9	28	Safe	-	-
8	Dee MC Dynamites	Rajjo		-	6	7	6	19	Danger Zone	Bottom 2	Eliminated
9	Dino Warriors	Little Bhatia		7	-	7	7	21	Danger Zone	Safe	-
10	Raga Ragers	Siyaahi		10	10	8	-	28	Immune	-	-
11	Dino Warriors	99side		10	-	10	10	30	Immune	-	-
12	Dee MC Dynamites	PHO		-	8	8	7	23	Safe	-	-
13	EPR Rebels	Naam Sujal		10	10	-	10	30	Immune	-	-
14	EPR Rebels	K!LLSWITCH		9	9	-	8	26	Safe	-	-
15	Raga Ragers	Mad Trip		4	5	5	-	14	Danger Zone	Saved	-

==== Week 6 (Episode 11–12): hustle flip ====
This week's squad of the week, Dee MC had to choose to save one of the six Rappers in Danger Zone. She chose Pho. There was no Battle this week, two rappers with the fewest votes were eliminated.

Key	"Radio Hit" from judges	Best Performer of the Week	Immune	Danger Zone	Originally in Danger Zone, but was saved from Squad Boss of the week	Eliminated

Order	Squad	Rapper	Judges	Squad Bosses				Total Score	Judges' Decision	Public Voting
Order	Squad	Rapper	Raftaar & Ikka	Dee MC	Dino James	EPR	Raga	Total Score	Judges' Decision	Public Voting
1	Dino Warriors	99side		10	-	10	10	30	Immune	-
2	Raga Ragers	Mad Trip		10	10	10	-	30	Immune	-
3	Raga Ragers	Siyaahi		7	10	8	-	25	Danger Zone	Safe
4	EPR Rebels	Naam Sujal		10	10	-	10	30		-
5	Dino Warriors	Little Bhatia		9	-	9	8	26	Danger Zone	Safe
6	Dee MC Dynamites	Dharmik		-	8	9	9	26	Immune	-
7	EPR Rebels	Ghaint Jxtt		8	7	-	7	22	Danger Zone	Safe
8	Raga Ragers	Lashcurry		10	10	9	-	29	Immune	-
9	Dee MC Dynamites	Sense		-	10	10	10	30	Immune	
10	Dee MC Dynamites	Pho		-	5	5	5	15	Danger Zone	Saved
11	Dino Warriors	Ajitesh Bhati		9	-	10	10	29	Immune	-
12	Dino Warriors	Danish		8	-	7	6	21	Danger Zone	Eliminated
13	EPR Rebels	Vichaar		8	8	-	8	24	Immune	-
14	EPR Rebels	K!LLSWITCH		9	7	-	6	22	Danger Zone	Eliminated

==== Week 7 (Episode 13–14): Power Move ====
99side was the Rap Royalty and moved directly to the Finale. No elimination this week, this week's public votes and score were moved forward to next week.

Key	"Radio Hit" from judges	Best Performer of the Week	Rap Royalty	Immune	Safe

Order	Squad	Rapper	Judges	Squad Bosses				Total Score	Judges' Decision
Order	Squad	Rapper	Raftaar & Ikka	Dee MC	Dino James	EPR	Raga	Total Score	Judges' Decision
1	Dino Warriors	Little Bhatia		10	-	10	9	29	Immune
2	Raga Ragers	Mad Trip		10	10	10	-	30	
3	Dee MC Dynamites	Dharmik		-	10	10	9	29	Immune
4	Dino Warriors	99side		10	-	10	10	30	Rap Royalty
5	EPR Rebels	Vichaar		10	10	-	10	30	Immune
6	Dee MC Dynamites	PHO		-	8	10	9	27	Safe
7	EPR Rebels	Ghaint Jxtt		9	9	-	10	28	Immune
8	EPR Rebels	Naam Sujal		10	10	-	10	30	Immune
9	Raga Ragers	Lashcurry		8	9	8	-	25	Safe
10	Dino Warriors	Ajitesh Bhati		9	-	10	10	29	Immune
11	Raga Ragers	Siyaahi		9	10	10	-	29	Safe
12	Dee MC Dynamites	Sense		-	10	10	8	28	Immune

==== Week 8 (Episode 15–16): Collab week ====
This week rappers had to collab with other rappers and perform a number. As last week's Rap Royalty, 99side collabed with former contestant Gravity.

Also each squad performed a group Ad collab for the sponsors of the show.

- Dino Warriors: Royal Enfield Hunter
- EPR Rebels: boAt
- Raga Ragers: Wok Tok by Veeba
- Dee MC Dynamites: Myntra - Fresh AF Drops

Dharmik was the Rap Royalty and moved directly to the Finale.

Key	"Radio Hit" from judges	Best Performers of the Week	Rap Royalty	Finalist	Immune	Safe	Danger Zone	Bottom 2	Eliminated

Order	Squad	Rapper	Judges	Squad Bosses				Total Score	Judges' Decision	Public Voting	Battle Result
Order	Squad	Rapper	Raftaar & Ikka	Dee MC	Dino James	EPR	Raga	Total Score	Judges' Decision	Public Voting	Battle Result
1	EPR Rebels	Naam Sujal		7	8	8	8	31	Safe	-	-
1	EPR Rebels	Vichaar		7	8	8	8	31	Safe	-	-
2	Raga Ragers	Lashcurry		7	9	7	8	31	Immune	-	-
2	Dee MC Dynamites	PHO		7	9	7	8	31	Immune	-	-
2	Raga Ragers	Siyaahi		7	9	7	8	31	Immune	-	-
3	Dino Warriors	99side		Finalist							
4	Dino Warriors	Little Bhatia		8	7	6	7	28	Danger Zone	Bottom 3	Eliminated
4	Raga Ragers	Mad Trip		8	7	6	7	28	Danger Zone	Safe	-
5	Dee MC Dynamites	Dharmik		10	10	10	10	40	+ Rap Royalty	-	-
5	Dee MC Dynamites	Sense		10	10	10	10	40		-	-
6	Dino Warriors	Ajitesh Bhati		7	7	6	7	27	Danger Zone	Bottom 3	Eliminated
6	EPR Rebels	Ghaint Jxtt		7	7	6	7	27	Danger Zone	Bottom 3	Safe

==== Week 9 (Episode 17–18): The Ultimate BattleVerse ====
Eight rappers battled it out in the Ultimate BattleVerse, with only four making it to the Finale.

Key	"Radio Hit" from judges	Best Performers of the Week	Rap Royalty	Eliminated

Battle No.	Rappers (Squad)			Battle Result	
1	Siyaahi (Raga Ragers)	vs	Vichaar (EPR Rebels)	Siyaahi	Vichaar
2	PHO (Dee MC Dynamites)	vs	Mad Trip (Raga Ragers)	PHO	Mad Trip
3	Naam Sujal (EPR Rebels)	vs	Lashcurry (Raga Ragers)	Naam Sujal	Lashcurry
4	Ghaint Jxtt (EPR Rebels)	vs	Sense (Dee MC Dynamites)	Ghaint Jxtt	Sense

Top 6 finalists performed for the public and the public voting were open for final time, with the votes deciding the winner next week.

Order	Squad	Rapper	Judges' Decision
1	Dino Warriors	99side	
2	Raga Ragers	Lashcurry	
3	Dee MC Dynamites	Dharmik	
4	Raga Ragers	Siyaahi	
5	EPR Rebels	Naam Sujal	
6	EPR Rebels	Vichaar	

==== Winners ====
- Lashcurry – Winner of Hustle 4
- Naam Sujal -- Runner up

==== Observation ====
MTV Hustle season 1 winner M-Zee Bella supported Lashcurry. MTV Hustle season 2 winner MC Square supported Naam Sujal. MTV Hustle season 3 winner Uday Pandhi supported Dharmik. The results were announced and winner of Season 1 supported, occupied first position, similarly who winner of Season 2 supported, occupied second position and lastly, who winner of Season 3 supported, occupied third position. Appreciative arrangement for maintaining the winners' legacy.

=== Guests ===
Week	Episode(s)	Guest Judge(s)	Episode(s)	Guest Appearance
2	3-4	none	4	M Zee Bella (Season 1 - Winner)
3	5-6	King (Season 1 - Contestant & Season 2 - Squad Boss)	none	
4	7-8	Encore ABJ & Calm (Seedhe Maut)	none	
5	9-10	none	9	Kayden Sharma (Season 3 - Finalist)
5	9-10	none	10	Panther (Season 2 - Contestant)
6	11-12	Badshah	none	
7	13-14	Raja Kumari	none	
8	15	Naezy	15	Gravity (Season 2 - Finalist)
8	15	Naezy	16	Riar Saab & Sambata
9	17-18	none	18	Shah Rule
10	19-20	Sunidhi Chauhan	19-20	Srushti Tawade (Season 2 - Contestant)
10	19-20	Sunidhi Chauhan	19-20	M Zee Bella (Season 1 - Winner)
10	19-20	Sunidhi Chauhan	19-20	Paradox (Season 2 - Runner-up)
10	19-20	Sunidhi Chauhan	20	MC Square (Season 2 - Winner)
10	19-20	Sunidhi Chauhan	20	Uday Pandhi (Season 3 - Winner)

== Season 5 ==
The fifth season also known as MTV Hustle 5: ‘Apna Homeground’, premiered on August 8, 2026, on MTV India, Jio Hotstar and Netflix.

=== Judges and host ===
Badshah returned as the judge to replace Raftaar and Ikka from the previous season and squad boss EPR returned to judge. Agsy, MC Square, and Paradox, who were contestants in the previous seasons, joined as the new squad bosses.

=== Contestants ===
Contestant	Stage Name	Entered	Finish	Place
Daksh	Dhadkan	Episode 1	Episode 20	Winner
Akshay Mutha	WhysoKai	Episode 1	Episode 20	Runner-Up
Harmeeet	Harmeeet	Episode 1	Episode 20	3
Bhaskar Mishra	Dflacko	Episode 1	Episode 20	4
Ansh Sharma	Ansh4sure	Episode 1	Episode 20	5
Yashraj Mishra	Raaj Babu	Episode 1	Episode 20	6
Akshat Jakhar	Akshat Jakhar	Episode 1	Episode 18	7-11
Keshav Bhugra	Bhaktaaa	Episode 1	Episode 18	7-11
Anand Mishra	Farak	Episode 1	Episode 18	7-11
Parv Sharma	Parv	Episode 1	Episode 18	7-11
Shrey Verma	SickLot	Episode 11	Episode 18	7-11
Siroyi	Siroyi	Episode 1	Episode 16	12
Tehran	OG Tehran	Episode 1	Episode 14	13-14
Rahul Tacho	Txama	Episode 1	Episode 14	13-14
Mridul	R-Mridul	Episode 1	Episode 12	15
Shivam Singh	Xeemo	Episode 1	Episode 9	16
Anushka Baduwal	Anushka	Episode 1	Episode 5	17
Akkshay Gurjar	Akkshay Gurjar	Episode 11	Episode 12	18-25
Mukesh	MTrill	Episode 11	Episode 12	18-25
Sumit Kumar	Vyaas	Episode 11	Episode 12	18-25
Karan Verma	Eddy	Episode 1	Episode 2	18-25
Gargi	Gargi	Episode 1	Episode 2	18-25
Hruday	Hruday	Episode 1	Episode 2	18-25
Yashad Gupta	Split	Episode 1	Episode 2	18-25
Vasu Kainth	Vasu	Episode 1	Episode 2	18-25

Male
Female

=== Squads ===
==== Episode 1-6 ====
Agsy Alphas	EPR Rebels	Para Troopers	Square Lambardars
OG Tehran	Raaj Babu	Txama	Farak
Dflacko	R-Mridul	Dhadkan	Akshat Jakhar
Harmeeet	Xeemo	Siroyi	Bhaktaaa
Anushka	Parv	WhysoKai	Ansh4sure

==== Episode 7-12 ====
Agsy Alphas	EPR Rebels	Para Troopers	Square Lambardars
OG Tehran	Raaj Babu	Txama	Farak
Harmeeet	R-Mridul	Dhadkan	Akshat Jakhar
WhysoKai	Xeemo	Siroyi	Bhaktaaa
-	Parv	Dflacko	Ansh4sure

==== Episode 13-20 ====
Agsy Alphas	EPR Rebels	Para Troopers	Square Lambardars
OG Tehran	Raaj Babu	Txama	Farak
Harmeeet	Parv	Dhadkan	Akshat Jakhar
WhysoKai	SickLot	Siroyi	Bhaktaaa
-		Dflacko	Ansh4sure

==== Squad and Performer of the week ====
Week	Squad of the Week	Performer(s) of the Week
Week 2	EPR Rebels	none
Week 3	EPR Rebels	Dhadkan
Week 4	Square Lambardars	WhysoKai
Week 5	Square Lambardars	OG Tehran
Week 6	Square Lambardars	Bhaktaaa
Week 6	Square Lambardars	SickLot (Wild-card Challenger)
Week 7	Para Troopers	Dflacko Siroyi
Week 8	none	Parv
Week 8	none	WhysoKai
Week 9	none	Harmeeet
-	Squad of the Season	
Week 10	Para Troopers	

=== Summary ===
Squad		Contestant	Week 1	Week 2	Week 3	Week 4	Week 5	Week 6	Week 7	Week 8	Week 9	Week 10	Total
Para Troopers		Dhadkan	SAFE	27	30	30	17	SAFE	38	47	Finalist	Winner	189
PT	AA	WhysoKai	BTM	25	28	29	15	47	32	50	Finalist	Runner-Up	226
Agsy Alphas		Harmeeet	SAFE	30	21	30	16	SAFE	30	41	Finalist	3rd Place	168
AA	PT	Dflacko	SAFE	26	28	23	14	SAFE	40	39	Finalist	4th Place	170
Square Lambardars		Ansh4sure	SAFE	20	18	30	19	SAFE	35	42	Finalist	5th Place	164
EPR Rebels		Raaj Babu	SAFE	30	27	29	18	SAFE	36	39	Finalist	6th Place	179
Square Lambardars		Akshat Jakhar	SAFE	30	27	18	17	SAFE	34	41	ELIM	Guest	167
Square Lambardars		Bhaktaaa	SAFE	27	25	29	16	50	37	47	ELIM	Guest	231
Square Lambardars		Farak	SAFE	24	23	21	18	SAFE	32	41	ELIM	Guest	159
EPR Rebels		Parv	SAFE	27	30	30	15	SAFE	37	50	ELIM	Guest	189
EPR Rebels		SickLot	Not in Competition					50	37	42	ELIM	Guest	129
Para Troopers		Siroyi	SAFE	22	25	24	14	SAFE	40	41		Guest	166
Agsy Alphas		OG Tehran	SAFE	26	29	24	20	SAFE	28			Guest	127
Para Troopers		Txama	SAFE	22	26	18	11	49	31			Guest	157
EPR Rebels		R-Mridul	SAFE	30	25	16	15	46				Guest	132
-		Akkshay Gurjar	Not in Competition					41					41
-		Vyaas	Not in Competition					40					40
-		MTrill	Not in Competition					33					33
EPR Rebels		Xeemo	SAFE	22	27	18	ELIM					Guest	67
Agsy Alphas		Anushka	BTM	23	ELIM							Guest	23
-		Eddy	ELIM										0
-		Gargi	ELIM										0
-		Hruday	ELIM										0
-		Split	ELIM										0
-		Vasu	ELIM										0

==== Notes ====
"Bold Numbers" represent "Playlisted" received from main judge
Finalist
Best Performer of the week
Received positive critics and was declared safe
Safe
Received negative critics and was in Danger Zone but was declared safe
Bottom
Eliminated
Finalist
Runner-up
Winner
Guest

=== Weekly summary ===
==== Week 1 (Episode 1–2): Squad Selection Week ====
During Week 1, each contestant performed individually in front of the Squad Bosses. During a performance, the Squad Bosses could select a contestant by giving them a Mic Drop. A contestant needed to receive at least three Mic Drop votes from the Squad Bosses to become eligible for squad selection assigned by main judge Badshah, but the contestants who gets Playlisted from Badshah, they decide which squad to be assigned to.

Once a contestant is eligible, the Squad Bosses could use their Claim button to directly claim the contestant into their squad. Each Squad Boss could use the Claim button only once, and the first Squad Boss to press it successfully claimed the contestant for their squad.

Key	Mic Drop from squad boss	Claimed from squad boss	Playlisted Performer	Bottom 7	Advanced	Eliminated

Order	Rapper	Judge	Squad Bosses				Result	Squad
Order	Rapper	Badshah	Agsy	EPR	MC Square	Paradox	Result	Squad
1	OG Tehran						Advanced	Agsy Alphas
2	Raaj Babu						Advanced	EPR Rebels
3	Farak						Advanced	Square Lambardars
4	Gargi						32-bar Round	-
5	R-Mridul						Advanced	EPR Rebels
6	Anushka						32-bar Round	-
7	Txama						Advanced	Para Troopers
8	Vasu						32-bar Round	-
9	Hruday						32-bar Round	-
10	Dflacko						Advanced	Agsy Alphas
11	Dhadkan						Advanced	Para Troopers
12	Akshat Jakhar						Advanced	Square Lambardars
13	Xeemo						Advanced	EPR Rebels
14	Harmeeet						Advanced	Agsy Alphas
15	Parv						Advanced	EPR Rebels
16	Eddy						32-bar Round	-
17	Bhaktaaa						Advanced	Square Lambardars
18	Split						32-bar Round	-
19	Siroyi						Advanced	Para Troopers
20	Ansh4sure						Advanced	Square Lambardars
21	WhysoKai						32-bar Round	-

===== 32-bar Challenge =====
Seven contestants from 32-bars round battled it out in the Battleground, with only two making it to the next round.

Order	Rapper	Result	Squad
1	Eddy	Eliminated	-
2	Split	Eliminated	-
3	Gargi	Eliminated	-
4	Anushka	Advanced	Agsy Alphas
5	Vasu	Eliminated	-
6	Hruday	Eliminated	-
7	WhysoKai	Advanced	Para Troopers

==== Week 2 (Episode 3–4): Squad Wars ====
From this week, the squad bosses & judge Badshah scored out of 10 after each performance. The squad with the highest score will be the Squad of the Week and get a Power Card. This week's squad of the week, EPR received Power Card of Immunity, which can be used on one of the Rappers next week.

The 2 winning squads' four rappers were immune and the contestants who gets Playlisted from Badshah will also be immune. The bottom two rappers from two losing squads were in the bottom and faced the public vote, with the votes effecting the next week's elimination. No elimination this week.

Key	Playlisted by Badshah	Immune	Safe	Bottom

Squad War	Round	Squad	Rapper	Judge	Squad Bosses				Total Score	Result
Squad War	Round	Squad	Rapper	Badshah	Agsy	EPR	MC Square	Paradox	Total Score	Result
Agsy Alphas vs. EPR Rebels	1	EPR Rebels	Parv	8	-	-	9	9	27	Immune (Winning Squad)
Agsy Alphas vs. EPR Rebels	1	Agsy Alphas	OG Tehran	8	-	-	8	9	25	Bottom
Agsy Alphas vs. EPR Rebels	2	EPR Rebels	Raaj Babu	10	-	-	10	10	30	Immune (Winning Squad)
Agsy Alphas vs. EPR Rebels	2	Agsy Alphas	Anushka	7	-	-	9	7	23	Bottom
Agsy Alphas vs. EPR Rebels	3	Agsy Alphas	Dflacko	9	-	-	8	9	26	Immune (Playlisted)
Agsy Alphas vs. EPR Rebels	3	EPR Rebels	R-Mridul	10	-	-	10	10	30	Immune (Winning Squad)
Agsy Alphas vs. EPR Rebels	4	EPR Rebels	Xeemo	8	-	-	7	7	22	Immune (Winning Squad)
Agsy Alphas vs. EPR Rebels	4	Agsy Alphas	Harmeeet	10	-	-	10	10	30	Immune (Playlisted)
Para Troopers vs. Square Lambardars	5	Para Troopers	Txama	8	7	7	-	-	22	Immune (Winning Squad)
Para Troopers vs. Square Lambardars	5	Square Lambardars	Akshat Jakhar	10	10	10	-	-	30	Immune (Playlisted)
Para Troopers vs. Square Lambardars	6	Square Lambardars	Farak	8	8	8	-	-	24	Bottom
Para Troopers vs. Square Lambardars	6	Para Troopers	WhysoKai	8	9	8	-	-	25	Immune (Winning Squad)
Para Troopers vs. Square Lambardars	7	Square Lambardars	Bhaktaaa	9	9	9	-	-	27	Safe
Para Troopers vs. Square Lambardars	7	Para Troopers	Dhadkan	9	9	9	-	-	27	Immune (Winning Squad)
Para Troopers vs. Square Lambardars	8	Para Troopers	Siroyi	8	7	7	-	-	22	Immune (Winning Squad)
Para Troopers vs. Square Lambardars	8	Square Lambardars	Ansh4sure	7	6	7	-	-	20	Bottom

==== Week 3 (Episode 5–6): Squad Wars - Bangers ====
===== 32-bar Challenge =====
Ansh4sure, Anushka, Farak and OG Tehran faced the public vote. Farak received the most votes and was saved from 32-bar Challenge.

Order	Squad	Rapper	Result
1	Square Lambardars	Ansh4sure	Safe
2	Agsy Alphas	Anushka	Eliminated
3	Agsy Alphas	OG Tehran	Safe

The Squad of the Week, EPR, received the Shuffle Power Card. This power allows EPR to swap one rapper from any squad with another rapper from a different squad, with the shuffle taking effect the following week. The claimed rappers cannot be shuffled. Additionally, Badshah used his special power to save the bottom two rappers, resulting in no elimination this week.

Key	Playlisted by Badshah	Best Performer of the Week	Saved by Badshah	Immune	Safe	Bottom

Squad War	Round	Squad	Rapper	Judge	Squad Bosses				Total Score	Result
Squad War	Round	Squad	Rapper	Badshah	Agsy	EPR	MC Square	Paradox	Total Score	Result
EPR Rebels vs. Square Lambardars	1	Square Lambardars	Ansh4sure	6	6	-	-	6	18	Bottom
EPR Rebels vs. Square Lambardars	1	EPR Rebels	R-Mridul	9	8	-	-	8	25	Immune (Winning Squad)
EPR Rebels vs. Square Lambardars	2	Square Lambardars	Bhaktaaa	8	8	-	-	9	25	Safe
EPR Rebels vs. Square Lambardars	2	EPR Rebels	Parv	10	10	-	-	10	30	Immune (Playlisted)
EPR Rebels vs. Square Lambardars	3	Square Lambardars	Akshat Jakhar	9	10	-	-	8	27	Immune (Winning Squad)
EPR Rebels vs. Square Lambardars	3	EPR Rebels	Raaj Babu	9	9	-	-	9	27	Immune (Winning Squad)
EPR Rebels vs. Square Lambardars	4	Square Lambardars	Farak	8	7	-	-	8	23	Bottom
EPR Rebels vs. Square Lambardars	4	EPR Rebels	Xeemo	9	9	-	-	9	27	Immune (Winning Squad)
Agsy Alphas vs. Para Troopers	5	Para Troopers	Dhadkan	10	-	10	10	-	30	Immune (Playlisted)
Agsy Alphas vs. Para Troopers	5	Agsy Alphas	Harmeeet	7	-	7	7	-	21	Immune (Winning Squad)
Agsy Alphas vs. Para Troopers	6	Para Troopers	Txama	9	-	9	9	-	26	Immune (Playlisted)
Agsy Alphas vs. Para Troopers	6	Agsy Alphas	Dflacko	9	-	10	9	-	28	Immune (Winning Squad)
Agsy Alphas vs. Para Troopers	7	Para Troopers	WhysoKai	9	-	9	10	-	28	Immune (Playlisted)
Agsy Alphas vs. Para Troopers	7	Agsy Alphas	OG Tehran	9	-	10	10	-	29	Immune (Winning Squad)
-	8	Para Troopers	Siroyi	8	-	9	8	-	25	Immune (Playlisted)

==== Week 4 (Episode 7–8): Squad Wars - Imagery week ====
EPR used the Shuffle Power Card to swap WhySoKai from Para Troopers with Dflacko from Agsy Alphas, with the swap taking effect immediately.

The Squad of the Week, MC Square, received the Shield Card. EPR used the Power Card of Immunity to save R-Mridul from the bottom.

Key	Playlisted by Badshah	Best Performer of the Week	Saved by Squad boss with Power Card	Immune	Safe	Originally in bottom, but was saved	Bottom

Squad War	Round	Squad	Rapper	Judge	Squad Bosses				Total Score	Result
Squad War	Round	Squad	Rapper	Badshah	Agsy	EPR	MC Square	Paradox	Total Score	Result
Agsy Alphas vs. Square Lambardars	1	Agsy Alphas	OG Tehran	8	-	8	-	8	24	Bottom
Agsy Alphas vs. Square Lambardars	1	Square Lambardars	Bhaktaaa	9	-	10	-	10	29	Immune (Winning Squad)
Agsy Alphas vs. Square Lambardars	2	Agsy Alphas	WhysoKai	10	-	10	-	9	29	Immune (Playlisted)
Agsy Alphas vs. Square Lambardars	2	Square Lambardars	Ansh4sure	10	-	10	-	10	30	Immune (Winning Squad)
Agsy Alphas vs. Square Lambardars	3	Agsy Alphas	Harmeeet	10	-	10	-	10	30	Immune (Playlisted)
Agsy Alphas vs. Square Lambardars	3	Square Lambardars	Akshat Jakhar	7	-	6	-	5	18	Immune (Winning Squad)
-	4	Square Lambardars	Farak	7	-	7	-	7	21	Immune (Winning Squad)
EPR Rebels vs. Para Troopers	5	Para Troopers	Dhadkan	10	10	-	10	-	30	Immune (Winning Squad)
EPR Rebels vs. Para Troopers	5	EPR Rebels	Raaj Babu	9	10	-	10	-	29	Safe
EPR Rebels vs. Para Troopers	6	Para Troopers	Siroyi	8	8	-	8	-	24	Immune (Winning Squad)
EPR Rebels vs. Para Troopers	6	EPR Rebels	Parv	10	10	-	10	-	30	Safe
EPR Rebels vs. Para Troopers	7	Para Troopers	Txama	6	6	-	6	-	18	Immune (Winning Squad)
EPR Rebels vs. Para Troopers	7	EPR Rebels	Xeemo	6	6	-	6	-	18	Bottom
EPR Rebels vs. Para Troopers	8	Para Troopers	Dflacko	8	8	-	7	-	23	Immune (Winning Squad)
EPR Rebels vs. Para Troopers	8	EPR Rebels	R-Mridul	5	6	-	5	-	16	Saved

==== Week 5 (Episode 9–10): Internal Squad Wars ====
===== 32-bar Challenge =====
As there were only two rappers in the bottom, no public vote was held, and both were directly in the 32-Bar Challenge.

Order	Squad	Rapper	Result
1	Agsy Alphas	OG Tehran	Safe
2	EPR Rebels	Xeemo	Eliminated

This week featured the Internal Squad Wars. The lowest-scoring rapper from each squad was placed in the bottom and battle against a Wild Card rapper. Squad Bosses were not eligible to score, only Badshah and guest judge Ikka scored each performance out of 10.

MC Square used the Shield Card to protect Farak from the bottom.

Key	Playlisted by Badshah	Best Performer of the Week	Saved by Squad boss with Power Card	Immune	Safe	Bottom

Order	Squad	Rapper	Judge	Guest Judge	Total Score	Result
Order	Squad	Rapper	Badshah	Ikka	Total Score	Result
1	Square Lambardars	Ansh4sure	9	10	19	Safe
2	Square Lambardars	Akshat Jakhar	9	8	17	Safe
3	Square Lambardars	Bhaktaaa	9	7	16	Bottom
4	Square Lambardars	Farak	9	9	18	Immune
5	Para Troopers	Txama	6	5	11	Bottom
6	Para Troopers	Dhadkan	8	9	17	Safe
7	Para Troopers	Siroyi	7	7	14	Safe
8	Para Troopers	Dflacko	7	7	14	Safe
9	EPR Rebels	Parv	8	7	15	Safe
10	EPR Rebels	R-Mridul	8	7	15	Bottom
11	EPR Rebels	Raaj Babu	9	9	18	Safe
12	Agsy Alphas	WhysoKai	8	7	15	Bottom
13	Agsy Alphas	OG Tehran	10	10	20	Safe
14	Agsy Alphas	Harmeeet	8	8	16	Safe

==== Week 6 (Episode 11–12): Wild-card Challengers ====
Last week's bottom four rappers competed against four wild-card rappers. The performances were judged by the four Squad Bosses and Badshah, with each awarding a score out of 10. The four rappers with the lowest total scores were eliminated from the competition.

SickLot was selected and joined EPR Rebels Squad.

Key	Playlisted by Badshah	Best Performer of the Week	Saved by Squad boss with Power Card	Immune	Safe	Bottom

Order	Squad	Rapper	Judge	Squad Bosses				Total Score	Result
Order	Squad	Rapper	Badshah	Agsy	EPR	MC Square	Paradox	Total Score	Result
1	Square Lambardars	Bhaktaaa	10	10	10	10	10	50	Safe
2	Wild-card Challenger	Vyaas	7	8	8	8	9	40	Eliminated
3	Para Troopers	Txama	9	10	10	10	10	49	Safe
4	Wild-card Challenger	Akkshay Gurjar	8	8	8	8	9	41	Eliminated
5	EPR Rebels	R-Mridul	9	9	9	9	10	46	Eliminated
6	Wild-card Challenger	MTrill	6	7	6	7	7	33	Eliminated
7	Agsy Alphas	WhysoKai	10	9	10	9	9	47	Safe
8	Wild-card Challenger	SickLot	10	10	10	10	10	50	Safe

==== Week 7 (Episode 13–14): Industry Ready! ====
From this week onward, public voting was open throughout the week, affecting the rappers in the bottom.

Key	Playlisted by Badshah	Best Performer of the Week	Safe	Bottom	Saved by Public Votes	Bottom 4	Eliminated

Order	Squad	Rapper	Judge	Squad Bosses				Total Score	Result	Public Voting	32-bar Challenge
Order	Squad	Rapper	Badshah	Agsy	EPR	MC Square	Paradox	Total Score	Result	Public Voting	32-bar Challenge
1	Agsy Alphas	WhysoKai	8	-	8	8	8	32	Bottom	Saved	-
2	Square Lambardars	Bhaktaaa	9	9	10	-	9	37	Safe	-	-
3	Para Troopers	Dhadkan	10	9	9	10	-	38	Safe	-	-
4	EPR Rebels	SickLot	9	9	-	9	10	37	Safe	-	-
5	Square Lambardars	Akshat Jakhar	8	9	8	-	9	34	Safe	-	-
6	EPR Rebels	Raaj Babu	8	9	-	9	10	36	Safe	-	-
7	Agsy Alphas	Harmeeet	7	-	7	8	8	30	Bottom	Bottom 4	Safe
8	Para Troopers	Siroyi	10	10	10	10	-	40	Safe	-	-
9	EPR Rebels	Parv	9	9	-	9	10	37	Safe	-	-
10	Square Lambardars	Ansh4sure	8	9	9	-	9	35	Safe	-	-
11	Para Troopers	Txama	8	7	8	8	-	31	Bottom	Bottom 4	Eliminated
12	Agsy Alphas	OG Tehran	7	-	7	7	7	28	Bottom	Bottom 4	Eliminated
13	Square Lambardars	Farak	8	8	8	-	8	32	Bottom	Bottom 4	Safe
14	Para Troopers	Dflacko	10	10	10	10	-	40	Safe	-	-

==== Week 8 (Episode 15–16): Collab Week ====
This week contestants collaborated and performed in pairs.

Also each squad performed a group Ad Jingle for the sponsors of the show.

- EPR Rebels: Gulf Pride
- Para Troopers: Tic Tac
- Square Lambardars: Wild Stone
- Agsy Alphas: Hmd Vibe 2

Dhadkan won the ticket to Finale.

Key	Playlisted by Badshah	Best Performer of the Week	Ticket to Finale	Safe	Bottom	Saved by Public Votes	Bottom 5	Eliminated

Order	Squad	Rapper	Judge	Squad Bosses				Total Score	Result	Public Voting	32-bar Challenge
Order	Squad	Rapper	Badshah	Agsy	EPR	MC Square	Paradox	Total Score	Result	Public Voting	32-bar Challenge
1	Square Lambardars	Ansh4sure	9	8	8	8	9	42	Safe	-	-
1	EPR Rebels	SickLot	9	8	8	8	9	42	Safe	-	-
2	Square Lambardars	Akshat Jakhar	8	8	8	9	8	41	Bottom	Bottom 5	Safe
2	Agsy Alphas	Harmeeet	8	8	8	9	8	41	Bottom	Saved	-
3	EPR Rebels	Parv	10	10	10	10	10	50	Safe	-	-
3	Agsy Alphas	WhysoKai	10	10	10	10	10	50	Safe	-	-
4	Square Lambardars	Bhaktaaa	10	9	9	9	10	47	Safe	-	-
4	Para Troopers	Dhadkan	10	9	9	9	10	47	Ticket to Finale	-	-
5	Square Lambardars	Farak	8	7	8	9	9	41	Bottom	Bottom 5	Safe
5	Para Troopers	Siroyi	8	7	8	9	9	41	Bottom	Bottom 5	Eliminated
6	EPR Rebels	Raaj Babu	8	7	8	7	9	39	Bottom	Bottom 5	Safe
6	Para Troopers	Dflacko	8	7	8	7	9	39	Bottom	Bottom 5	Safe

==== Week 9 (Episode 17–18): Semi-Final Week - Battleground ====
Ten rappers battled it out in the Battleground, with only five making it to the Finale. Top 6 finalists public voting were open for final time, with the votes deciding the winner next week.

Key	Best Performer of the Week	Finalist	Eliminated

Battle No.	Battle Topic	Rappers (Squad)			Battle Result	
1	Battle of Representation	Raaj Babu (EPR Rebels)	vs	Akshat Jakhar (Square Lambardars)	Raaj Babu (EPR Rebels)	Akshat Jakhar (Square Lambardars)
2	Battle of Flows	SickLot (EPR Rebels)	vs	Parv (EPR Rebels)	Parv (EPR Rebels)	SickLot (EPR Rebels)
3	Battle of Poetry	Farak (Square Lambardars)	vs	Harmeeet (Agsy Alphas)	Harmeeet (Agsy Alphas)	Farak (Square Lambardars)
4	Battle of Flex	WhysoKai (Agsy Alphas)	vs	Dflacko (Para Troopers)	Dflacko (Para Troopers)	WhysoKai (Agsy Alphas)
5	Battle of Two Gs	Ansh4sure (Square Lambardars)	vs	Bhaktaaa (Square Lambardars)	Ansh4sure (Square Lambardars)	Bhaktaaa (Square Lambardars)

==== Week 10 (Episode 19–20): Grand Finale ====
The winner received a cash prize of ₹1,00,00,000, a gift hamper from HMD Vibe 2 Pro and a Rare'z by Rare Rabbit voucher worth ₹1,00,000. The runner-up received a cash prize of ₹10,00,000, while each finalist received ₹1,00,000.

Para Troopers won the Squad of the Season award and Dflacko won the Most Stylish Performer award presented by Rare'z by Rare Rabbit.

The following special awards were also presented:

Order	Award	Nominees	Winner
1	Bar of the Season	Akshat Jakhar; Dhadkan; Harmeeet; Bhaktaaa; R-Mridul	Harmeeet
2	Quotable of the Season	Dhadkan; Dflacko; WhysoKai; Farak; Bhaktaaa	Dflacko
3	Flow of the Season	Dhadkan; Parv & WhysoKai; OG Tehran; SickLot; WhysoKai	SickLot
4	Hook of the Season	Dhadkan; OG Tehran; Ansh4sure; Raaj Babu; WhysoKai	Ansh4sure
5	Most Replayable Track	Harmeeet; Farak; Siroyi; Dhadkan; Bhaktaaa	Dhadkan

After Top 6 finalists performed, based on public votes and judges' decision the winner was crowned.

Performance Order	Squad	Rapper	Final Result
1	Square Lambardars	Ansh4sure	Fifth Place
2	Para Troopers	Dflacko	Fourth Place
3	Agsy Alphas	Harmeeet	Third Place
4	Agsy Alphas	WhysoKai	Runner up
5	EPR Rebels	Raaj Babu	Sixth Place
6	Para Troopers	Dhadkan	Winner

=== Guests ===
Week	Episode(s)	Guest Judge(s)	Episode(s)	Guest Appearance
3	5-6	King (Season 1 - Contestant & Season 2 - Squad Boss)	none	
4	7-8	none	7	Vichaar (Season 4 - Contestant)
5	9-10	Ikka Singh (Season 3 - Squad Boss & Season 4 - Judge)	none	
6	11-12	Dino James (Season 2 to 4 - Squad Boss)	none	
7	13	Kunal Khemu	13	Khillari, Kanfuzion and Irfana
8	15-16	none	15	Fatima Sana Shaikh
8	15-16	none	16	Bob B. Randhawa
9	17	Raja Kumari (Season 1 - Judge)	17	Gravity (Season 2 - Finalist) and Nazz (Season 2 - Contestant)
9	18	Prince Narula	18	Spectra (Season 2 - Finalist) and Siyaahi (Season 4 - Finalist)
10	19-20	Ikka Singh (Season 3 - Squad Boss & Season 4 - Judge) and Dino James (Season 2 to Season 4 - Squad Boss)	19	Nikhita Gandhi; M-Zee Bella (Season 1 - Winner); MC Heam (Season 1 - Contestant)
10	19-20	Ikka Singh (Season 3 - Squad Boss & Season 4 - Judge) and Dino James (Season 2 to Season 4 - Squad Boss)	20	Reet Talwar

== Controversy ==
During the fourth season of MTV Hustle, internet personality Rohan Cariappa, who rose to fame for his content covering the Indian hip-hop scene, shared a video on November 30, 2025, on his YouTube channel, which pointed out that judge Ikka, was wearing a Harley-Davidson jacket on the Royal Enfield sponsored show. Cariappa was soon met with at least fifty copyright strikes on his videos covering the show, which led to YouTube issuing a warning of his channel being shut down on December 7. Soon, the show was met with widespread backlash by netizens and the hashtag #ShameOnMTVHUSTLE started trending on Twitter to support Cariappa. Indian rappers like Yashraj, Encore ABJ, Badshah, Raja Kumari, and YouTubers like Samay Raina, Arpit Bala, RAPBOT, Prakhar Gupta spoke out against the injustice. Raftaar, who was a judge on the show, told the audience to be patient and requested the show makers, to "meet in the middle and let’s make it happen", while boAt, one of the sponsors of the show, also expressed their dissent regarding the action. Cariappa eventually issued a written apology on Twitter, on December 6 and shared an apology video, a day after, where he thanked the audience, content creators and rappers who supported him.
