= Cult.fit =

Indian fitness company

- Type: Private
- Industry: Fitness, Healthcare
- Founded: 2016; 10 years ago in Bengaluru, Karnataka, India
- Headquarters: Bengaluru, India
- Number of locations: 708 fitness centres (2026)
- Area served: India
- Key people: Mukesh Bansal (Chairman and Managing Director); Naresh Krishnaswamy (CEO)
- Brands: Cult.fit, Cultsport, Gold's Gym (India)
- Revenue: ₹1,720.61 crore (US$180 million) (FY2026)
- Website: www.cult.fit

Cult.fit is an Indian fitness company with its headquarters in Bengaluru. It was founded in 2016 by Mukesh Bansal and Ankit Nagori as CureFit. The company provides fitness services at physical centres and through a mobile application, and it sells fitness products such as equipment, apparel and footwear.

As of 31 March 2026, Cult.fit operated 708 fitness centres across 77 Indian cities and reported approximately 987,000 paid fitness members. In July 2026, it filed a draft red herring prospectus with the Securities and Exchange Board of India for an initial public offering.

== History ==
Mukesh Bansal and Ankit Nagori established CureFit in 2016 after leaving Flipkart. CureFit was established to operate in several areas of consumer health and wellness.

In August 2016, CureFit acquired a majority interest in Cult, a Bengaluru fitness startup run by Rishabh Telang, which became the basis of its fitness services at physical centres.

CureFit later launched additional businesses: Cult.fit for fitness services, Eat.fit for food and meal subscriptions, Mind.fit for yoga and mental wellness, and Care.fit for primary healthcare. It gradually concentrated on fitness services and fitness products, and separated or discontinued some of the other businesses.

=== Expansion of the fitness-centre network ===
Cult.fit first extended its fitness-centre operations from Bengaluru to Delhi-NCR, Mumbai and Hyderabad.

In 2018, CureFit acquired Fitness First India and merged it with its Cult.fit operations. At that point Cult.fit had more than 40 centres, and the combined business was expected to operate over 50 centres across India. The acquisition expanded its operations in Delhi-NCR and Mumbai.

The company began adding franchised centres in 2020. In February 2022, it acquired a majority stake in F2 Fun & Fitness India, the master franchisee for Gold's Gym in India, a transaction that added about 140 Gold's Gym centres and extended Cult.fit into more cities and non-metropolitan markets.

By March 2026, the network had reached 708 fitness centres across 77 cities, of which about 70% were run by franchise partners.

=== COVID-19 pandemic and business restructuring ===
The closure of physical centres during the COVID-19 pandemic led Cult.fit to expand its digital fitness services, including live online workout classes. During this period the company also reduced its workforce and closed some locations.

In October 2020, Eat.fit was separated into an independent company, Curefoods, through an equity-swap arrangement. Nagori became head of Curefoods and left his operating roles at Cult.fit.

The company subsequently shifted its focus back to its physical fitness-centre network, with expansion mainly through franchising and acquisitions.

=== Funding and leadership ===
CureFit raised capital from investors including Accel, Kalaari Capital, Chiratae Ventures, Tata Digital, Zomato and Temasek. In November 2021, a round led by Zomato, with participation from Tata Digital, valued the company at approximately US$1.5 billion.

In 2024, Naresh Krishnaswamy, previously head of growth and marketing, was appointed chief executive officer, and Bansal became chairman.

In 2026, Temasek made an additional investment in Cult.fit. By the time of its draft IPO filing, the company had raised more than US$670 million.

In 2017, the actor Hrithik Roshan entered a five-year agreement with CureFit as a brand ambassador. Roshan remained a shareholder, and the company's 2026 draft offer documents identified him among the shareholders proposing to sell part of their holdings through the offer-for-sale component of the planned IPO.

== Operations ==
=== Fitness services ===
Cult.fit's original format consists of trainer-led group classes, including strength training, yoga and dance fitness. It also provides access to conventional gyms. The company introduced a consumer mobile application early in its development; it offers live and recorded online workout classes.

=== Fitness products ===
Cult.fit began developing its fitness-equipment business in 2021. It later added categories including footwear and massage equipment. Its first exclusive brand outlet opened in 2023, and by 2024 the company reportedly operated 29 such outlets.

== Financial performance and IPO ==
Cult.fit reported revenue from operations of ₹1,720.61 crore for FY2026. Fitness services accounted for about 70% of revenue and fitness products for the remaining 30%. Revenue from fitness services remained concentrated in Delhi-NCR, Mumbai, Bengaluru and Hyderabad, which together accounted for more than 90% of that segment's revenue in FY2026.

In July 2026, Cult.fit filed a draft red herring prospectus with the Securities and Exchange Board of India. The proposed offering comprised a fresh issue of shares of up to ₹950 crore and an offer for sale by existing shareholders.
