= Myntra Fashion Superstar =

Indian Reality TV Competition

- Genre: Reality competition
- Judges: Sushmita Sen; Mallika Dua; Manish Malhotra; Sonakshi Sinha; Shaleena Nathani
- Country of origin: India
- Original languages: English, Hindi
- No. of seasons: 3
- No. of episodes: 20

Production
- Camera setup: Akshay Rajput Nitesh choudhary Multiple
- Running time: 45–60 minutes
- Production company: Banijay Asia

Original release
- Network: Zoom (2019); MTV India (2020); Voot (2021)
- Release: September 17, 2019 – present

Myntra launched its first digital reality show "Myntra Fashion Superstar" which is based on the fashion influencer talent hunt on Myntra app on 17 September 2019. In association with Zoom Studios, this show will identify & reward India's next big fashion influencer. Show has eight episodes of reality series which will see 10 contenders competing with each other. They would also be mentored and judged by a star studded jury, from the world of Bollywood, TV and fashion, including Bollywood diva Sonakshi Sinha and leading celebrity stylist, Shaleena Nathani.

The show has been renewed for its second season in association with MTV India and Voot, with Manish Malhotra as the new host.

== Judges and host ==
Judge/Host	Season		
Judge/Host	1	2	3
Judging Panellists
Sonakshi Sinha	Main		
Shaleena Nathani	Main		
Manish Malhotra	Guest	Main	Main
Sushmita Sen		Main	
Mallika Dua	Guest	Main	
Kusha Kapila	Guest		Main
Ankush Bahuguna			Main
Santu Misra			Main
Aashna Shroff			Main
Host
Ayush Mehra	Main		
Gaelyn Mendonca		Main	
Lity (Virtual Assistant)			Main

== Series Details ==
Season	Network	Premiere date	Final Date	Winner	Runner-up	Winners' Prizes	People'sChoice Award	People's Choice Award Prizes
1	Zoom	17 September 2019	4 November 2019	Tanumita Ghosh	Deepen Sharma	Signed up as a Myntra Influencer for 1 million rupees; Host their own fashion and lifestyle show on Zoom; Be featured in a top fashion magazine; Customised Workshops from Facebook & Instagram	Sumedha Sharma	Signed up as a Myntra Influencer for 1 million rupees
2	MTV India	1 November 2020	13 December 2020	Edwin Kubzar	Mark Mascarenhas (Tropical Marca)	1 year influencer contract with Myntra worth 1 million rupees; 1 year contract with MTV as a fashion influencer	none	
3	Myntra Studio & Voot	11 November 2021	18 November 2021	Nirjal Basnet (Queen Andro)	Ankit Vaid	5 million rupees worth contract with Myntra Studio	none	

== Season 1 ==
=== Influencer Contestants ===
Contestant	Age	Home Town	Occupation	Finish	Result
Tanumita Ghosh	27	Kolkata	Celebrity stylist	Episode 8	Winner
Deepen Sharma	26	Mumbai	Fashion Artist	Episode 8	Runner-up
Sumedha Sharma	23	New Delhi	Student, Fashion blogger	Episode 8	3rd place
Jatin Jaluthria	34	Delhi	Fashion blogger	Episode 7	Eliminated
Ishita Khanna	25	Madhya Pradesh	Fashion & Lifestyle Blogger	Episode 6	Eliminated
Mayur Saroj Rajput	28	Bhopal	Designer, entrepreneur, professor	Episode 5	Eliminated
Vishakha Rajani	22	Bhopal	Fashion blogger, Digital Marketer	Episode 4	Eliminated
Prince Verma	29	Ludhiana	Actor	Episode 3	Eliminated
Aanchal Aware	21	Nagpur	Model/Blogger	Episode 2	Eliminated
Akshay Sharma	23	Delhi	Senior Executive Stylist	Episode 1	Eliminated

=== Summary ===
Contestant	Episode 1	Episode 2	Episode 3	Episode 4	Episode 5	Episode 6	Episode 7	Episode 8	
Contestant	#Follow	#SuperLike	#BeWoke	#GoViral	#AreYouReady	#FashionBeyondMe	#NoFilter	#ThePitch	
Tanumita	HIGH	HIGH	WIN	BTM2	HIGH	HIGH	HIGH	53%	Winner
Deepen	HIGH	HIGH	WIN	HIGH	SAFE	HIGH	HIGH	25%	Runner-up
Sumedha	HIGH	HIGH	SAFE	WIN	HIGH	HIGH	BTM2	22%	MFSPCA
Jatin	HIGH	HIGH	BTM2	SAFE	BTM2	BTM2	ELIM		
Ishita	HIGH	SAFE	HIGH	HIGH	WIN	ELIM			
Mayur	SAFE	HIGH	SAFE	SAFE	ELIM				
Vishakha	HIGH	BTM2	HIGH	ELIM					
Prince	BTM2	HIGH	ELIM						
Aanchal	SAFE	ELIM							
Akshay	ELIM								

The contestant won Myntra Fashion Superstar.
The contestant was the runner-up.
The contestants were eliminated during the final round by the votes of the Myntra Insiders.
The contestant was voted Myntra Fashion Superstar People's Choice Award by viewers.
The contestant won the challenge and received a heart from Sonakshi Sinha.
The contestant received positive judges' critiques and received a heart from Sonakshi Sinha.
The contestant received negative judges' critiques and was saved by Guest Judge.
The contestant was in the bottom 2.
The contestant was eliminated.

== Season 2 ==
The entries for season 2 was announced on 15 August 2020 on MTV India and Twitter handle of Myntra Fashion Superstar. The entries were open on the Myntra App and Voot.

=== Influencer Contestants ===
Contestant	Age	Home Town	Social media Handle	Finish	Result
Edwin Kubzar	25	Nagaland	@edwinkubzar	Episode 8	Winner
Mark Mascarenhas; Tropical Marca	28	Mumbai	@TropicalMarca	Episode 8	Runner-up
Mridul Madhok	24	Delhi	@mridulmadhok	Episode 8	3rd place
Asmita Kaushik	23	Delhi	@asmita.kaushik	Episode 7	Eliminated
Param Sahib	29	Delhi	@Parambanana	Episode 6	Eliminated
Tanitha Pereira	24	Chennai	@tanitha_pereira	Episode 5	Quit
Neelakshi Singh	29	Mumbai	@PlumpToPretty	Episode 5	Quit
Srishti Nadhani	28	Kolkata	@outlanSrish	Episode 4	Eliminated
Huma Joad	22	Pune	@WRAPMYHIJAB	Episode 3	Eliminated
Pavithra Balakrishnan	28	Chennai	@makeupmartini	Episode 2	Eliminated
Divyanshi Tripathi	23	Lucknow	@divyanshitripathii	Episode 1	Eliminated
Janak Valecha	18	Mumbai	@jiggyjacob_	Episode 1	Eliminated
Rahul Raina	29	Chennai	@stylewise007	Episode 1	Eliminated
Rose Kawatra	20	Delhi	@rosekawatra	Episode 1	Eliminated
Dimple Mehta	28	Mumbai	@inforstyle	Episode 1	Eliminated
Shakshi Shetty	23	Mumbai	@sharkshee	Episode 1	Eliminated
Simran Mittal	19	Mumbai	@simran__mittal	Episode 1	Eliminated
Shivani Pathak	23	Mumbai	@thatphatchica	Episode 1	Eliminated

=== Summary ===
Contestant	Episode 1		Episode 2	Episode 3	Episode 4	Episode 5	Episode 6	Episode 7	Episode 8
Contestant	Follow^{1}	BRB List	Speak your Mind	Collabs^{2}	Vibe with your Tribe	Quarantine Fashion^{3}	Trolls	H&M Fashion	Grand Finale
Edwin	ADV		LOW	LOW	SAFE	SAFE	BTM2	WIN	Winner
Mark/Marca	ADV		SAFE	BTM2	SAFE	BTM2	SAFE	SAFE	Runner-up
Mridul	ADV		SAFE	WIN	WIN	SAFE	HIGH	BTM2	Eliminated
Asmita	ADV		SAFE	HIGH	BTM3	BTM2	WIN	ELIM	
Param	ADV		WIN	LOW	SAFE	WIN	ELIM		
Tanitha	ADV		SAFE	WIN	BTM3	QUIT			
Neelakshi	ADV		SAFE	HIGH	SAFE	QUIT			
Srishti	BRB	ADV	BTM2	HIGH	ELIM				
Huma	ADV		SAFE	ELIM					
Pavithra	BRB	ADV	ELIM						
Divyanshi	BRB	ELIM							
Janak	BRB	ELIM							
Rahul	BRB	ELIM							
Rose	BRB	ELIM							
Dimple	ELIM								
Shakshi	ELIM								
Simran	ELIM								
Shivani	ELIM								

The contestant won Myntra Fashion Superstar.
The contestant was the runner-up.
The contestants were eliminated during the Grand Finale.
The contestant advanced by receiving Follows from the judges in Episode 1.
The contestant won the challenge.
The contestant received positive judges' critiques.
The contestant was save.
The contestant received negative judges' critiques.
The contestant was in the bottom 2.
The contestant was eliminated.
The contestant quit the competition

==== Notes ====
- ^1 – Contestants had a one-on-one with the 3 Judges, where the judges will decide if they would follow them. If they received 3 follows, they directly advanced Top 10. If received 2 or less than 2 follows, they will go to BRB list where the Judges will later choose to advance a few from BRB list.
- ^2 – Contestants had to compete in teams. Teams were: Mark & Huma; Edwin & Param; Mridul & Tanitha; Asmita, Neelakshi & Srishti.
- ^3 – Neelakshi and Tanitha decided to quit the show, due to health reasons. Sushmita Sen was unwell and joined the panel virtually. This episode was a non-elimination bottom two.

== Season 3 ==
This season exclusively streamed on OTT platforms – Myntra App and Voot.

=== Influencer Contestants ===
Contestant	Home Town	Social media Handle	Finish	Result
Nirjal Basnet; Queen Andro	Darjeeling, West Bengal	@queenandro_	Episode 8	Winner
Ankit Vaid	Chandigarh	@ankitvaidofficial	Episode 8	Runner-up
Priyam Yonzon	Darjeeling, West Bengal	@priyamyonzon	Episode 8	3rd place
Devansh Kamboj	Delhi	@devanshkamboj	Episode 7	Eliminated
Cipia Artul	Delhi	@cipiaartul	Episode 6	Eliminated
Ziean	Itanagar, Arunachal Pradesh	@ziean0	Episode 6	Eliminated
Tanya Gupta	Orai, Uttar Pradesh	@tanyagupta.official	Episode 4	Eliminated
Jinal Jain	Mumbai, Maharashtra	@lampofjinni	Episode 4	Eliminated
Samidha Singh	Mumbai, Maharashtra	@samidhasinghh	Episode 4	Eliminated
Shrawan Chhetri	Binnaguri, West Bengal	@mencrucials	Episode 2	Eliminated
Yukti Chugh	Indore	@yuktiichugh	Episode 2	Eliminated
Adlina Angelo	Mumbai, Maharashtra	@adlinaangelo	Episode 2	Eliminated

=== Summary ===
Contestant	Episode 1	Episode 2	LIKEBOARD^{[1]}	Episode 3	Episode 4	LIKEBOARD^{[3]}	Episode 5	Episode 6	LIKEBOARD^{[5]}	Cumulative LIKEBOARD^{[5]}	Episode 7 ^{[6]}		LIKEBOARD^{[7]}	Episode 8 ^{[6]} Finale		Final LIKEBOARD^{[8]}	Result	Total Cumulative LIKEBOARD
Contestant	Dress how you want to be addressed	Be kind to your mind	LIKEBOARD^{[1]}	Tell your story before you sell it ^{[2]}	Slay it on a Budget of 5000 rupees	LIKEBOARD^{[3]}	Fashion marries humor + Collab for Collab ^{[4]}	Leisure for Athleisure Content for PUMA	LIKEBOARD^{[5]}	Cumulative LIKEBOARD^{[5]}	Listen to the Noise within ^{[2]}	Take less & give more ^{[2]}	LIKEBOARD^{[7]}	MLIVE selling 3 products	I Wear MyStory	Final LIKEBOARD^{[8]}	Result	Total Cumulative LIKEBOARD
Nirjal Queen Andro	5 Likes	5 Likes + M Like	11 Likes	5 Likes	5 Likes + M Like	11 Likes	5 Likes	5 Likes	10 Likes	32 Likes	3 Likes	5 Likes	8 Likes	5 Likes	5 Likes + M Like	19 Likes	Winner	51 Likes
Ankit	4 Likes	0 Likes	4 Likes	2 Likes	3 Likes	5 Likes	5 Likes	5 Likes + M Like	11 Likes	19 Likes	2 Likes	5 Likes	7 Likes	5 Likes	5 Likes	17 Likes	Runner-up	36 Likes
Priyam	5 Likes + M Like	5 Likes	11 Likes	3 Likes	5 Likes	8 Likes	5 Likes	5 Likes + M Like	11 Likes	30 Likes	5 Likes	2 Likes	7 Likes	3 Likes	5 Likes	15 Likes	Eliminated	45 Likes
Devansh	5 Likes	2 Likes	7 Likes	5 Likes	5 Likes	10 Likes	4 Likes + M Like	5 Likes	10 Likes	28 Likes	2 Likes	4 Likes	6 Likes	UNFOLLOWED				32 Likes
Cipia	2 Likes	5 Likes	7 Likes	4 Likes	3 Likes	7 Likes	4 Likes + M Like	5 Likes	10 Likes	25 Likes	UNFOLLOWED							25 Likes
Ziean	3 Likes	2 Likes	5 Likes	5 Likes	2 Likes	7 Likes	5 Likes	5 Likes	10 Likes	22 Likes	UNFOLLOWED							22 Likes
Tanya	3 Likes	3 Likes	6 Likes	0 Likes	5 Likes	5 Likes	UNFOLLOWED											11 Likes
Jinal	4 Likes	5 Likes + M Like	10 Likes	3 Likes	1 Like	4 Likes	UNFOLLOWED											14 Likes
Samidha	4 Likes	2 Likes	6 Likes	1 Like	1 Like	2 Likes	UNFOLLOWED											8 Likes
Shrawan	3 Likes	0 Likes	3 Likes	UNFOLLOWED														3 Likes
Yukti	2 Likes	0 Likes	2 Likes	UNFOLLOWED														2 Likes
Adlina	1 Like	0 Likes	1 Like	UNFOLLOWED														1 Like

The contestant won Myntra Fashion Superstar.
The contestant was the runner-up.
The contestants were eliminated during the Grand Finale.
The contestant received the M Like but wasn't the top performer in the challenge.
The contestant received the M Like and won the challenge.
The contestant received positive judges' critiques.
The contestant was save.
The contestant received negative judges' critiques.
The contestant was in the bottom.
The contestant was eliminated.
The contestant quit the competition

==== Notes ====
- ^1 – Based on the Likes received in Episode 1 and 2, the bottom 3 influencers on the LIKEBOARD were eliminated.
- ^2 – Nobody received a M Like in this Episode.
- ^3 – Based on the Likes received in Episode 3 and 4, the bottom 3 influencers on the LIKEBOARD were eliminated. Ankit & Tanya were tied with 5 points, the judges had to decide to unfollow one.
- ^4 – Contestants had to compete in pairs: Queen & Ankit; Cipia & Devansh; Priyam & Ziean.
- ^5 – Based on the Likes received in Episode 5 and 6, the bottom 3 influencers on the LIKEBOARD were supposed to be eliminated. Queen, Devansh, Cipia & Ziean were tied with 10 points, the judges decided to make it Top 4 based on cumulative LIKEBOARD from Episode 1 to 6.
- ^6 – In this Episode, the influencers had to make two different posts with different content briefs.
- ^7 – Based on the Likes received on 2 posts in Episode 7, the influencer with the least likes on the LIKEBOARD was eliminated.
- ^8 – Based on the Final cumulative LIKEBOARD, Likes received in Episode 7 and 8 (4 posts), the final result were declared.

== Guests ==
Season	Episode	Guest(s)	
1	1	Dino Morea	Cyrus Sahukar
1	2	Cyrus Broacha	
1	3	Kusha Kapila	
1	4	Mallika Dua	Priyank Sharma
1	5	Sapna Pabbi	Srishti Dixit
1	6	Mithila Palkar	Daniel Bauer
1	7	Komal Pandey	Bani J
1	8	Manish Malhotra	
