= Gaelyn Mendonca =

Indian actress

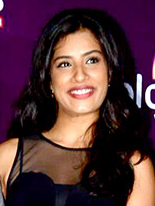
- Gaelyn Mendonca (2015)
- Born: Bombay, Maharashtra, India
- Education: St. Xavier's College, Mumbai (BSc)
- Occupations: Actress; model; VJ
- Years active: 2013; 2016–present
- Spouse: Sheehan Furtado (m. 2017)
- Modeling information
- Hair color: Black
- Eye color: Brown

Gaelyn Mendonca is an Indian actress,model and VJ for MTV India. She is best known for hosting WWE Now India and MTV Hustle.

== Early life and education ==
Gaelyn Mendonca was born in Bombay, and grew up in Orlem. She graduated from Carmel of St. Joseph School, and later studied economics and sociology at St. Xavier's College. For five consecutive years, she won street dance competitions at Malhar.

== Career ==
Mendonca began her career as a model while attending St Xavier's College. She has walked for numerous brands, including Lakme Fashion Week. After graduating from college, she began her broadcasting career as an anchor with Good Times on the program Cool Quotient.

In 2013, Mendonca won the MTV VJ Hunt alongside Sunanda Wong. In the same year, she made her Bollywood debut in Rohan Sippy's Nautanki Saala! As a VJ, she has hosted several programs and covered the 2011 Cricket World Cup. In 2016, She began hosting MTV Roadies and the reality rap program MTV Hustle.

In 2019, Mendonca was signed to WWE as a host for WWE Now India, which covers wrestling news for viewers in India.

== Filmography ==
=== Film ===
Year	Film	Role	Notes
2013	Nautanki Saala	Chitra Singh	Hindi film debut

=== Television ===
Year	Show	Role
2016	MTV Roadies X4: Your Gang, Your Glory	Host
2016	LinkedIn MTV Get A Job	Host
2017	MTV Roadies Rising	Host
2019	MTV Hustle	Host
2019	WWE Now India	Host
2020	Myntra Fashion Superstar	Host

== Personal life ==
On 29 December 2017, Mendonca married her longtime boyfriend Sheehan Furtado. On 22 Jan she gave birth to a girl. The announcement was made on her Instagram account.
