= Myntra =

Indian fashion & lifestyle products company

- Myntra Website screenshot
- Website type: E-Commerce
- Available in: English
- Founded: 2007; 19 years ago
- Area served: India
- Founders: Mukesh Bansal, Vineet Saxena, Ashutosh Lawania
- CEO: Sharon Pais
- Parent: Flipkart
- Subsidiaries: Fitiquette, Roadster
- Website: www.myntra.com
- Commercial: Yes
- Registration: Required
- Current status: Active

Myntra is an Indian fashion e-commerce company, headquartered in Bengaluru. The company was founded in 2007 to sell personalized gift items. In May 2014, Myntra.com was acquired by Flipkart.

== History ==
Established by Mukesh Bansal along with Ashutosh Lawania and Vineet Saxena, Myntra sold on-demand personalized gift items in a business-to-business (B2B) model during its initial years. Between 2007 and 2010, the site allowed customers to personalize products such as T-shirts, mugs, mouse pads, and others.

In 2011, Myntra began selling fashion and lifestyle products and moved away from personalisation. By 2012, Myntra offered products from 350 Indian and international brands. The website launched the brands Fastrack Watches and Being Human.

In 2014, Myntra was acquired by Flipkart in a deal valued at ₹2,000 crore (US$327.71 million). The purchase was influenced by two large common shareholders Tiger Global and Accel Partners. Myntra continued to operate independently as a standalone brand under Flipkart's ownership, focusing primarily on fashion.

In 2014, Myntra's portfolio included about 1,50,000 products of over 1,000 brands, with a distribution area of around 9,000 pincodes in India. In 2015, Ananth Narayanan became the chief executive officer of Myntra.

On 10 May 2015, Myntra announced that it would shut down its website, and serve customers exclusively through its mobile app beginning 15 May. The service had already discontinued its mobile website in favour of the app. Myntra justified its decision by stating that 95% of traffic on its website came via mobile devices, and that 70% of its purchases were performed on smartphones. The move received mixed reception, and resulted in a 10% decline in sales. In February 2016, acknowledging the failure of the "app-only" model, Myntra announced that it would revive its website.

In September 2017, Myntra negotiated the rights to manage Esprit Holdings's 15 offline stores in India. Myntra reported a net loss of ₹151.20 crore in the financial year 2017–2018.

In January 2021, Myntra changed its logo, after an activist named Naaz Patel filed a police complaint alleging the logo was "offensive" to women.

== Acquisitions and investments ==
In October 2007, Myntra received its initial funding from Erasmic Venture Fund (now known as Accel Partners), Sasha Mirchandani from Mumbai Angels and a few other investors. In November 2008, Myntra raised almost $5 million from NEA-IndoUS Ventures, IDG Ventures and Accel Partners. Myntra raised $14 million in a Series B round of funding. This round of investment was led by Tiger Global, a private equity firm; the existing investors IDG Ventures and Indo-US Venture Partners also put in a substantial amount towards funding Myntra. Towards the end of 2011, Myntra.com raised $20 million in its third round of funding, again led by Tiger Global. In February 2014, Myntra raised an additional $50 million (₹310 crore) in funding from Premji Invest and a few other private investors.

In April 2015, Myntra acquired Bengaluru-based mobile app development platform company Native5, with a view to strengthen and expand Myntra's mobile technology team.

In July 2016, Myntra acquired mobile-based content aggregation platform Cubeit, to strengthen and expand its technology team.

In July 2016, Myntra acquired their rival Jabong.com to become India's largest fashion platform. In October 2017, Myntra partnered with the Ministry of Textiles to promote the handloom industry.

In April 2017, the company acquired InLogg, a city-based technology platform for the e-commerce sector.

In April 2018, Myntra acquired Bengaluru-based start-up Witworks, a maker of wearable devices, to strengthen its technology team.

In August 2018, Myntra acquired Mumbai-based start-up Pretr Online Services Pvt. Ltd., an end-to-end omnichannel platform for retail.

== Digital Reality Show (fashion influencer) ==
Myntra launched its first digital reality-based show, "Myntra Fashion Superstar", which is based on the fashion influencer talent hunt on the Myntra app, on 17 September 2019. In association with Zoom Studios, this show will identify and reward India's next big fashion influencer. The show has eight episodes, which will see 10 contenders competing with each other. They would also be mentored and judged by a star-studded jury, from the world of Bollywood, TV and fashion, including Bollywood actor Sonakshi Sinha and stylist Shaleena Nathani.

== Regulatory action and lawsuits ==
The Enforcement Directorate is investigating Myntra for a breach of the Foreign Exchange Management Act, 1999.

In January 2016, the Enforcement Directorate issued a notice to Myntra's owner Flipkart. It has a tie-up with Nike through the dealer Funfash to sell all authentic Nike accessories.

== Labour issues ==
In June 2016, Myntra's logistics staff went on a strike alleging a lack of basic employee benefits and poor wages.

== See also ==
- E-commerce in India
- Online shopping
- Flipkart
