= Mukesh Bansal =

Indian businessman and podcaster

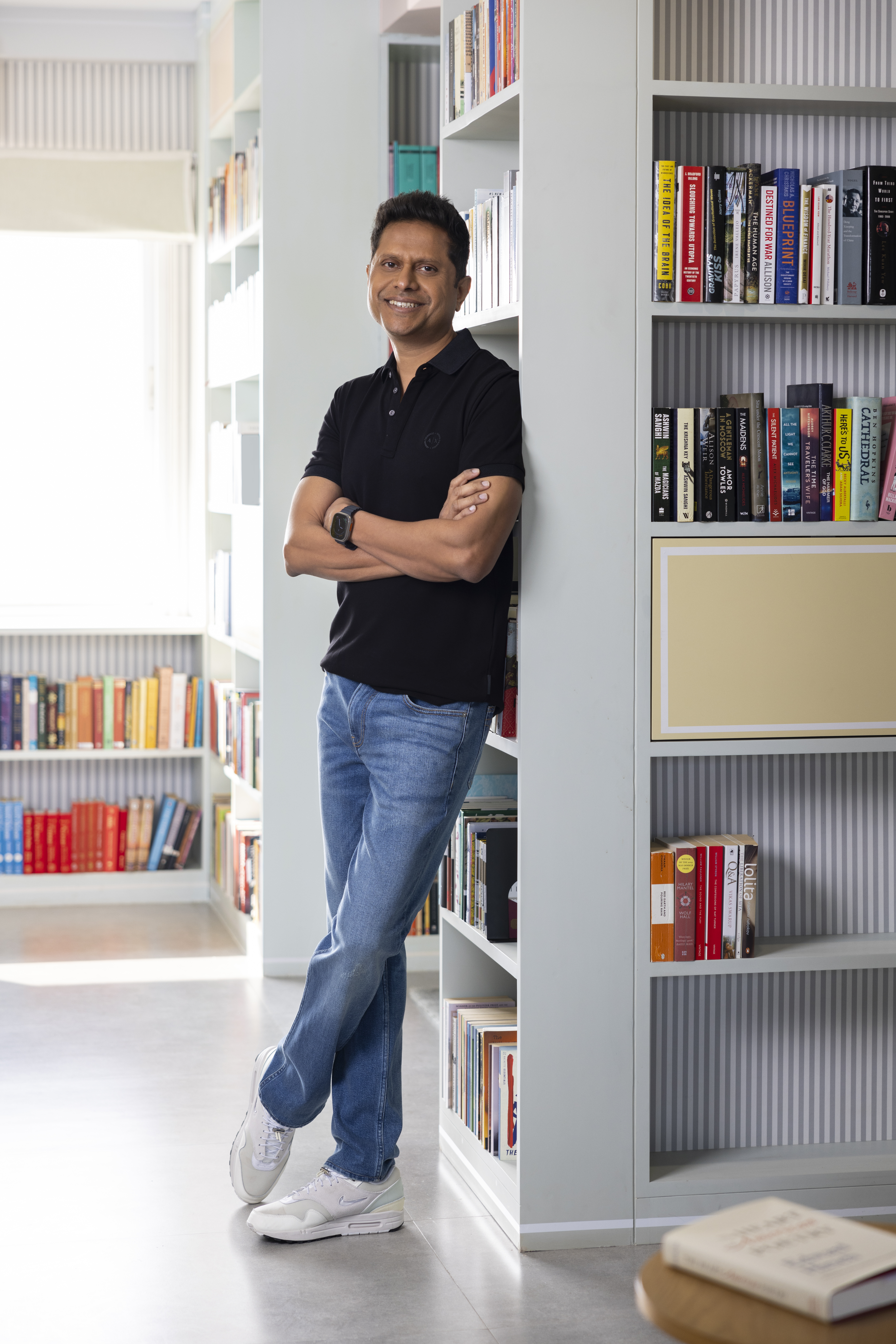
- Mukesh Bansal in 2023.
- Education: Bachelor of Technology
- Alma mater: IIT Kanpur
- Occupation: Entrepreneur
- Known for: Myntra Flipkart https://www.Cult.fit

Mukesh Bansal (born September, 1975) is an Indian entrepreneur and podcaster known for his contributions to the e-commerce, health-tech, and startup ecosystems. He is the co-founder of Myntra, Cult.Fit, and Meraki Labs, and has played a significant role in shaping India's tech and entrepreneurial landscape. Mukesh has been listed in the Best 40 under 40 Entrepreneurs by Fortune Magazine.

== Early life and education ==
Bansal was born in Haridwar, India. He completed his early education in Haridwar before pursuing a degree in Computer Science and Engineering at IIT Kanpur. His early interest in technology and entrepreneurship guided his career path in the tech industry.

== Career ==
=== Early career ===
After graduating from IIT Kanpur, Bansal began his career as a system analyst with Deloitte in Chicago. He later worked with several startups in Silicon Valley, including NexTag, Centrata, and NewScale. These roles provided him with substantial experience and insights, which he later applied to his ventures in India.

=== Myntra ===
In 2007, Bansal co-founded Myntra with Ashutosh Lawania and Vineet Saxena. Initially, Myntra specialised in personalised gift items but shifted focus to fashion and lifestyle products. Under Bansal's leadership, Myntra became a leading fashion e-commerce platform in India. In 2014, Myntra was acquired by Flipkart in a transaction valued at approximately $330 million. Following the acquisition, Bansal took on the role of Head of Commerce and Advertising Business at Flipkart.

=== Cure.Fit ===
Cure.Fit was founded in 2016 by Mukesh Bansal and Ankit Nagori with the goal of offering a comprehensive approach to health and fitness. The company provides services across multiple areas including fitness, nutrition, and mental well-being.

Cure.Fit has developed several distinct services:

- Cult.fit: A chain of fitness centres offering various workout programs.
- Eat.fit: A service focused on delivering healthy meals.
- Mind.fit: Provides yoga and meditation sessions.
- Care.fit: Offers primary healthcare services.

The company has attracted significant investment and has expanded its operations across India. Its business model integrates different aspects of health and wellness.

=== Meraki Labs ===
Meraki Labs, co-founded by Mukesh Bansal in 2020, is described as India's first startup studio. The organisation focuses on supporting the development of new companies by providing initial funding and a founding team. It collaborates with founders to build startups from the ground up and offers initial funding ranging from $250K to $5M.

Operating as a venture studio, Meraki Labs works closely with founders to identify market needs and develop new products. The studio has supported startups including Skyroot, Groww, Nextleap, Nushala, and Gigforce.

In addition to financial support, Meraki Labs provides access to experienced entrepreneurs, leadership coaches, and a structured curriculum covering product development, branding, and fundraising. The studio also fosters a community of over 100 founders who share insights and support each other.

Meraki Labs has received backing from investors such as Peak XV Partners (formerly Sequoia India) and Accel. The organisation is positioned within the Indian startup ecosystem as a platform for developing innovative ideas and nurturing emerging companies.

=== Podcast ===
Bansal hosts the podcast "SparX," which explores "Big Ideas" across various fields, including economics, politics, science, and entrepreneurship. The podcast features individual episodes where Bansal shares insights from his career and guest episodes with influential figures such as Ajeet Singh, Sudha Murty and Rahul Dravid.

=== Olympics Gold Quest ===
Mukesh is also on the board of Olympics Gold Quest, a non-profit foundation that promotes efforts to support Indian athletes in winning Olympic Gold medals.

== Books ==
- Hacking Health: The Only Book You’ll Ever Need To Live a Healthier Life (2023)
- No Limits: The Art and Science of High Performance (2020)

== Achievements and Recognition ==
Bansal has been recognized for his contributions to the industry:

- Fortune India 40 Under 40: Featured in Fortune India’s list of 40 Under 40.
- Business Today’s Coolest Start-ups: Myntra was named one of Business Today’s Coolest Start-ups under his leadership.
- IIT Kanpur Distinguished Alumnus Award (2021): Honoured with this award by IIT Kanpur.
