= Great Online Shopping Festival =

Online shopping event by Google India

The Great Online Shopping Festival (GOSF) was an online shopping event created by Google India on 12 December 2012 in collaboration with a number of Indian online shopping portals. The concept of the GOSF was that the online shopping sites would give heavy discounts for one day, in order to promote their sales. In November 2015, Google announced that the event would not be repeated.

== History ==
The concept of a one-day online sale originated in the United States, where many online shopping sites offer discounts on "Cyber Monday", the first Monday after the so-called Black Friday, the day that follows the U.S. Thanksgiving. Cyber Monday started in 2005 and the concept has spread to several countries including Canada, Japan, Australia, Colombia, and the U.K.. In China a similar day of online shopping is observed on November 11, which is known as "Singles Day". Another same type of event started in 2012 in Australia named Click Frenzy.

The first Great Online Shopping Festival in 2012 was advertised on YouTube and via posts on Google Plus. For the event, Google partnered with a number of ecommerce sites such as Flipkart, HomeShop18, Snapdeal, Indiatimes shopping, Infibeam and Makemytrip, which would participate in the GOSF. The ecommerce sites created dedicated landing pages for GOSF. GOSF site engaged users through games and showing offers and eventually it redirected users to the dedicated landing pages of ecommerce sites to do the transactions.

According to critics, the first GOSF left some consumers a little disappointed as the discounts were marginal or nonexistent.

In 2013, the Great Online Shopping Festival was held on 11–14 December. Participating companies included Myntra, Jabong.com, and Indiatimes Shopping. Google claimed that the shopping festival was a success for the companies, and extended the event, which was planned to end on 13 December, by one day.

In December 2014, the GOSF took place on 10–12 December, and involved over 450 online retailers. 2014 GOSF included several categories such as lifestyle, electronics, books and media, home and kitchen, groceries, mobile apps, automobiles, and real estate. Discounts were also given on career services, health care and insurance policies, travel packages and matrimonial plans. Several brands also launched new products at the GOSF.

== See also ==
- Cyber Monday
- Singles Day
