= E-commerce in India =

The size of the e-commerce market in India was estimated at US$147.3 billion in 2024, with an 18.7 percent predicted compound annual growth rate (CAGR) through 2028. This growth is driven by technological innovations, cheaper data rates, and rising smartphone adoption, along with increased market penetration in Tier II and Tier III cities. By 2027, the number of Indian e-commerce consumers is projected to be 400 million, up from 312.5 million in 2022.

India had an Internet user base of about 690 million in 2023, about 40 percent of the population. Despite India's being the second-largest user base in the world, behind only China (1.079 billion, 48 percent of population), its penetration of e-commerce is comparatively lower. However, an estimated 6 million new users were being added monthly in 2014.

In India, cash on delivery is the most preferred payment method, accumulating 75 percent of e-retail activities. Demand for international consumer products (including long-tail items) is growing faster than in-country supply from authorised distributors and e-commerce offerings. Long-tail (a term first coined in 2004 by Chris Anderson) business strategy allows companies to realise significant profits by selling low volumes of hard-to-find items to many customers, instead of selling only large volumes of a reduced number of popular items.

== Market size and growth ==
India's e-commerce market was worth about US$3.9 billion in 2009. As per "India Goes Digital", a report by Avendus Capital, the Indian e-commerce market was estimated at ₹28,500 crore (US$6.3 billion) for the year 2011. Online travel constitutes a sizeable portion (87 percent) of this market today. The online travel market in India had a growth rate of 22 percent over the next four years and reached ₹54,800 crore (US$12.2 billion) in size by 2015. The Indian e-tailing industry was estimated at ₹3,600 crore (US$800 million) in 2011 and was estimated to grow to ₹53,000 crore (US$11.8 billion) in 2015. In 2013, the market went up to US$12.6 billion, and the e-retail segment was worth US$2.3 billion. About 79 percent of India's e-commerce market was travel-related in 2013. According to Google India, there were 35 million online shoppers in India in the first quarter of 2014, a figure expected to cross the 100-million mark by the end of 2016.

Compound annual growth rate vis-à-vis a global growth rate of 8 to 10 percent. Electronics and apparel are the biggest sales categories. Overall, the e-commerce market reached ₹1,07,800 crore (US$24 billion) by the year 2015, with both online travel and e-tailing contributing equally. Another big segment in e-commerce is mobile/direct-to-home recharge, with nearly a million transactions daily by operator websites. The year 2016 also saw an increase in online sales of luxury products, such as jewellery. Most of the retail brands had also started entering the market, and expected at least 20 percent sales to be online in the next two to three years. According to Google India Research in 2016, by 2021 India was expected to generate US$100 billion online retail revenue, out of which US$35 billion would be through fashion e-commerce.

The e-commerce industry was reported at US$24 billion in 2017, recognised as the fastest-growing industry in India. The e-commerce market grew to US$38.5 billion in 2018. As of 2020, it was estimated that one in every three Indian shopped via smartphone, and online retailers delivered to 20,000 pin codes out of the 100,000 in India. As per Goldman Sachs, India's e-commerce industry would reach US$99 billion in size, and online retail was expected to more than double to around 11 percent by 2024 from 4.7 percent in 2019, increasing at a 27 percent compound annual growth rate, and the online grocery segment below US$2 billion would reach US$29 billion in size by 2024. Online grocery orders was expected to grow from 3 million per day in 2019 to more than 5 million per day by 2024. Non-grocery e-commerce penetration was expected to be 16.1 percent by 2021.

As per property consultant Colliers International, the demand for warehousing of 5,000 to 10,000 square feet (square metres) in size would increase due to COVID-19 lockdowns, leading to a surge in online orders of essential items for same-day delivery, especially in Tier I cities like Mumbai, Kolkata, Bengaluru, Chennai, and New Delhi. Flipkart debuted a hyperlocal service called Flipkart Quick in Bengaluru to start 90-minute deliveries. Amazon observed a spike in page views with a four-times increase in "Add to Cart" during the lockdown, leading to a doubling of sales. It also started selling auto insurance in partnership with Acko General Insurance, available to users through Amazon's app and mobile website. With the opening of 10 new warehouses, the count of Amazon warehouses in India would stand at 60 across 15 states, an area equivalent to more than 100 football fields.

Report from software as a service (SaaS) provider Unicommerce in 2020 showed increasing penetration of e-commerce beyond Tier I cities, with major growth coming from Tier II and Tier III towns/villages due to increasing vernacular language content and improving last-mile delivery. Consumers were also diversifying their purchasing options from large-scale e-commerce channels like Amazon or Flipkart to specific retail brand websites. As per Goldman Sachs, three or four players could co-exist in the e-commerce space, given the size of India; but travel, food delivery, and ride-hailing services would see a maximum of two players capturing the market. Reliance Jio was expected to increase competition in grocery, fintech, online retail, and food delivery. In 2018, Amazon was India's largest e-commerce company by revenue.

From February 2020 to June 2020 during the COVID-19 lock-down period, e-commerce increased by 117 percent with the delivery of only essential supplies that is now bigger than the pre-COVID-19 level. Flipkart surpassed 1.5 billion visits per month, with a 45 percent growth in monthly active user and a 30 percent growth in transactions per consumer. Tier III markets were showing 53 percent year on year growth with higher Internet penetration and connectivity. Kinetic Green started selling electric auto rickshaws and golf carts online mainly in the eastern and northern parts of India with a revenue of ₹75 crore in 2019, standing at ₹100 crore as of August 2020. E-commerce helped Nestlé increase sales at a rate of 122 percent, which contributed to 3.6 percent of overall sales during the second quarter of 2020–21. Apple Inc. opened an online channel to sell products in India for the first time in August 2020 to target the festival seasons.

In 2020, Flipkart outsold Amazon by almost two to one by sales during festive retail season. In 2023, the largest e-commerce companies in India were Flipkart, Snapdeal, and Amazon. In 2026, Bloomberg reported that Amazon under Andy Jassy was scaling down the scope of its ambitions, after failed acquisitions and regulatory hurdles.

== Closures ==
Though the sector has witnessed tremendous growth and is expected to grow, many e-commerce ventures have faced tremendous pressure to ensure cash flows. But it has not worked out for all the e-commerce websites. Many—like Dhingana, IndiaPlaza.in, eBay-India, Rock.in, and Seventy MM, amongst others—had to close down or change their business models to survive. In March 2020, the Government of India restricted online sales of all goods except for critical items, including food, pharmaceuticals, and medical equipment. Many Indian startups including Urban Company, BookMyShow, Pepperfry, and Nykaa, which did not feature in the government's list of notified essential services, were running at a loss due to the COVID-19 pandemic.

== Infrastructure ==
There are many hosting companies working in India, some of which offer SaaS for hosting web stores. India has its own version of Cyber Monday, known as the Great Online Shopping Festival, which started in December 2012 when Google India partnered with e-commerce companies including Flipkart, HomeShop18, Snapdeal, Indiatimes shopping, and MakeMyTrip. "Cyber Monday" is a term coined in the United States for the Monday after Black Friday, the next day after Thanksgiving Day.

In early June 2013, Amazon.com launched its Amazon India marketplace without any marketing campaigns. In July 2014, Amazon had said it would invest US$2 billion (₹12,000 crore) in India to expand the business, after its largest Indian rival, Flipkart, announced US$1 billion in funding. In June 2016, Amazon agreed to invest another US$3 billion to further pressure rivals Flipkart and Snapdeal Amazon also entered the grocery segment with its convenience store in Bangalore and was also planning to enter in various other cities like Delhi, Mumbai, and Chennai but faced stiff competition with Indian startups. A large proportion of traffic towards e-commerce sites became driven by coupon sites.

In 2022, the pilot phase of the Open Network for Digital Commerce was launched.

== Funding ==
Among the examples of venture capital firms that have invested in e-commerce companies in India are these:

- Flipkart.com raised about US$2.3 billion in 2014. On 10 July 2013, Flipkart announced it had received US$ 200 million from existing investors Tiger Global, Naspers, Accel Partners, and ICONIQ Capital plus an additional $160 million from Dragoneer Investment Group, Morgan Stanley Wealth Management, Sofina, Vulcan Inc., and Tiger Global.
- In February 2014, online fashion retailer Myntra.com raised US$50 million from a group of investors led by Premji Invest, the investment company floated by Azim Premji, Chairman of Wipro. May 2014 also witnessed Flipcart's acquisition of Myntra, reportedly for ₹2,000 crore.
- In September 2015, PepperTap raised US$36 million from Snapdeal and others.
- In July 2020, Purplle raised US$30 million from Goldman Sachs and others.
- In January 2021, business-to-business (B2B) Udaan raised US$280 million from new investors Moonstone Capital Partners and Octahedron Capital, besides existing investors Lightspeed Venture Partners, DST Global, GGV Capital, Altimeter Capital, and Tencent Holdings.

== Niche retailers ==
The spread of e-commerce has led to the rise of several niche players who largely specialise their products around a specific theme. As many as 1,06,086 websites were registered daily in 2015, more than 25 percent for niche businesses.

During 2014, Royal Enfield sold 200 special series bikes online.

Online apparel is one of the largest retail e-commerce segments in India. Together with computers and consumer electronics, it accounts for approximately 42 percent of total retail e-commerce sales. Some online apparel retailers, including Headbanger's Merch, Redwolf, and No Nasties, have partnered with independent musicians to produce and distribute merchandise. Other companies, such as Arvind, have introduced clothing lines intended primarily for online retail channels. Several online apparel retailers have also received venture capital funding. For example, Voxpop Clothing raised US$ 1 million in a funding round led by Blume Ventures in 2014.

As these niche businesses became popular, they were also becoming acquired. BabyOye was acquired by Mahindra Retail, part of the US$17 billion Mahindra Group. Ekstop was acquired by the Godrej Group to complement its offline chain of Nature's Basket stores. Similarly, Techjockey emerged as a specialized B2B marketplace for software solutions, offering enterprises access to a range of information technology (IT) products and services.

== Mergers and acquisitions ==
According to a report by Grant Thornton, as much as US$2.1 billion worth of mergers and acquisitions were inked in 2017 in the booming Indian e-commerce industry. Here is a list of mergers and acquisitions in India over a period of time:

Mergers and acquisitions in the Indian e-commerce Market
Date	Merger/Acquisition	Companies involved	Cost	Ref.
May 2014	Acquisition	Flipkart acquires Myntra	US$300 million	
March 2015	Acquisition	Snapdeal acquires Unicommerce	Undisclosed	
April 2015	Acquisition	Snapdeal acquires FreeCharge	US$400 million	
April 2016	Acquisition	Flipkart acquires PhonePe	Undisclosed	
June 2016	Acquisition	Myntra (owned by Flipkart) acquires Jabong	US$70 million	
July 2017	Acquisition	Axis Bank acquires FreeCharge	US$60 million	
May 2018	Acquisition	Walmart acquires Flipkart	US$16 billion	
January 2020	Acquisition	Zomato acquires Uber Eats	US$350 million	

== Regulation ==
Foreign e-commerce is subject to regulations in India. Under local law, foreign companies are to serve solely as marketplaces between vendors and their customers and are forbidden from holding inventory in the country. Under new regulations effective on 1 February 2019, foreign companies were forbidden from selling any products from vendors that they control or in which they have equity stakes, and also from entering into exclusivity deals between vendors and websites. This regulation was viewed as a counter to Amazon and Walmart's influence, which has given smaller traders a disadvantage.

In January 2026, the Union MInistry of Labour intervened to address working conditions in India's quick commerce (Q-commerce) sector. Union Labour Minister Mansukh Mandaviya held discussions with senior officials of Blinkit, Zepto, Swiggy, and Zomato, directing them to remove fixed delivery time commitments from their platforms and promotional materials in the interest of gig worker safety. Following the intervention, Blinkit revised its tagline from "10,000+ products delivered in 10 minutes" to "30,000+ products delivered at your doorstep" in 2026, with other platforms expected to follow. The move followed a nationwide strike by gig workers on New Year's Eve 2025, during which delivery partners across multiple states logged off platforms to demand better safety conditions, fair wages, and social security protections.

== See also ==
- BillDesk
- Disintermediation
