= Cyber Monday =

Monday after the Thanksgiving holiday

- Observed by: United States, Canada, United Kingdom, Brazil and Egypt
- Celebrations: Shopping
- Date: Monday after Thanksgiving
- 2025 date: December 1
- 2026 date: November 30
- 2027 date: November 29
- 2028 date: November 27
- Frequency: annual
- Related to: Thanksgiving, Christmas and Black Friday (shopping)

Cyber Monday is a marketing term for the Monday after Thanksgiving in the United States, to encourage e-commerce and online shopping. It is closely related to Black Friday, which occurs three days before. The date falls between November 26 and December 2, depending on the year.

Ellen Davis of the National Retail Federation coined the term "Cyber Monday" in a press release on November 28, 2005. Since its inception, it has become a marketing term used by online retailers around the world.

In 2017, Cyber Monday online sales grew to a record of $6.59 billion, compared with $2.98 billion in 2015 and $2.65 billion in 2014. However, the average order value was $128, down slightly from 2014's $160. The Cyber Monday on November 30, 2020 (the first during the COVID-19 pandemic) was the biggest online shopping day in US history, with a total of $10.7 billion in online spending.

== History ==
The amount of shopping done online increased dramatically in the late 1990s and early 2000s. In 2003, Tony Valado, who worked for 1800flowers.com, proposed an online shopping holiday called "White Wednesday" to be the day before Thanksgiving. The term "Cyber Monday" was coined by Ellen Davis and was first used within the e-commerce community during the 2005 holiday season. According to Scott Silverman, the head of Shop.org, the term was based on 2004 research showing that "one of the biggest online shopping days of the year" was the Monday after Thanksgiving (12th-biggest day historically). In late November 2005, The New York Times reported: "The name Cyber Monday grew out of the observation that millions of otherwise productive working Americans, fresh off a Thanksgiving weekend of window shopping, were returning to high-speed Internet connections at work Monday and buying what they liked."

== In countries ==
=== Australia ===
At 7 p.m. AEDT on November 20, 2012, Australian online retailers held a similar event for the first time, dubbed "Click Frenzy". Many websites immediately crashed, went offline, or had major server issues, including the Click Frenzy promotion website. David Jones, a major retailer, ran a competing sale dubbed 'Christmas Frenzy' on the same date.

=== Belgium ===
In Belgium, Cyber Monday has gained popularity since 2016. Due to several major online shops' Cyber Monday campaigns, the average revenue during Cyber Monday has increased by 50% compared to the 2015 edition.

=== Canada ===
Cyber Monday came to Canada in 2008 when the parity of the Canadian dollar with the US dollar caused Canadian retailers to have Black Friday and Cyber Monday sales of their own. It has been speculated that Canadian retailers attempted to mimic US sales offerings to keep Canadian dollars from being spent in the US. According to a 2010 article featured by the National Post, an estimated 80% of Canadians were expected to participate in Black Friday and Cyber Monday sales. By 2011, around 80% of online retailers in Canada were participating in Cyber Monday.

=== Chile ===
Chile's first Cyber Monday took place on November 28, 2011. The companies participating in the event were participants in the Santiago Chamber of Commerce's Electronic Commerce Committee. In 2015, the Chilean Cyber Monday had 85 stores participating, 390,000 transactions, and US$83 million in sales.

=== Colombia ===
The first Cyber Monday in Colombia took place on November 26, 2012. It was organized by the Colombian Chamber of Electronic Commerce and sponsored by the Ministry of IT and Telecommunications.

=== France ===
Inspired by the US phenomenon, the term Cyber Monday was first used in France in 2008.

=== Germany ===
Amazon.de announced that it had brought Cyber Monday to Germany in 2010.

=== India ===
India got its own version of the Cyber Monday (Great Online Shopping Festival) on December 12, 2012, when Google India partnered with many e-commerce companies including Flipkart, Snapdeal, HomeShop18, Indiatimes shopping, and MakeMyTrip. Google said that this was the first time an industry-wide initiative of this scale was undertaken. In November 2015, Google announced that the event would not be repeated.

=== Japan ===
Amazon.co.jp announced its own Cyber Monday in 2012. Amazon.co.jp ran the Cyber Monday Seven Day Sale from December 10 through December 16, 2012.

=== Netherlands ===
The term Cyber Monday was first used in the Netherlands in 2012. Since then, Dutch online retailers have taken advantage of Cyber Monday in promotional purposes, because timing aligns with the celebration of Sinterklaas, which is celebrated by buying gifts for each other in Netherlands. Since 2012, the popularity of Cyber Monday in the Netherlands has increased every year.

=== New Zealand ===
Online retailer Belly Beyond held the first Cyber Monday Sale in New Zealand on November 29, 2010. The sale lasted for five days, from Monday to Friday.

=== Poland ===
As of 2024, 52% of Poles participate in shopping on Black Friday and Cyber Monday.

=== Portugal ===
In Portugal, the term Cyber Monday was first used in 2009.

=== Sweden ===
In Sweden, Cyber Monday is growing rapidly, and several of the largest online retailers regularly launch Cyber Monday campaigns. Cyber Monday was first established on larger online retailers in Sweden in 2010.

=== United Kingdom ===
According to a 2009 The Guardian article, UK online retailers are now referring to "Cyber Monday" as the busiest internet shopping day of the year that commonly falls on the same day as the US Cyber Monday.

=== United States ===
In 2009, comScore reported that online spending increased by 5% on Cyber Monday to $887 million, and that more than half of dollars spent online at US websites originated from work computers (52.7%), representing a gain of 2.3% from the previous year. Buying from home comprised the majority of the remaining share (41.6%) while buying from international locations accounted for 5.8%. According to comScore chairman Gian Fulgoni:

comScore data have shown that Cyber Monday online sales have always been driven by considerable buying activity from work locations. That pattern hasn't changed. After returning from the long Thanksgiving weekend with a lot of holiday shopping still ahead of them, many consumers tend to continue their holiday shopping from work. Whether to take advantage of the extensive Cyber Monday deals offered by retailers or to buy gifts away from the prying eyes of family members, this day has become an annual ritual for America's online holiday shoppers.

In 2014, the average planned expenditure was $361 per person. 46% of people expected to pay with credit cards and 43% expected to pay with debit cards. Sales were up 8.1%, according to IBM Digital Analytics. The average order was $131.66, flat with the preceding year, though the number of transactions increased and people were buying more items on average per order.

In 2018, according to Adobe Analytics, Cyber Monday hit a record $7.9 billion of online spending, which was a 19.3% increase from a year previous. In 2019, Cyber Monday mobile transactions totaled $3.1 billion, with total online sales reaching a record $9.4 billion.

Cyber Monday sales in the US
Year	Sales (millions of USD)	% change
2006	608	▲26%
2007	733	▲21%
2008	846	▲15%
2009	887	▲5%
2010	1,028	▲16%
2011	1,251	▲22%
2012	1,465	▲17%
2013	1,735	▲18%
2014	2,038	▲17%
2015	2,280	▲12%
2016	2,671	▲17%
2017	3,364	▲26%

== See also ==
- Cyber Black Friday
- Green Monday
- Black Friday (shopping)
- Buy Nothing Day
- Small Business Saturday
- Super Saturday (Panic Saturday)
- Giving Tuesday
- Singles' Day
