= Binny Bansal =

Indian billionaire Internet entrepreneur

- Born: 1 December 1982 (age 43)
- Education: IIT Delhi
- Occupation: Businessman
- Known for: Co-founder, former chairman and CEO, Flipkart
- Spouse: Trisha Bansal

Binny Bansal (born 1982/1983) is an Indian billionaire Internet entrepreneur. As of February 2024, his net worth was estimated at US$1.4 billion. In 2007, he co-founded the e-commerce platform Flipkart. He was the chief operating officer (COO) until January 2016, when he was promoted to chief executive officer (CEO). He was promoted to group CEO in January 2017 but resigned in November 2018 following allegations of personal misconduct at Flipkart. He is an anchor investor in the venture firm 021 Capital. In 2019, Bansal invested in the endowment fund of the Indian Institute of Technology (IIT) Delhi.

== Early life ==
Binny Bansal was born around 1982/1983. His father was a chief manager at a bank and his mother is in the government sector. He is originally from Chandigarh, the capital city of Punjab and Haryana. He was educated at St. Anne's Convent School, Chandigarh. He studied software programming at IIT Delhi. He graduated from the Indian Institute of Technology Delhi with a degree in computer science and engineering.

== Career ==
=== Amazon ===
After college, he worked at Sarnoff Corporation. In January 2007, he joined Amazon as a software engineer, where he worked for nine months. Earlier in his career, he had been rejected by Google twice. He eventually left Amazon to co-found Flipkart.

=== Founding Flipkart ===
In 2007, he co-founded the e-commerce platform Flipkart. His business partner, Sachin Bansal, unrelated, also came from Chandigarh, and had been a fellow student at IIT Delhi, studying computer science engineering.

He and his co-founder pooled $6000 for startup costs and started operating out of their apartment.

Before co-founding Flipkart, Binny Bansal and his business partner Sachin Bansal initially thought of starting a comparison search engine but realized that the market for E-commerce in India was very small. Hence, after leaving Amazon in 2007, they founded Flipkart as an e-commerce company. Before joining Amazon, Binny had worked with Sarnoff Corporation for a year and a half, where he developed a lane sensor device for cars which would warn you and beep automatically if you changed lanes without giving a signal.

=== CEO of Flipkart ===
Bansal was the chief operating officer of Flipkart until January 2016, when he became chief executive officer (CEO), and worked on strategic development, direction and business management. In 2017, he assumed the role of CEO of Flipkart Group and his previous position was handed to Kalyan Krishnamurthy.

In 2018, Walmart acquired a 77% stake in Flipkart Group. After the acquisition, Bansal assumed the role of chairman and continued as group CEO. His 5.5% stake was valued at $1 billion after the acquisition.

He resigned from Flipkart in November 2018 on allegations of personal misconduct. According to the Wall Street Journal, a Walmart investigation failed to find evidence to corroborate sexual assault claims against him but revealed "other poor judgement calls" in how he had handled what he termed a consensual affair with a former Flipkart employee in 2016.

Bansal resigned from the executive team in January 2024, and has completely divested his stake. In the last year, Bansal, along with Excel and Tiger Global Management, sold their entire stake to Walmart, resulting in him earning $1.5 billion. Walmart acquired a 77% stake in Flipkart for $16 billion in May 2018.

=== Investing ===
He is an anchor investor in the venture firm 021 Capital which focuses on investing in the fields of biotechnology, agritech, and the internet.

He is also an angel investor in startups including BrightCHAMPS, Virgio, Flash, Hire Quotient and Glints.

In 2019, he invested 125 crores in the endowment fund of the Indian Institute of Technology (IIT) Delhi.

He also helped back about 47 companies across 64 funding rounds which include 28 deals in the seed stage, 14 in the early and 4 in late stage.

== Awards and recognition ==
In September 2015, Bansal along with Sachin Bansal, was named the 86th richest person in India with a net worth of $1.3 billion by Forbes India Rich List. In April 2016, Sachin and Binny Bansal were named in Time magazine's annual list of the 100 Most Influential People in the World. Afterwards, India Today ranked him #26th along with Sachin Bansal in India's 50 Most powerful people of 2017 list.

== Personal life ==
Bansal resides in Singapore. He has twin sons with his wife Trisha Bansal, a homemaker.

== See also ==
- List of IIT Delhi people
