= Navi Group =

Indian financial services company

Navi Limited
- Industry: Finance
- Founded: 10 December 2018; 7 years ago
- Founder: Sachin Bansal, Ankit Agarwal
- Headquarters: Bangalore, Karnataka, India
- Area served: India
- Services: Financial Services, Mutual Fund, Health Insurance
- Website: navi.com

Navi Limited is an Indian financial services company founded by Sachin Bansal and Ankit Agarwal in 2018. Navi operates in the space of digital Loans, home loans, mutual funds, health insurance, digital gold and UPI.

== History ==
In December 2018, Sachin Bansal, after his exit from Flipkart, along with IIT-Delhi batch mate Ankit Agarwal, founded BACQ Acquisitions Private Limited which was later renamed as Navi Technologies Private Limited. The company has its headquarters in Bengaluru.

Navi acquired the consulting firm MavenHive in 2019 to support its product development efforts. The company operates from an office in Bengaluru's Ibbaluru, Bellandur area.

In August 2023, it was announced Navi Group had sold Chaitanya Microfinance to the Mumbai-headquartered microfinance company, Svatantra Microfin for $178.5 million.

On 12 March 2022 Navi filed a draft for an INR 3350 crore IPO.

The RBI barred NBFC Navi from issuing new loans starting 21 October 2024, citing excessive lending rates and regulatory non-compliance. The restrictions were lifted in December 2024.

== Subsidiaries ==
Navi Technologies is the holding company and the subsidiaries are structured as

- Navi Finserv
- Navi General Insurance
- Navi AMC

=== Navi Finserv ===
In October 2019, Navi acquired Bengaluru based NBFC Chaitanya Rural Intermediation Development Services Private Limited (CRIDS) along with its wholly owned microfinance-NBFC Chaitanya India Private Limited (CIPL). CRIDS was later renamed as Navi Finserv Private Limited.

Navi launched a lending app for instant personal loans in June 2020, in Karnataka. Both CRISIL and India Ratings assigned a credit rating of A ‘Stable’ to the company's borrowings. Further loan disbursement by Navi finserv has been effectively banned by RBI since Oct 21, 2024 due to compliance issues

Navi acquired Essel Mutual Fund, which was given approval by SEBI in December 2020. In May 2021, Navi Mutual Fund moved their headquarters from Mumbai to Bengaluru, making it the first Bengaluru – headquartered asset management company.

=== Navi General Insurance ===
The company acquired DHFL General Insurance in January 2020 and renamed as Navi General Insurance Limited. It launched Navi Health, a ‘2-Minute’ online retail health insurance product, in 2021.

== See also ==
- Zerodha
- Angel One
- Robinhood Markets
