= The Great India Dance Off =

2020 Indian dance show

- Show poster
- Genre: Dance show
- Written by: Pratyush Srivastava
- Directed by: Advait Shelke
- Presented by: Terence Lewis
- Country of origin: India
- Original language: Hindi
- No. of seasons: 1
- No. of episodes: 25

Production
- Production location: Mumbai
- Running time: 10 minutes
- Production company: Frames Production Company

Original release
- Release: 29 August 2020

The Great India Dance Off is a dance competition series that debuted on video streaming platform Flipkart Video on 29 August 2020. It is an original show of Flipkart Video and is hosted/mentored by Indian dancer and choreographer Terence Lewis. The show encompasses ten dancers who are competing for the title of the Grand Winner. Contestants are divided amongst two groups, Ultimate Warriors and Ultimate Challengers and each participant will have a face-off with all participants from the other group. Viewers will be rating each performance and will also decide the winner of each dance-off.

== Overview ==
The Great India Dance Off is an interactive dance show. It features 10 popular dancers of the country who fight it out in dance battles. These dancers represent various dance forms including Popping, Contemporary, Bollywood, and are divided into two teams. The show consists of 25 dance battles, All battles are judged by viewers solely. Winner of each battle gets points, which are ratings given by the viewers and the contestant who gains the maximum points across all the challenges gets the title of 'Grand Winner.'

== Format ==
The show starts with Terence Lewis taking viewers through the concept and format of the show and then introduces two contending performers. After each battle, Terence gives his remarks mentioning highlights of the performances and encourages viewers to rate for the performance. At the end of the episode, Terence will allow the viewers to select the winner of the episode.

== Contestants ==
- Anurag Tomar
- Sadhwi Majumdar
- Monark Trivedi
- Mohit Jainth
- Rishabh Sharma
- Sheetal Pery
- Maharshi Pandya
- Rahul Soankar
- Arundhati Garnaik
- Shruti Bhalekar
