= FYI (disambiguation) =

FYI is an abbreviation of "for your information".

FYI may also refer to:

== Television ==
- FYI (Canadian TV channel)
- FYI (Southeast Asia TV channel)
- FYI (American TV channel)
- FYI (1980 TV series), an American daily information program on the ABC network
- F.Y.I. (2021 TV series), an Indian web series
- FYI Daily, a British entertainment news television bulletin
- FYI, a fictional television newsmagazine on the television show Murphy Brown
- FYI, a weekend news programme for children on Sky News
- FYI Bulletin, a past hourly public information service broadcast by the Philippine government television network, People's Television Network, and simultaneously on CTL Television Network.

== Information technology ==
- .fyi in list of Internet top-level domains
- A sub-series of Request for Comments

== Other uses ==
- "FYI", a song on Jay Electronica's 2007 mixtape Act I: Eternal Sunshine (The Pledge)
- "FYI", a song on Miranda Cosgrove's 2009 EP About You Now
- Film Your Issue, an American filmmaking competition
- FYI, a human resources publication published by Buck
