= Zindagi inShort =

2020 Indian anthology film

- Promotional poster
- Directed by: Tahira Kashyap; Punarvasu Naik; Vijayeta Kumar; Rakesh Sain; Gautam Govind Sharma; Smrutika Panigrahi; Vinay Chhawal
- Written by: Gautam Govind Sharma; Yogesh Chandekar; Charudutt Acharya; Tahira Kashyap; Sangeeta Mall; Smrutika Panigrahi; Vinay Chhawal
- Produced by: Guneet Monga; Achin Jain; Guneet Dogra; Vishal Bajaj; Divya Sud; Ranjan Singh
- Starring: Manjot Singh; Aisha Ahmed; Swaroop Sampat; Sanjay Kapoor; Divya Dutta; Neena Gupta; Shishir Sharma; Rima Kallingal; Rytasha Rathore; Nakuul Mehta; Deepak Dobriyal; Isha Talwar; Bijou Thaangjam; Vedika Nawani; Shafin Pate
- Production company: Sikhya Entertainment
- Distributed by: Flipkart Video
- Release date: 19 February 2020
- Running time: 20 minutes
- Country: India
- Languages: Hindi; English

Zindagi inShort (transl. Life in short) is a 2020 Indian Hindi-language anthology film. It is a Flipkart Video Original that comprises seven short films showcasing different stories, directed by a host of directors: Tahira Kashyap, Punarvasu Naik, Vijayeta Kumar, Rakesh Sain, Gautam Govind Sharma, Smrutika Panigrahi and Vinay Chhawal. The films are produced by Guneet Monga and Achin Jain of Sikhya Entertainment. This series of short films stars Divya Dutta, Neena Gupta, Sanjay Kapoor, Swaroop Sampat, Deepak Dobiryal, Isha Talwar, Bijou Thaangjam amongst others. It was released on Flipkart Video on 19 February 2020.

== Overview ==
Zindagi inShort is an anthology of short films that portray ordinary life. Every story depicts different stages of life and bittersweet moments that accompany them. These films touch on online romance, the innocence of childhood, the confusion of old age, infidelity, marital rape, a woman owning her role in the family and standing up for yourself when it's the hardest to do so.

== List of short films ==
Short films	Topic/Genre	Director	Producer(s)	Writer	Music composer	Cinematographer	Editor
Chhaju Ke Dahi Bhalle	Online Dating	Gautam Govind Sharma	Guneet Monga, Achin Jain	Gautam Govind Sharma	JAM8	Piyush Puty	Akshara Prabhakar
Nano So Phobia	Confusion of old age	Rakesh Sain	Vishal Bajaj	Yogesh Chandekar	Daniel B. George	Pratham Mehta	Dnayananda Samarth
Sleeping Partner	Marital Rape	Punarvasu Naik	Guneet Monga, Achin Jain	Charudutt Acharya	Rohan-Vinayak	Akash Agarwal	Unnikrishnan Prabhakaran
Pinni	The role of a mother in making our lives sweeter	Tahira Kashyap	Guneet Monga, Achin Jain	Tahira Kashyap	Utkarsh Dhotekar	Neha Parti Matiyani	Akshara Prabhakar
Sunny Side Upar	Looking at the positive sides in Life	Vijayeta Kumar	Divya Sud, Ranjan Singh	Sangeeta Mall	Natasha Pinto, Subhi	Priyanka Singh	Soham Hazra
Swaaha	Infidelity in a marriage	Smrutika Panigrahi	Guneet Monga, Achin Jain	Smrutika Panigrahi	Utkarsh Dhotekar	Ravi Kiran Ayyagiri	Akshara Prabhakar
Thappad	Innocence of childhood	Vinay Chhawal	Guneet Monga, Achin Jain	Vinay Chhawal	Utkarsh Dhotekar	Piyush Puty	Akshara Prabhakar

== Cast ==
The series features the following casts.

=== Chhaju Ke Dahi Bhalle ===
- Manjot Singh
- Aisha Ahmed as Amreen
- Geeta Agarwal Sharma as Amreen's mother

=== Nano So Phobia ===
- Swaroop Sampat
- Nidhi Singh
- Arun Kushwah

=== Sleeping Partner ===
- Sanjay Kapoor
- Divya Dutta
- Jitin Gulati

=== Pinni ===
- Neena Gupta
- Shishir Sharma

=== Sunny Side Upar ===
- Rima Kallingal
- Rytasha Rathore
- Nakuul Mehta

=== Swaaha ===
- Deepak Dobriyal
- Isha Talwar
- Bijou Thaangjam

=== Thappad ===
- Vedika Nawani
- Shafin Patel

== Release ==
The first look of the film was released on 8 February 2020, after an official announcement made by the producers along with Filpkart Video. After releasing several posters for separate short films, the official trailer was released on 12 February 2020. The anthology film was released on 19 February 2020 through Flipkart Video. After a year of its release, producer Guneet Monga announced that the film will be released through Netflix on 22 February 2021.

== Reception ==
Ruchi Kaushal of Hindustan Times reviewed "The slice-of-life stories have the ability to bestow you with the gift of smile and not just a slight tug of the upper lip but an ear-to-ear grin." Pratishruti Ganguly of Firstpost rated 4 out of 5 and wrote "For the most part though, Zindagi inShort proves to be worth your time. If you are in the mood to indulge in some web-watching this weekend, this omnibus of short, delectable nuggets of entertainment, sans the pressure of commitment to countless follow-up seasons, will not disappoint." Shubham Kulkarni of Koimoi gave the same rating and stated "Zindagi inShorts is a concept that needs to be promoted. Watch it to see how a story can be told in a limited timeframe without compromising on anything. Watch it to see how varies pallet of stories we have and endorse." Nandini Ramanath of Scroll.in summarised "The emphasis in Zindagi inShort is on feel-good, even when the evidence suggests that this isn't always possible. The spread, which has been produced by Guneet Monga's Sikhya Entertainment for Flipkart Video, consists of slices of life that are mostly sweet with a touch of the savoury and the spicy." Rahul Desai of Film Companion stated "Flipkart Video Originals’ Zindagi inShort is unrestricted by a common theme or, as it's known in producer parlance, a “peg”. At the worst of times, it turns into a gimmick. Each of Zindagi’s seven shorts looks like a story that the maker wants to tell rather than one that must forcibly fit a brief."
