= Cyber Black Friday =

Internet version of Black Friday

- Observed by: United States, Canada, United Kingdom and Brazil
- Celebrations: Shopping
- Date: Day after U.S. Thanksgiving
- 2025 date: November 28
- 2026 date: November 27
- 2027 date: November 26
- 2028 date: November 24
- Frequency: Annual
- Related to: Thanksgiving, Christmas and Black Friday (shopping)

Cyber Black Friday is a marketing term for the online version of Black Friday, the day after Thanksgiving Day in the United States. The term made its debut in a 2009 press release entitled "Black Friday Goes Online for Cyber Black Friday". According to TechCrunch, there was $9 billion in online sales on Cyber Black Friday, which is up 21.6% from 2019. With this, the average cart-size for a shopper was $95.60, and Shopify noted that there was an average of $6.3 million spent per minute across their more than one million merchant platform. A lot of this spending was directed towards technological devices, primarily smart phones. Of the $9 billion is sales, $3.6 billion (40%) was for smart phones. However, Cyber Black Friday is still inferior to its sister, Cyber Monday. Cyber Monday is primarily known to offer more discounted items, and is projected to reach sales between $11.2 billion and $13 billion in 2020. On a more promising note, Gian Fulgoni of comScore said, "Black Friday, better known as a shopping bonanza in brick-and-mortar retail stores, is increasingly becoming one of the landmark days in the online holiday shopping world." Some Cyber Black Friday sales are short-lived, last through the weekend, into Cyber Monday, and beyond.

== Origin of the term ==
'Cyber Black Friday' was created in 2009 by eCoupons.com after observing that online retailers launched their holiday sales before Cyber Monday to compete with the Black Friday brick and mortar frenzy. According to Talya Schaeffer, founder of Cyber Black Friday, "Cyber Black Friday sales are typically the largest of the season. Online retailers are hoping that by offering early discounts, consumers will shop early and often."

== Black Friday online sales ==
Black Friday Online Sales
Day	Year	Sales in Millions ($)	% Change
November 24	2006	$430	n/a
November 23	2007	$531	22%
November 28	2008	$534	1%
November 27	2009	$595	11%
November 26	2010	$648	9%
November 25	2011	$816	26%
November 23	2012	$1042	28%
November 29	2013	$1930	85%
November 28	2014	$2400	24%
November 27	2015	$2700	13%
November 25	2016	$3340	28%
November 24	2017	$5030	51%
November 23	2018	$6200	23%
November 29	2019	$7400	19%
Source: comScore, Inc.

In 2009, most major retailers began Black Friday-style sales online, betting that many would rather click for deals on Thanksgiving or Black Friday than wake up before dawn and head to stores in search of door-busters the following day. Dozens of retailers dangled special offers on their Web sites, though not all were identical to what could be found on Black Friday in stores. On July 23, 2010, Target.com announced its first ever "Back in Black Friday" one-day online-only sale. On October 27, 2010, Sears debuted its "Black Friday Now" campaign with a Black Friday sale on October 30 and 31 and every subsequent Friday until Christmas. Like other retailers, Sears started its Black Friday sale early because consumers were looking to shop earlier in the season and spread out spending in the weeks before Christmas. In 2011 sales was $816 million which is a 26 percent increase from 2010. In 2012 Sales was over one billion (1.042) which is 28 percent increase from 2011. This is the first time that Black Friday online shopping broke one billion dollar in sales. In 2013 Online Sales was 1.930 billion which is 85 percent increase from 2013. In 2014 Online sales was 2.400 billion which is a 24 percent increase. In 2015 Online sales was 2.7 billion which is a 13 percent increase. This increase was the lowest compared to the other years. In 2016 Online sales was 3.340 billion which is a 28 percent increase. In 2017 Online sales was 5.03 billion which is a 51 percent increase from 2016. Two billion dollar were on mobile sales alone. In 2018 Online Sales were 6.2 billion which is a 23 percent increase from 2017. In 2019, 93.2 million buyers made purchases online during Black Friday, amassing 7.4 billion dollars in revenue and surpassing Cyber Monday (83.3 million) in total online buyers There was a 19 percent increase compared to the year before. Also, with the ongoing COVID-19 pandemic, there was a 50% reduction in people that went in-store shopping for Black Friday compared to 2019, while online sales increased 22%.

== Consumer trends in other countries ==
As expected, other countries that also participate in Black Friday have seen the trend of transitioning from in-store Black Friday shopping to online. This is particularly evident in Israel, Europe, and Canada.

Black Friday is the biggest shopping day in Canada, surpassing Cyber Monday by 11 percent. Similar to the United States, the largest percentage of consumer purchases is in electronics. The second largest buying category, one that has become increasingly popular to buy online - is fashion. This is important to be noted as fashion has always been primarily bought in-store. As of 2019, there was an approximate equal number of shoppers who took Black Friday online and in-store. However, experts are reasonable to predict that there will be a larger gap in online versus in store shopping for 2020 with COVID-19.

Online sales on black Friday in Europe rose significantly in the years before the COVID-19 pandemic. In 2020, popular shopping categories included technology, health and fitness products, and kitchen appliances.

Black Friday has also become the biggest day for online shopping in Israel. Local retailers prepare weeks ahead for heavily increased online activity in the country. Increases in orders from the US has caused almost half of all canceled orders to be due to high shipping costs. The largest problem with the increased online sales for Israel is that it also attracts a large numbers of scammers, which has become an ongoing problem with big online shopping days in Israel.
