= Sachin Bansal =

Indian entrepreneur (born 1981)

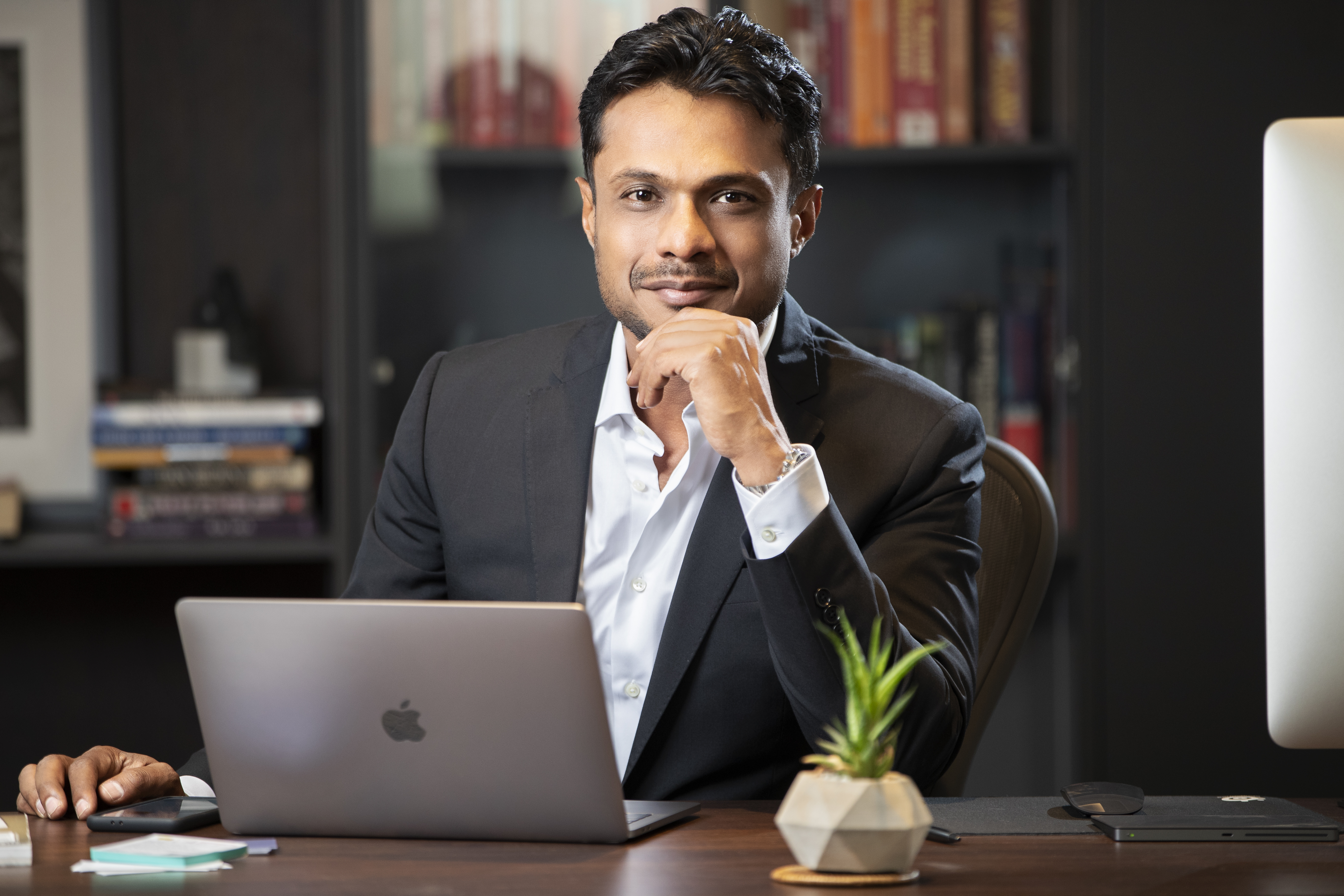
- Born: 5 August 1981 (age 45); Chandigarh, India
- Education: Indian Institute of Technology Delhi
- Occupation: Businessman
- Known for: Co-founder and CEO, Navi Group; Founder and former CEO and chairman, Flipkart
- Spouse: Priya Bansal
- Children: Ary Bansal

Sachin Bansal (born 5 August 1981) is an Indian entrepreneur. He is best known as the founder of Flipkart. During his over 11 year career at Flipkart, Bansal was CEO and chairman. In 2018, Bansal exited Flipkart following the Walmart deal.

In 2007, Sachin Bansal and Binny Bansal (not related) founded Flipkart whose valuation in 2018 was $20.8 billion. In 2018, Bansal held a 5.5 per cent stake in Flipkart, which he sold to Walmart and his net worth then was a little over $1 billion. Sachin Bansal is now the managing director of Navi Group, a financial services company.

== Early life ==
Bansal was born in Chandigarh, India, on 5 August 1981. His father is a businessman and his mother, is a homemaker.

Bansal was educated at St. Anne's Convent School, Chandigarh. After completing his schooling Sachin appeared for IIT JEE entrance exam and on his first attempt he got all India rank of 2470. It was there that he regularised his schedule even more. And then on his second attempt he got an All India rank of 49th after which he attended IIT Delhi and graduated with a B.Tech degree in Computer Science and Engineering. After graduation, Bansal worked at Techspan for a few months and later in 2006 he joined Amazon Web Services as a senior software engineer. In 2007, Bansal quit Amazon to start his own company.

== Flipkart ==
In October 2007, Bansal and his co-founder, Binny Bansal, started an online bookstore, Flipkart, with an initial capital of ₹4,00,000 (4 Lakh Rupees or US$4,764). They first started operating out of an apartment in Koramangala, in Bangalore, India. In the first few months, according to Bansal's own claims, he oversaw all business details, from building the first version of their website to sourcing book to packing and delivering them. From inception until 2016, Bansal held the position of Chief Executive Officer and from 2016 until 2018, he held the position of Executive Chairman. In 2018, Bansal signed a non-compete clause with Walmart and exited Flipkart. The non-compete clause restricted Bansal from starting any business that directly or indirectly competed with Flipkart for 18 months and in making any investments in businesses competing with Flipkart for 36 months from his departure.

== Post-Flipkart ==
In December 2018, Bansal founded BACQ Acquisitions Private Limited, a venture that focused on building and acquiring technology-driven businesses in diverse industry verticals. Since 2014, Bansal has made 18 investments in local, early-stage startups where the deal size was $1–2 million. In 2019, Bansal invested $100 million in Ola Cabs and received a stake holding of 0.37 per cent. In February 2019, he had investments in Ola, Grey Orange, Ather Energy, SigTuple, IN shorts, Unacademy and Terminus.

== Navi Technologies ==
In December 2019, Sachin Bansal's Navi Technologies acquired Bengaluru-based technology consulting firm Maven Hive. No financial details were disclosed.

Sachin acquired the general insurance brand COCO, previously owned by the housing finance company Deewan Housing Finance Limited, through his company Navi Technologies in 2020. In April 2020, Navi Technologies announced Sachin Bansal as its Managing Director, at the same time when the company disclosed raising 209 crore from Gaja Capital. On 12 March 2022, Navi Technologies filed a draft for an INR 3350 crore IPO.

== Recognition ==
- The Economic Times Entrepreneur of the Year, 2012–13.
- In 2015, Bansal was named as the 86th richest person in India by Forbes India.
- In 2016, Time Magazine included Bansal and his co-founder in the 100 most influential people in the world list.
- In 2017, India Today included Sachin Bansal and his co-founder in India's 50 most powerful people list.

== Personal life ==
Sachin Bansal is married to Priya Bansal Singh, a dentist by training and profession. They have one son, Aryaman.

=== Domestic violence allegations ===
In March 2020, Sachin Bansal's wife Priya Bansal filed a dowry harassment case against him alleging physical and sexual assault, and pressure to transfer properties to his name. She also alleged that Sachin sexually assaulted her sister. A first information report registered at the Koramangala police station on 28 February named four persons, including Sachin's parents, Sat Prakash Agarwal and Kiran Bansal and brother Nitin Bansal.

In response, Sachin Bansal and his family members filed petitions under the Code of Criminal Procedure before the High Court of Karnataka. The complaint as well as the FIR was quashed by the orders of High Court of Karnataka dated 13 August 2021 and 28 September 2021.

Priya Bansal subsequently filed a special leave petition before the Supreme Court of India challenging the earlier Order by the High Court of Karnataka. The said petition was dismissed by the Supreme Court of India on 11 March 2022.
