= Shopsy (company) =

Indian B2C e-commerce platform

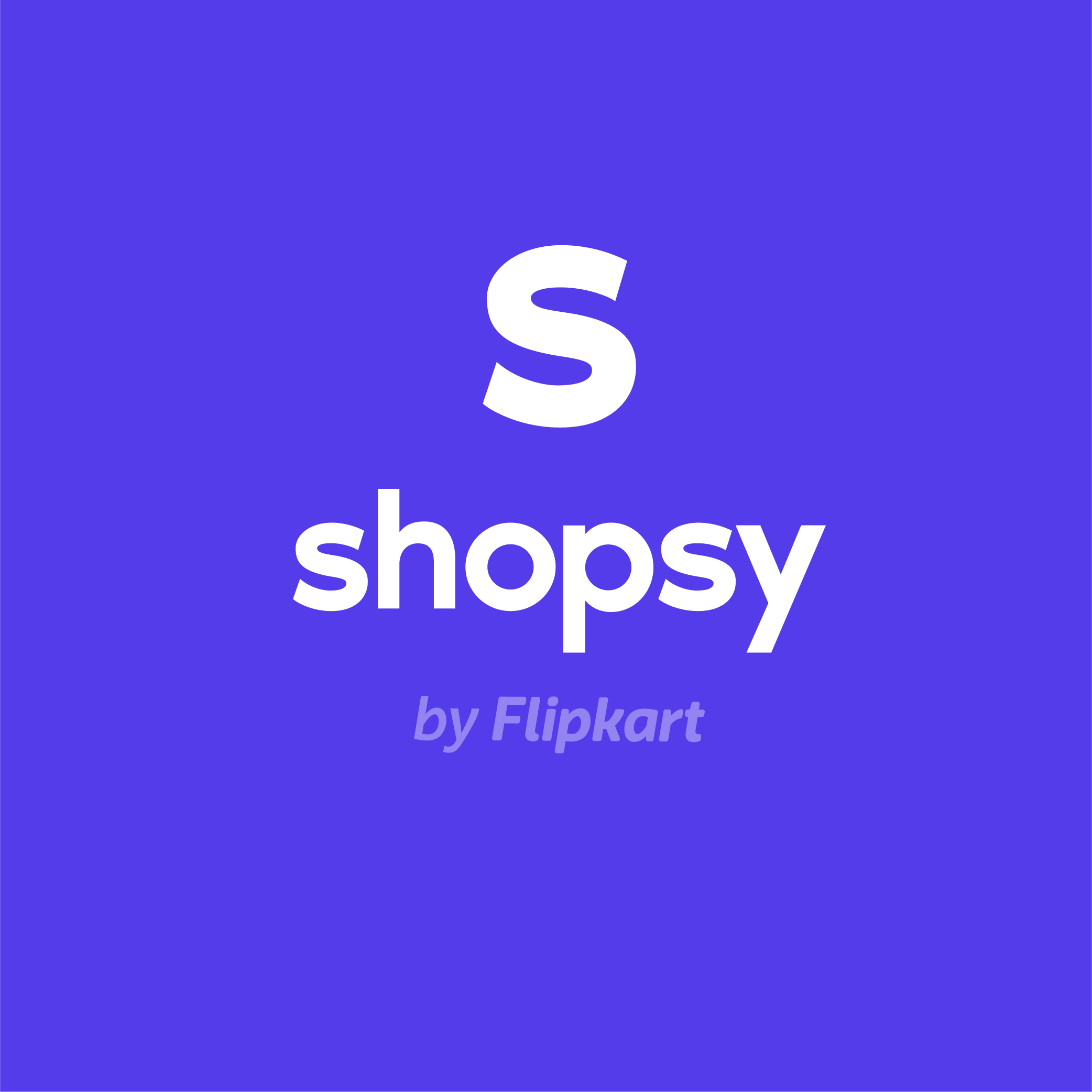
- Website type: E-commerce
- Headquarters: Bengaluru, Karnataka, India
- Owner: Flipkart
- Website: www.shopsy.in
- Launched: 1 July 2021; 5 years ago
- Current status: Active

Shopsy is an Indian B2C e-commerce platform launched by Flipkart in July 2021.

== History ==
Flipkart introduced Shopsy in July 2021 as a mobile app that allowed people in India to launch their own online reseller business. By August 2021, the app had adopted a zero-commission marketplace model. Later, Shopsy shifted its focus to become a B2C company. In December 2021, the app launched e-grocery services across 700 cities in India. In March 2022, Shopsy appointed Indian actor Sara Ali Khan as its brand ambassador.

Shopsy was earlier helmed by Flipkart's SVP – Growth & Monetisation, Prakash Sikaria until July 2022. In the same month, Adarsh Menon, senior vice president, and head of new businesses at Flipkart, took over the leadership at Shopsy. In August 2022, Shopsy had 100 million users.

In September 2022, the company launched Grand Shopsy Mela for direct customers and eventually introduced a vernacular search for addressing the non-English speaking demographic. As of December 2022, the mobile app had 11 lakh sellers with 68% of its customers coming from Tier-2 Indian cities. In February 2023, Flipkart announced that Shopsy accounted for 40% of its new customers.

== Business model ==
Shopsy is a zero-commission marketplace model for sellers in India. It is a digital commerce initiative by Flipkart, the Bengaluru-headquartered and Walmart-owned e-commerce company with over US$7.7 billion in annual revenue (FY 2022).

== Awards ==
- Google Play Best of Users' Choice Award for 2022.
