= Cleartrip =

Global online travel company

Cleartrip (previously known as Cleartrip Travel Services Private Limited) is a global online travel agency, headquartered in Mumbai.

== History ==
Cleartrip was founded in 2006 as a hotels and air aggregator by Stuart Crighton, Hrush Bhatt, and Matthew Spacie. Seeing the fragmentation that existed in the Indian travel and hospitality sector, the founders decided to enter the online travel space.

Cleartrip also operates Cleartrip for Business, an online corporate travel management tool; Agent Box, a travel tool for travel agents; and Cleartrip Mobile, a travel booking app for mobile devices. In 2012, it launched new services such as Quickeys, a hotel booking application and other journey planning services.

In January 2013, Cleartrip brought air, rail and bus tickets to Apple's Passbook. The same year the company undertook a massive UI redesign project, Tuxedo where every field in the website was thought through in terms of placement, display, action.

In 2014, Cleartrip Mobile was recognized as part of Apple's Best of 2014 Trends of the year and also featured as the ‘Editor's Pick.

In April 2018, Cleartrip launched an Arabic version of its website to target the growing Arabic community in the GCC region.

In May 2018, Cleartrip launched an app for Amazon's Alexa voice assistant that enables Alexa users to voice search air travel options.

In 2018, Cleartrip was named as one among the only two companies that followed the GDPR and allowed users to delete personal information associated with their accounts.

In June 2020, Cleartrip announced the launch of TravelSafe – an initiative that allowed customers to get information of the latest travel restrictions on account of the COVID-19 pandemic.

== Acquisition & Partnership ==
In 2017, Google announced partnership with Cleartrip for its flight search application, Google Flights.

In May 2018, Cleartrip had extended its partnership with Klook and TUI, global activity platforms to amplify its integrated travel services in 48 European and 18 Southeast Asian countries.

In June 2018, Cleartrip announced its partnership with Kerala Tourism Development Corporation to become an online seller of KTDC's exclusive set of activities.

In 2019, e-commerce company Amazon forayed into the flight booking space by partnering with Cleartrip.

In November 2019, Cleartrip entered into a partnership with PAYBACK India for a loyalty program.

In 2021, Cleartrip expanded its partnership with Sabre as a strategy to streamline its GDS relationships and to make Sabre its GDS partner.

In April 2021, Cleartrip was acquired in an undisclosed deal by Walmart owned Flipkart.

In October 2021, the Adani group picked up a minority stake in Cleartrip for an undisclosed amount.

== Operations ==
Kleiner Perkins Caufield & Byers, Ram Shriram and DAG Ventures were some of the early investors in Cleartrip.

In May 2010, Cleartrip launched its first overseas venture in the UAE. In May 2012, it expanded its operations to the Persian Gulf nations of Oman, Qatar, Kuwait, Bahrain, and Saudi Arabia. On June 21, 2018, Cleartrip announced the acquisition of Saudi Arabia-based online travel aggregator Flyin.
