= Back Benchers =

Indian celebrity quiz show

- Genre: Quiz show
- Presented by: Farah Khan
- Country of origin: India
- Original language: Hindi
- No. of seasons: 1
- No. of episodes: 20

Original release
- Network: Flipkart Video
- Release: 19 October 2019

Back Benchers (Class ka Pehla Din) is an Indian celebrity quiz show hosted by film producer and director, Farah Khan. The show debuted on Flipkart Video in October 2019, featuring Anil Kapoor and Shilpa Shetty as the first guests of the show.

== Overview ==
Back Benchers is a non-fiction show which features Bollywood celebrities as students. Back Benchers is the first original series from Flipkart Video and can be watched for free on the Flipkart app in the Flipkart Video section. The show is hosted by Farah Khan who portrays the dean of the school. Every episode sees stars trying to get the position of a Back Bencher in Farah's class. The show puts the guests in the hot seat, testing their general knowledge through a series of oral as well as written tests. Celebrity guests can score marks on every right answer across three different rounds, additionally, guests can also score grace marks as awarded by Dean Farah Khan upon performing entertaining acts during the show. The series consists of 20 episodes in its first season and the first episode was broadcast on Flipkart on 19 October 2019.

== Regular Segments ==
The show consists of three segments, after each round, the scores are revealed and the guest with the most points wins

Oral test: In this round, questions are asked to the guests to test their general knowledge

Written test: The guests are asked to write down their answers on the blackboard

Speed test: The segment includes a rapid-fire Q and A with Farah asking guests a similar set of questions

Step of the day: Farah challenges her guests to replicate a pre-decided step of the day which is then thrown open to TikTok users

== Season ==
During the first season of Back Benchers, several Bollywood celebrities have visited the show and participated in fun and games. The entire list is present

Episodes	Titles	Guest(s)	Duration
1	Jhakaas Anil vs Royal Shilpa starring Anil Kapoor & Shilpa Shetty	Anil Kapoor & Shilpa Shetty	35m
2	Saand Ki Aankh Special starring Tapsee Pannu, Bhumi Pednekar, & Vineet Kumar Singh	Tapsee Pannu, Bhumi Pednekar, & Vineet Kumar Singh	31m
3	Sporty Sania Vs Filmy Parineeti starring Sania Mirza & Parineeti Chopra	Sania Mirza & Parineeti Chopra	29m
4	Made in China Special starring Rajkumar Rao & Boman Irani	Rajkumar Rao & Boman Irani	29m
5	Murga Bana Shikaar starring Manoj Bajpayee & RJ Naved	Manoj Bajpayee & RJ Naved	29m
6	Get 'Fukrey'ed on Back Benchers starring Richa Chadda, Manjot Singh, & Varun Sharma	Richa Chadda, Manjot Singh, & Varun Sharma	35m
7	Jacqueline Rohit go bonkers starring Rohit Shetty & Jacqueline Fernandez	Rohit Shetty & Jacqueline Fernandez	32m
8	Copycat Choocha starring Varun Sharma & Sonakshi Sinha	Varun Sharma & Sonakshi Sinha	36m
9	Marjaavaan Special starring Riteish Deshmukh, Rakul Preet Singh, & Milap Zaveri	Riteish Deshmukh, Rakul Preet Singh, & Milap Zaveri	30m
10	Hot Malaika Vs Cool Maniesh starring Malaika Arora & Maniesh Paul	Malaika Arora & Manish Paul	37m
11	Jahnvi Ke Choocha Bhaiya starring Janhvi Kapoor & Varun Sharma	Janhvi Kapoor & Varun Sharma	29m
12	Ananya Ke Tony Stark starring Ananya Panday & Chunky Pandey	Ananya Panday & Chunky Pandey	31m
13	Arjun as "Sanju Baba" starring Arjun Kapoor & Kusha Kapila	Arjun Kapoor & Kusha Kapila	34m
14	Bharti Padi Bhaari starring Bharti Singh & Raveena Tandon	Bharti Singh & Raveena Tandon	0m
15	Pati Patni Aur Woh Special starring Ananya Panday, Bhoomi Pednekar, & Kartik Aryan	Ananya Panday, Bhumi Pednekar, & Kartik Aaryan	35m
16	Musical Ride with Vishal and Shekhar starring Vishal and Shekhar	Vishal Dadlani and Shekhar Ravjiani	34m
17	Dhuandaar Gaurav with Gorgeous Neha starring Gaurav Kapoor & Neha Dhupia	Gaurav Kapoor & Neha Dhupia	32m
18	'Flute'licious Neha Kakkar starring Neha Kakkar & Jassie Gill	Neha Kakkar & Jassi Gill	29m
19	Wasseypur Ki Rani starring Huma Quershi & Prajakta Koli	Huma Quershi & Prajakta Koli	27m
20	Anna and Bhidu starring Suniel Shetty & Jackie Shroff	Suniel Shetty & Jackie Shroff	35m
