= Kaun? Who Did It? =

Indian interactive crime show

- Show poster
- Genre: Crime
- Created by: Umesh Bist
- Written by: Sunjoy Shekhar
- Directed by: Saket Yadav; Asif Malik
- Starring: Sushant Singh; Samvedna Suwalka
- Theme music composer: Sanjay Dhakan
- Country of origin: India
- Original language: Hindi
- No. of seasons: 3
- No. of episodes: 99

Production
- Producers: Guneet Monga; Achin Jain
- Production locations: Mumbai, Maharashtra, India
- Cinematography: Sonu Paswan; Abhishek Shukla
- Editor: Akshara Prabhakar
- Running time: 17 minutes
- Production company: Sikhya Entertainment

Original release
- Release: 9 January 2021

Kaun? Who Did It? is an Indian interactive crime show that debuted on Flipkart Video on 9 January 2021. The series stars Indian actors Sushant Singh as Detective Adi Bhagat and Samvedna Suwalka as Inspector Malini. The location of the series is set in Mumbai, Maharashtra, India. The series was produced by Guneet Monga's production house, Sikhya Entertainment with Sunjoy Shekhar as writer and Umesh Bisht as showrunner. The show concluded its first season with 35 episodes. The second season was announced by Flipkart on its official YouTube channel on 20 May 2021 with a trailer and launched on 24 May 2021.

== Overview ==
Kaun? Who Did It? is an interactive crime fiction show that follows a retired ex-cop turned private detective, Adi Bhagat, and his protégé inspector Malini. Launched on 9 January 2021, season 1 has 33 daily episodes with a new murder case every day. After Adi and Malini go through the case details, suspect interrogations and evidence, the show allows users to play detective where they are able to guess who the killer is before Adi reveals it himself. If the user is right, they can win prizes from Flipkart.

== Cast ==
- Sushant Singh as Detective Aadi Bhagat
- Samvedna Suwalka as Inspector Malini
- Aniruddh Roy as Dabloo Rawat
- Himanshu Bamzai as Lakshya
- Shabaaz Abdullah Badi as Manav
- Deepshikha Nagpal
- Surabhi Tiwari as Pallavi
- Luck mehta
- Prachi Hadda as Moira
- Kavita Banerjee as Suzzanne Khambata
- Priya Arora as Poonam
- Mukesh Tripathi as Harsh Singh [EP 27)

== Production ==
The first look of the series was released on 23 December 2020 with an intriguing poster that features Sushant Singh and Samvedna Suwalka. The poster uncovers a somber Sushant oozing with mystery along with assistant police inspector, Samvedna, while they solve complicated crime mysteries.

The show was announced using an optical illusion teaser on 26 December on Flipkart Video's YouTube followed by the official trailer which was launched on 6 January 2021.

== Release ==
Kaun? Who Did It? is a Flipkart Video original series which aired on the Flipkart app from 9 January 2021.
