= Sabse Funny Kaun =

2020 Indian web series

- Show poster
- Genre: Comedy show
- Directed by: Nazar Abbas
- Presented by: Varun Sharma
- Country of origin: India
- Original language: Hindi
- No. of seasons: 1

Production
- Production location: Mumbai
- Running time: 10 minutes
- Production company: Optimystix Entertainment

Original release
- Release: 28 September 2020

Sabse Funny Kaun? is a 2020 Indian stand-up comedy show hosted by actor and comedian Varun Sharma. The show is an original series of Flipkart Video which was launched on Flipkart app on 28 September 2020.

== Show format ==
It is a Hindi-language show where the participants perform their act and then contend against one another. The show features a round-robin format where participants are eliminated after several losses. Each episode lasts for a little over 10 minutes and at the end of each episode, one winner is declared who moves ahead in the competition. Any four contestants who get the most votes from viewers will go to the semi-final round. In the final round, two contestants will face off against each other and the cumulative scores of all rounds will be used to determine the winner.

== Host ==
- Varun Sharma

== Contestants ==
The show features the following contestants

- Inder Sahani
- Dr. Bhuvan Mohini
- Ravi Badshami
- Arisha
- Himanshu Bawandar
- Aariz
- Dinesh Bawra
- Satyapal
- Gourav Mahna
- Monica Murthy
