= BillDesk =

Indian online payment gateway company

- Company type: Private
- Industry: Finance
- Founded: 2000; 26 years ago
- Founder: M.N. Srinivasu; Ajay Kaushal; Karthik Ganapathy
- Headquarters: Mumbai, Maharashtra, India
- Area served: India
- Services: Payment platform E-commerce payment system Bill payment
- Revenue: ▲₹2,124 crore (US$220 million) (FY 2021)
- Net income: ▲₹245 crore (US$26 million) (FY 2021)
- Number of employees: 800+
- Parent: IndiaIdeas.com Ltd
- Subsidiaries: Loylty Rewardz; Jocata
- Website: www.billdesk.com

BillDesk is an Indian online payment gateway company based in Mumbai. The company provides an online payment platform for its clients which enables banking and merchant website transactions.

== History ==
BillDesk was founded by Indian entrepreneurs M.N. Srinivasu, Ajay Kaushal and Karthik Ganapathy in 2000. The three previously worked at American accounting firm Arthur Andersen LLP.

== See also ==
- Infibeam Avenues
- e-commerce in India
- Payment and settlement systems in India
