= Super Fan (game show) =

2020 Indian game show

- Genre: Game show
- Presented by: Anupama Chopra
- Country of origin: India
- Original language: Hindi
- No. of seasons: 1

Production
- Production location: India
- Running time: 12 minutes
- Production company: Film Companion

Original release
- Release: 10 July 2020

Super Fan is an Indian celebrity game show hosted by film critic and television anchor, Anupama Chopra. The show is produced by the Film Companion and debuted on Flipkart Video on 10 July 2020. Super Fan is an original series on Flipkart Video and is aired weekly on Flipkart app, where viewers are asked questions about celebrities. The first episode was aired on 10 July 2020, featuring Kareena Kapoor. The next set of celebrities include Jacqueline Fernandez, Tapsee Pannu, Sara Ali Khan, Ananya Pandey, and so on.

== Overview ==
Super Fan is an interactive celebrity game show which is aired every Friday on Flipkart. It is 10–12 minutes long. In every episode, a celebrity guest takes part in the show. Each celebrity will ask the fans certain questions about their lives which are not popularly known. Celebrity will reveal the answers in the same episode itself and fans will get intricate insights on the Celeb’s personal lives. The audience gets a week to play and submits their answers.

== Show format ==
The show begins with Anupama Chopra introducing the celebrity of the week, followed by a direct to camera video of the celebrity. The celebrity does a small message for all of his/her fans and then jumps into asking 10 questions about themselves that only their superfan would know.

=== Regular segments ===
The questions are divided into three segments.

- Personal choices: These questions will be around the celebrity’s personal preferences, habits, and anecdotes that are not public knowledge.
- True or False: These again will be personal facts that the celebrity would share and the format would True or False.
- Film Questions: These questions will be based on their film choices, experiences, and their own filmography.
