= Entertainer No.1 =

2020 Indian reality show

Entertainer No.1 is a 2020 Indian reality show hosted/judged by Bollywood actor Varun Dhawan. The show is a Flipkart Video original and was launched on 13 April 2020 on Flipkart app, featuring Varun Dhawan who encourages Indians to entertain from home.

== Format ==
Entertainer No.1 is an eight-week show in the form of a talent competition judged by Varun Dhawan, Bharti Singh & Raghav Juyal, that lets anyone older than 13 years participate in the show. Every week a new challenge is thrown at the contestants. Participants need to upload their performance video directly in the Flipkart video section on the Flipkart App. Every week prizes are distributed to whichever video garners most hearts (likes) and the participant with the maximum number of cumulative hearts (likes) across all challenges wins the title of Entertainer No.1.

== Seasons ==
=== Season 1 ===
Entertainer no. 1 is a reality show consisting of eight challenges that contestants have to overcome. The first season ended in June 2020 and Yuvraj Singh, also known as Baba Jackson, bagged the title of 'India's Entertainer No.1', winning a prize of Rs 1 crore.

== Cast ==
- Varun Dhawan as host
- Bharti Singh as mentor
- Raghav Juyal as mentor
