= Kya Bolti Public =

Indian game show season 2

- Genre: Game show
- Presented by: Dheeraj Juneja
- Country of origin: India
- Original language: Hindi
- No. of seasons: 3
- No. of episodes: 30

Original release
- Release: 16 April 2020

Kya Bolti Public (transl. What say people) is an Indian game show that debuted on Flipkart Video in April 2020. It is a poll-based show where the contestants are asked five questions. Each question has two options and the right answer depends on the popular choice. The show is an original series of Flipkart Video hosted by Dheeraj Juneja and the first season consisting of, thirty episodes, was originally aired from 16 April 2020 to 15 May 2020. Flipkart launched the second season of Kya Bolti Public on 19 June 2020.

== Show format ==
Kya Bolti Public is a Hindi show where home viewers are the contestants and are asked poll questions. In every episode the host Dheeraj Juneja asks three questions with two options to choose from and the viewers have to guess what the majority would answer. The ones who guess correctly stand a chance to win huge prizes. In the second season, every participants submitting correct answers wins prizes. In each contest, one participant wins a ₹1,00,000 gift card, 100 participants win a ₹1,000 gift card, and remaining participants submitting correct answers are rewarded with 2-5 Supercoins each.

== Cast ==
- Dheeraj Juneja as host
