= Nano So Phobia =

2020 short film

- Film poster
- Directed by: Rakesh Sain
- Written by: Yogesh Chandekar
- Produced by: Vishal Bajaj
- Starring: Swaroop Sampat; Nidhi Singh; Arun Kushwah
- Cinematography: Pratham Mehta
- Edited by: Dnayananda Samarth
- Music by: Daniel B. George
- Production company: Sikhya Entertainment
- Distributed by: Flipkart Video
- Release date: 19 February 2020
- Running time: 18 minutes
- Country: India
- Language: Hindi

Nano so Phobia (Gujrati: નેનો સો ફોબિયા; transl. A small phobia) is a 2020 Indian Hindi-language Drama Film written by Yogesh Chandekar and directed by Rakesh Bajaj. A Flipkart Video original, it is a part of the anthology film Zindagi inShort produced by Sikhya Entertainment. Starring Swaroop Sampat, Nidhi Singh and Arun Kushwah, the film has music by Daniel B. George, cinematography by Pratham Mehta and edited by Dnayananda Samarth. The film was released on Flipkart Video on 19 February 2020.

== Plot ==
Mrs. Balsara (Swaroop Sampat), an elderly Parsi lady suffering from dementia, stays alone, while her daughter Meru lives in Boston. One afternoon, Mrs. Balsara sees her servant Rancho (Arun Kushwah) entering her house with a mask and a big knife. While the lady is in a state of shock and fear, Rancho tries to rob her of money. When he is busy counting the cash, Mrs. Balsara hits him with a potted rose plant and rushes to get help. A young tenant (Nidhi Singh) finds her in a state of panic and calms her down, reminding her that Rancho had robbed her 6 months back. She tells her that she is having another flashback of the incident, of which she has developed a deep fear. Still confused, Mrs. Balsara heads back home, as the girl walks towards her car. Suddenly, Rancho lands on the car, who Mrs. Balsara threw off her balcony. The film ends with Mrs. Balsara smiling peacefully as she waters the wilted rose plant, she hit Rancho with. In its essence, the story talks about how a fragile woman threw out the fear resting in her mind and emerged a stronger person.

== Cast ==
- Swaroop Sampat as Mrs. Balsara
- Arun Kushwah as Rancho
- Nidhi Singh as Young Tenant

== Reception ==
According to Pratishruti Ganguly of Firstpost, the short film became one of the most remarkable films of the anthology with the "story and its life-affirming ending aside, its sharp editing (masterfully done by Dnyanada Samarth) and Daniel B George's booming operatic background score". Rahul Desai of Film Companion wrote "Rakesh Sain’s Nano So Phobia, is too satisfied with its light-hearted gaze and theatrical punchline instead of aiming to examine the cultural epidemic of lonely pensioners through the lens of full-blown black comedy."
