= Virgio =

Indian fashion technology company

- Company type: Private
- Industry: Fashion technology
- Founded: 2022
- Founder: Amar Nagaram
- Headquarters: Bengaluru, Karnataka, India
- Key people: Amar Nagaram (Founder & CEO)
- Website: www.virgio.com

Virgio is an Indian fashion technology company founded in 2022 by Amar Nagaram, former CEO of Myntra. The company initially operated as a fast fashion brand before shifting its focus to sustainable and circular fashion models in 2023. Virgio operates primarily online, targeting Generation Z and millennial consumers, with offices in India and the United Arab Emirates.

== History ==
Virgio was founded in early 2022 by Amar Nagaram following his departure as CEO of Myntra in 2021. Nagaram had previously held executive roles at Flipkart and Myntra. The company launched as a direct-to-consumer fast fashion e-commerce platform focusing on women's apparel. In December 2022, Virgio raised US$37 million in a Series A funding round led by Prosus Ventures, Accel, and Alpha Wave Global. The funding was intended to support team expansion and technology development, and valued the company at approximately US$160 million.

In October 2023, the company announced a strategic transition towards sustainable and circular fashion. This included a shift toward using more natural fabrics and reducing reliance on synthetic materials, as well as incorporating recycling and upcycling practices into its operations. As part of this transition, Virgio reportedly returned a portion of its previously raised capital to investors.

In 2024, Virgio received PETA Approved Vegan certification and was recognized as the Company of the Year at the PETA India Vegan Fashion Awards for its adoption of animal-free materials and sustainable practices.

The company expanded into offline retail in September 2024 through a partnership with Broadway, launching a retail presence at Ambience Mall in Vasant Kunj, New Delhi. In December 2024, Virgio opened its first standalone store in Bangalore.

In March 2025, Virgio became the sustainable fashion partner for the International Indian Film Academy's (IIFA) 25th-anniversary celebrations in Jaipur. The following month, the company announced a collaboration with Dr. Mahra Lutfi (Miss UAE and Miss Planet International) as its sustainability ambassador.

== Recognition ==
- 2024: PETA India Vegan Fashion Awards - Company of the Year

== See also ==
- Fashion in India
- Sustainable fashion
