= Sleeping Partner (film) =

2020 short film

- Promotional poster
- Directed by: Punarvasu Naik
- Written by: Charudutt Acharya
- Produced by: Guneet Monga; Achin Jain; Guneet Dogra
- Starring: Divya Dutta; Sanjay Kapoor
- Cinematography: Akash Agarwal
- Edited by: Unnikrishnan Prabhakaran
- Music by: Rohan-Vinayak
- Production company: Sikhya Entertainment
- Distributed by: Flipkart Video
- Release date: 19 February 2020
- Running time: 22 minutes
- Country: India
- Language: Hindi

Sleeping Partner is a 2020 Indian Hindi-language drama film that sheds light on domestic violence and marital rape. Starring Divya Dutta and Sanjay Kapoor, this film is a Flipkart Video Original and part of an anthology of seven short films titled Zindagi inShort produced by Guneet Monga of Sikhya Entertainment. The film was released on 19 February 2020.

== Cast ==
- Divya Dutta as Beena
- Sanjay Kapoor as Sahay
- Jitin Gulati as Ravish

== Reception ==
Pratishruti Ganguly of Firstpost gave a mixed review stating "Despite the superb acting though, one may find Sleeping Partner a tad too melodramatic and Bollywood-ised, especially in the end." In contrast, Ruchi Kaushal of Hindustan Times and Nandini Ramanath of Scroll.in gave a positive note and also praised Divya Dutta's characterisation, with the former stating that "It’s enough to leave you impressed not just with Divya’s character arc but also how a woman finds courage inside herself." and the latter wrote "The feminist lite treatment ensures a conclusion that nobody saw coming. Yet, Dutta is affecting as the bruised wife, and Sanjay Kapoor is turning out to be a fine cameo artist in small but well-written parts." Rahul Desai of Film Companion noted "The film subverts the extramarital template and pitches a woman against the general arrogance of mankind: a tightrope walk that doesn’t fall prey to the woke, kitchen-sink-brand feminism expected from storytellers these days."
