= Matthew Spacie =

British entrepreneur and humanitarian (born 1967)

- Born: Matthew Spacie; January 19, 1967 (age 59); United Kingdom
- Education: Nottingham Trent University; State University of New York
- Occupations: Social entrepreneur, Humanitarian
- Years active: 1986–present
- Known for: Founder of Magic Bus
- Board member of: DASRA
- Spouse: Ashima Narain
- Children: 3
- Awards: Elected for Ashoka Fellowship; Member of the British Empire
- Website: Matthew Spacie bio at Magic Bus

Matthew Spacie (born 19 January 1967) is India-based British entrepreneur, humanitarian, and a former international rugby player. Matthew is the co-founder of Cleartrip, a global online travel company. He is also the former chief operating officer (COO) of the travel group, Cox & Kings Ltd. He is the founder of Magic Bus (also known as the Magic Bus India Foundation), a non-governmental organisation working with children and youth taking them from childhood to livelihood. Magic Bus has 3 million young people in its programmes from some of the most impoverished backgrounds and has placed nearly 500,000 young people in sustainable employment making it one of the worlds largest livelihood non-profits in the world. Magic Bus has nearly 4,000 full time staff in six countries.

He has been accorded numerous accolades including Member of the Order of the British Empire and Business Standard Social Entrepreneur of the Year 2018.

== Career ==
Born to an Army father in Cyprus, Matthew is a British citizen and currently lives in Mumbai, India, with his family. He attended boarding school in the United Kingdom. He first came to India in 1986 at the age of nineteen and worked as a volunteer with Mother Teresa's Missionaries of Charity organisation in Calcutta when he was just out of college.

Matthew returned to the UK, to pursue graduate studies in BA Humanities at the Nottingham Trent University and New York State University. Following his graduation and a number of management positions in the UK, Matthew was posted to India in 1996, as the chief operating officer of the travel group Cox & Kings Ltd. During his time at Cox & Kings, Matthew played rugby for the Indian national team and was awarded international rugby caps for India and playing in the World Cup Qualifiers in 2001. He spent much of his spare time practicing rugby at the Bombay Gymkhana. Outside his club, he observed a group of boys, hanging around its premises, watching the game with interest. He invited them into the club and began coaching them.

In 1999, Matthew founded Magic Bus with a group of street and slum-dwelling children from Mumbai. It was an opportunity for these children to engage in sports as a momentary relief from their day-to-day challenges. In 2001, Matthew resigned his job at Cox & Kings to focus full time on Magic Bus. He teamed up with an NGO named Akanksha with the intention of providing children a weekend break away from the difficulties of their everyday lives. Every fortnight he hired a bus taking the rugby boys to mentor younger children from local NGOs, to a hill station or the beach. The children started calling this the Magic Bus. At an early stage Matthew saw that using sport and good local mentors to intervene and influence young vulnerable people was an effective way to change behavior and move people from poverty.

Magic Bus is one of the largest non profits in India that leads the fight against poverty. Since its inception in 1999, Magic Bus has transformed the lives of more than six million children and young people and helped them move out of poverty through its childhood to livelihood programme. Magic Bus has 3 million young people in its programmes from some of the most impoverished backgrounds and has placed nearly 500,000 young people in sustainable employment making it one of the worlds largest livelihood non-profits in the world. Magic Bus has nearly 4,000 full time staff in six countries.

In 2006, Matthew co-founded Cleartrip which is an online travel company rendering services across the globe.

Matthew was on the Global Advisory Boards of Etihad Airlines and currently sits on the board of DASRA.

== Awards and achievements ==
Year	Title
2001	Awarded international rugby caps for India and playing in the World Cup Qualifiers.
2002	Elected to the Ashoka Fellowship.
2007	Awarded the Member of the Order of the British Empire (MBE) by the Queen of the United Kingdom for services to children in the Commonwealth.
2013	Appointed as an Asia Centre for Social Entrepreneurship and Philanthropy (ACSEP) Fellow from the National University of Singapore
2014	His organisation's Magic Bus has been recognized at the Laureus World Sports Awards.
2014	Magic Bus India won the President's Rashtriya Khel Protsahan award for promotion and development of Sports.
2015	Matthew was awarded Beyond Sport Leadership Award.
2016	His organization Magic Bus won Charity of the year award at the Asian Voice Charity Awards, UK.
2016	Magic Bus won UEFA Foundation for Children Award.
2017	Magic Bus won the Sports Illustrated, Special Award for Services to Sports Award.
2018	Recognized as India's Top educational influencers by Scoo News.
2018	Won the Business Standard Social Entrepreneur of the year.

== Personal life ==
Matthew is married to Ashima Narain with three children. Matthew met Ashima in Mumbai. Ashima is a wildlife photographer and documentary filmmaker. She has shot documentary films titled The Last Dance and In the Pink.

== See also ==
- List of social entrepreneurs
- Non-governmental organisations in India
- Shiv Nadar
- Shaheen Mistri
- Hanumappa Sudarshan
