= Pinni (film) =

2020 short film

- Film poster
- Directed by: Tahira Kashyap
- Written by: Tahira Kashyap
- Produced by: Guneet Monga; Achin Jain; Guneet Dogra
- Starring: Neena Gupta; Shishir Sharma
- Cinematography: Neha Parti Matiyani
- Edited by: Akshara Prabhakar
- Music by: Utkarsh Dhotekar
- Production company: Sikhya Entertainment
- Distributed by: Flipkart Video
- Release date: 19 February 2020
- Running time: 17 minutes
- Country: India
- Language: Hindi

Pinni is a 2020 Indian Hindi-language family drama film written and directed by Tahira Kashyap, which is a Flipkart Video Original. Starring Neena Gupta and Shishir Sharma, this short film is a part of one of the seven segments in the anthology film Zindagi inShort, produced by Guneet Monga's production house Sikhya Entertainment. The film was released on 19 February 2020.

== Plot ==
Sudha (Neena Gupta) is a devoted housewife who loves cooking, especially her signature Pinnis. She lives a fairly normal life, mostly taking care of the household. Her husband (played by Shishir Sharma), rarely ever sits and talks to her, and even takes his tea in the bedroom. Their daughter and other relatives frequently ask her to courier her special Pinnis, which she gladly does. They even make demands, like making the Pinnis gluten-free. One morning, as her husband is hurrying to work, he asks her to pack sugar free Pinnis for him. As she chases him to the cab trying to tell him something, he rushes off without lending an ear. When he returns home in the evening, he finds Sudha dressed up, acting ignorant, and the house is a complete mess. Puzzled by the sudden change, he asks her if he can at least get a cup of tea. She calmly replies with a yes, but only if he sits with her to have it. It's revealed that it's Sudha's birthday today, which he's forgotten. The movie ends with a subtle message of appreciating our mom's role in making our lives sweeter, and giving them the love and undivided attention, they deserve.

== Cast ==
- Neena Gupta
- Shishir Sharma

== Production ==
The director Tahira Kashyap revealed that the film was inspired by the routine of her mother-in-law, Poonam Khurana. Pinni is a short film that revolves around an Indian housewife, who is great at making pinni (Indian sweet dish). The film was shot over three days in Mumbai.

== Reception ==
Pratishruti Ganguly of Firstpost praised Neena Gupta's performance commenting that "Neena's only human interaction is with the help, who does not spare a moment to roll her eyes at Neena's dedication towards her family or belt out a saucy remark at her naivety. But Kashyap's masterstroke to make Neena quiet and shy helps the film from slipping into intense melodrama. Even in her rebellion, it is Neena's dignified quietude that makes the ending so powerful and effective." Nandini Ramanath of Scroll.in wrote "The pacing is uneven and the twist doesn’t quite have the desired result, but Neena Gupta has tremendous fun." Rahul Desai of Film Companion wrote "Pinni is visibly in awe of its lead actor. Much of it is designed to highlight Gupta’s uncanny body language, but the quirky background score and the repetitive framing of domestic routine point to an arc that simply bides its time to reach a striking final shot."
