= TinyStep =

Indian healthcare and parenting network

Tinystep
- Industry: Parenting and Child
- Founded: September 2015
- Founder: Suhail Abidi
- Headquarters: Bangalore, India
- Website: https://www.tinystep.in

Tinystep is Bangalore-based healthcare and parenting network founded by Suhail Abidi in 2015. The app provides information, advice and a network of parents and doctors. The network consists of people in the pregnancy, baby and toddler stages of parenthood.

== Overview ==
The app monitors every stage, from ovulation calculations for pregnancy to the status of pregnancy, regularly, and captures milestones like first step, first laugh, first tooth, first words, etc. Since founding the app has registered more than 600,000 users. The company launched its iOS application in 2017. The company is backed by Flipkart, a Bangalore-based ecommerce website.

== Funding ==
The company received a funding of $2 million from Flipkart.

Mathew Glickman, an ace Silicon Valley investor provided this company with an undisclosed fund.
