= Aage Kya? =

Indian Hindi-language interactive quiz show

- Show poster
- Genre: Game show
- Created by: Indian Storytellers
- Directed by: Utsav Chatterjee
- Starring: Karan Sareen; Devishi Madaan; Vivek Menon; Nishu Tiwari
- Country of origin: India
- Original language: Hindi
- No. of seasons: 1
- No. of episodes: 40

Production
- Production company: Indian Storytellers

Original release
- Release: 28 March 2021

Aage Kya is a 2021 Indian Hindi-language interactive quiz show that aired on Flipkart Video on 28 March 2021. It is an original series of Flipkart Video directed by Utsav Chatterjee and produced under the banner of Indian storytellers. It is a daily game show featuring four social media influencers who are shown funny video clips and asked to present their perspectives. The show also allows viewers to be part of it by asking them three questions and the winners of each episode are awarded prizes by Flipkart.

== Overview ==
Season 1 comprises 40 short episodes and features a panel of four social media influencers, namely Karan, Vivek Menon, Devishi Madan, Nishu Tiwari, who watch three funny video clips alongside the viewers in each episode and give their point of views and have a funny debate on those videos. The episodes are 6–7 minutes in length and in every episode the panelists ask three questions to the viewers and four options are given for each question. The viewers have to select their answer on what they think is going to happen next in the videos. Those who guess all answers correctly are granted prizes by Flipkart at the end of each episode.

== Cast ==
- Karan
- Devishi Madan
- Nishu Tiwari

== Production ==
Flipkart Video announced the show on 25 March 2021 by sharing a poster on its official Twitter revealing Aage Kya casts. A 41-second trailer was subsequently launched on YouTube on 25 March 2021.
