= Power Play with Champions =

Indian cricket game show

- Show poster
- Genre: Game show
- Presented by: Virender Sehwag; Samir Kochhar.
- Country of origin: India
- Original language: Hindi
- No. of seasons: 1
- No. of episodes: 60

Production
- Production location: Mumbai
- Running time: 12 minutes

Original release
- Release: 18 September 2020

Power Play with Champions is an Indian Hindi-language interactive cricket-based quiz show that aired on the Flipkart app on 18 September 2020. It is an original series of Flipkart Video hosted by former Indian cricketer Virender Sehwag and television presenter Samir Kochhar who discuss various aspects of the upcoming matches and present their own perspectives so as to help the viewers predict the correct answers. The show concluded its first season on 16 November 2020 with 60 episodes.

The second season of Power Play with Champions was announced by Flipkart on its official YouTube channel on 7 April 2021 with a trailer and launched on 8 April 2021. This season is also being hosted by Virender and Samir.

== Overview ==
It is a daily game show which will have each new episode based on a match scheduled for the next day. The show host Virender Sehwag and Samir Kochhar provide critical analysis of previous matches and performances of the teams and players who are scheduled to play the next day. Based on this analysis users are provided with 6 questions in a bid to win rewards. The participants are tested on various parameters of the game; they have to answer the questions based on analysis and their own knowledge and skills about the game of cricket.

== Hosts ==
- Virender Sehwag
- Samir Kochhar
