= Ekart =

Indian courier delivery services

- Ekart logo
- Trade name: Smart logistics
- Industry: Courier
- Founded: 2009; 17 years ago
- Founder: Flipkart
- Headquarters: Bangalore, Karnataka, India
- Area served: 15000+ pin codes in India
- Key people: Kalyan Krishnamurthy (CEO) Hemant Badri (Senior Vice President, Head of eKart) Mani Bhushan (Chief Business Officer, eKart)
- Services: Delivery, express mail, third-party logistics
- Website: ekartlogistics.in

Ekart logistics or Ekart courier is an Indian courier delivery services company, headquartered in Bengaluru, Karnataka. A subsidiary of e-commerce company Flipkart, it is run by Instakart services Pvt. Ltd.

== History ==
In January 2014, Ekart, which was originally established as Flipkart's in-house logistics arm, began offering delivery services to third-party e-commerce companies in India. This marked a strategic shift as the company moved beyond handling only Flipkart's shipments. The development was viewed as an effort to position Ekart as a more comprehensive logistics platform in response to the growing demands of India's e-commerce market.

In September 2015, Flipkart Ltd reacquired its logistics unit, Ekart, from WS Retail Services Pvt Ltd, which had been one of the platform's largest sellers. The business was transferred to a newly incorporated subsidiary, Instakart Services Pvt Ltd, as part of a broader corporate restructuring.

Instakart Services, established in June 2015, listed Flipkart executives Ankit Nagori and Rajnish Singh Baweja as directors and shareholders at the time of incorporation. The move was intended to bring Flipkart's logistics operations under closer strategic control.

Following the restructuring, Instakart reportedly received an investment of ₹127 crore from Klick2Shop Logistics Services International, a Singapore-based affiliate of Flipkart.

In November 2016, Instakart Services Pvt Ltd, the Flipkart subsidiary that operates Ekart Logistics, received an equity infusion of ₹1,632.8 crore from Klick2Shop Logistics Services International, a Singapore-based entity associated with Flipkart. In July 2019, Flipkart announced an initiative to transition a portion of its Ekart logistics fleet to electric vehicles (EVs), with a target of converting approximately 40% of its last-mile delivery vans by March 2020. As part of this effort, about 160 electric vans were deployed, and electric bikes were tested in pilot programs across cities including Delhi, Bengaluru, and Hyderabad.

Klick2Shop Logistics Services International, a Singapore-based company, invested Rs.1641 crore in Ekart in October 2017.

In August 2022, Ekart introduced a revised brand identity, including a new logo and updated visual elements such as a simplified color scheme and a stylized letter "e". The rebranding was implemented across packaging, delivery vehicles, uniforms, and other logistics-related assets. This update followed Ekart's earlier initiative in April 2022 to expand its logistics offerings beyond e-commerce to include broader supply chain services.

Between 2021 and 2024, Ekart continued to operate as instakart and reported an eightfold growth in revenue from its supply chain monetisation efforts, according to a Business Standard report. As per the same Business Standard report, Ekart expanded its operations to over 6 million daily shipments and covered approximately 98% of Indian postal codes. The infrastructure included over 50 million cubic feet of warehousing space and a fleet of around 7,000 trucks. Ekart also introduced additional logistics services, including truckload transport, refurbishment, and document delivery. It was reported that a quarter of client brands used multiple services, and a portion of revenue came from end-to-end supply chain contracts.

In the financial year 2023–24, Instakart Services Pvt Ltd, the entity operating Ekart Logistics, reported a net loss of ₹1,718.4 crore, reflecting a more than fivefold increase from ₹324.6 crore recorded in 2022–23. Revenue from operations for the year declined by 5% to ₹12,115.3 crore, compared to ₹12,787.4 crore in the previous fiscal year. Meanwhile, total expenses rose by over 6%, reaching ₹14,149.4 crore. The increase was primarily attributed to higher operational and employee benefit costs. Depreciation, depletion, and amortisation expenses amounted to ₹1,183 crore in FY24, while employee benefit expenses stood at ₹1,244 crore, up from ₹1,204 crore and ₹1,132 crore respectively in FY23.

In March 2025, Ekart partnered with IKEA India to manage last-mile deliveries for furniture and household products ordered through IKEA's online platform. The partnership utilized Ekart's logistics infrastructure, including its fulfillment hub in the Delhi–NCR region, and employed its electric vehicle fleet to support delivery operations. Ekart's role in the collaboration extended to providing logistics services beyond last-mile delivery, including full-truckload (FTL), partial-truckload (PTL) shipments, multi-modal transport, real-time tracking, and warehousing across its network in India.

== See also ==
- Couriers in India
- India Post
