= Click Frenzy =

Australian e-commerce website

Click Frenzy is an Australian e-commerce website and online sales initiative inspired by and based on a similar format to the United States shopping event Cyber Monday. Click Frenzy was founded by parent company Global Marketplace in 2012, and as of 2021 consists of a number of sales held throughout the year.

The inaugural Click Frenzy event was launched on Tuesday, 20 November 2012 with heavy media and online promotion in the lead up, with organisers arranging sales partnerships with many of Australia's leading retailers, and had given multiple assurances prior to the event that they would be able to support the anticipated heavy traffic of the event. However the event's website crashed within moments of launching at 7pm AEST and was unavailable for most of the night, leading to a backlash from frustrated customers.

Despite the inauspicious start, Click Frenzy events continue to be held in the years following, with the event estimating $189 million in sales and the site receiving 1 million visitors in 2014, and 2.4 million visitors in 2017. The traffic to click frenzy’s site doubled in 2020 year-on-year with 1.9 million visits in May 2020 event, which was a 103% increase compared to both the Nov 2019 and May 2019 events. After delivering a record growth in 2020, it's anticipated to break records in 2021. Global Marketplace, owner of Click Frenzy said it's planning for an IPO in 2022.

In late March 2026 the company went into liquidation.

== Overview ==
Click Frenzy generally consists of two major general sales in May and November, branded as Click Frenzy Mayhem and The Main Event (formerly Click Frenzy Go Wild) respectively. Throughout the year minor sales focused on specific categories such as travel or sports are also held on various dates. A sale is also held in the lead up to Valentine's Day.

Consumers are encouraged to visit the Click Frenzy website which centralises deals from Click Frenzy's partners in a single location, though the deals are also available from the partners' own websites.

== History ==
=== Click Frenzy 2012 ===
The inaugural Click Frenzy event was heavily promoted in Australian media including the major television networks and online newspapers. Numerous Australian and international retailers and brands were involved, including Myer, Bing Lee, Microsoft, Toys R Us, Dell, Target and Priceline. Organisers boasted of their preparedness to deal with the expected popularity. "We're expecting up to 1 million site visits [to clickfrenzy.com.au] and we're prepared for this," the spokesperson said. However the site failed almost immediately after the sale period starting. There was a rapid backlash from the Australian public, with trending of the "#clickfail" hashtag on Twitter and creation of various memes mocking the event. Click Frenzy co-founder Grant Arnott appeared on Channel 9's Today Show the next morning expressing disappointment at the website's initial failure.

At the time commentators suggested this incident could further damage the struggling Australian retail sector, and also hurt the credibility of other online product and service providers. Speculation had also been raised that the event was a scam to profit from the collection of users' personal information and premiums paid by participating retailers.

There were mixed responses from the retailers involved. Some reportedly paid up to $33,000 for an advertisement at the site, and considered asking for refunds in the aftermath. However, other retailers such as Windsor Smith, Booktopia, MyDeal.com.au and EzyDVD had been very happy with the increase in sales and traffic that Click Frenzy had driven to their websites. Although the Click Frenzy site itself failed, some consumers bypassed the Click Frenzy site and shopped directly with the retailers involved instead.

In 2017, Arnott claimed that despite the problems, Click Frenzy 2012 had still "generated extraordinary sales for retailers".

In late March 2026 the company went into liquidation. On Wednesday, 1 April its website displayed the message:

“Click Frenzy Pty Ltd (in Liquidation). (Receivers and managers appointed)”.
