= F.Y.I. (2021 TV series) =

Interactive game show

- Show poster
- Genre: Game show
- Created by: Indian Storyteller
- Written by: Kousten Sahu
- Directed by: Ritika Bajaj
- Starring: Jamie Lever
- Country of origin: India
- Original language: Hindi
- No. of seasons: 1

Production
- Production locations: Mumbai, Maharashtra, India

Original release
- Release: 16 January 2021

F.Y.I. is an Indian interactive game show hosted by Jamie Lever, a stand-up comedian and the daughter of Johny Lever. The series is a Flipkart Video original created by Indian Storytellers and directed by Ritika Bajaj. It was released on the Flipkart app on 16 January 2021.

== Format ==
F.Y.I is a Hindi-language daily game show with each episode lasting 3–4 minutes. In every episode, the host asks three questions to the audience and four options are given for each one. These questions are based on pop culture, general knowledge, sports, politics and social media etc. Participants need to answer all three questions correctly to be eligible for the prizes. Winners will be announced at the end of each episode.

== Cast ==
The series marks the web debut of Jamie Lever who is the daughter of comedian and Bollywood actor Johnny Lever. She will be seen playing a journalist who is keen, curious, and consistently "on the chase for the most recent scoop".

== Production ==
The show's launch was announced with a teaser trailer in the mid of January on Flipkart Video's YouTube followed by the official promo which was launched on 15 January 2021.
