= Indiatimes shopping =

Indiatimes Shopping
- Website type: E-commerce (Online shopping)
- Available in: English
- Owner: The Times Group
- Creators: Gautam Sinha, Saurabh Malik, Vivek Pandey
- Commercial: Yes
- Registration: Required
- Launched: 2000; 26 years ago
- Current status: Offline

Indiatimes Shopping is the e-commerce division of The Times of India Group, India's largest media conglomerate. It is one of the pioneers in electronic commerce in India and services its customers through various channels including online and selling over the phone. It also provided platform services for brands to go online and sell their products in partnership through White-label. Some of the major categories sold through Indiatimes Shopping included men & women footwear, apparel & accessories, lifestyle, home décor, mobile phones, consumer electronics, health & personal beauty products, books, jewellery, baby products and flowers & gifts. Indiatimes Shopping operated through a hybrid model, an mix of warehousing and marketplace.

== Business model ==
Indiatimes Shopping initiated its operation in the year 2000, being one of the earliest e-commerce companies in India. It has various business models.

=== E-tailing ===
Indiatimes Shopping sold a range of products online including footwear, apparel, mobile phones, consumer electronics, computers & accessories, flowers & gifts, home décor items, books and a lot more. Customers had the option of paying through credit card, debit card, netbanking and cash on delivery.

== Key people ==
Gautam Sinha is the Chief Operating Officer of Times Internet Limited. Saurabh Malik is the Business Head of Indiatimes Shopping, Amit Bhatia is Head of Marketing and Vivek Pandey heads Product and Technology.

== Location ==
The company's headquarters is located in Gurgaon's Udyog Vihar area near Delhi-Gurgaon highway. It has offices and customer service centers across India, including Noida, Jaipur, Bangalore, Mumbai and Delhi. Indiatimes Shopping's warehouses are located in Daryaganj and Dwarka, Delhi.

Indiatimes Shopping uses in-house ecommerce technology platform that can handle complex e-commerce execution requirements related to Business, Logistics, Finance, Marketing & Content.

== mCommerce ==
The mobile app of shopping.indiatimes.com was officially launched in the year 2012 on Android and iOS. The mobile version of the site was launched in October 2014.

== See also ==
- Ecommerce in India
- Online shopping
