= Jabong.com =

Indian fashion and lifestyle e-commerce portal

- Website type: E-commerce
- Founded: 2012; 14 years ago
- Headquarters: Sector 18, Gurugram, Haryana, India
- Area served: India
- Founder: Manu Kumar Jain
- Parent: Flipkart
- Commercial: Yes
- Current status: Defunct since February 2020; 6 years ago

Jabong.com was an Indian fashion and lifestyle e-commerce portal founded by Praveen Sinha, Lakshmi Potluri, Arun Chandra Mohan, Manu Kumar Jain and Mukul Bafana. In July, 2016 Flipkart acquired Jabong through its unit Myntra for about $70 million. In February 2020, Flipkart formally shut down Jabong to shift focus completely on its premium clothing platform Myntra. The portal sold apparel, footwear, fashion accessories, beauty products, fragrances, home accessories and other fashion and lifestyle products. The company's headquarter was in Gurugram, NCR, India.

== History ==
It was co-founded by Arun Chandra Mohan, Praveen Sinha, Lakshmi Potluri, Manu Kumar Jain and Mukul Bafana. All co-founders have left the company.

In March 2013, Jabong was dispatching over 6,000 orders a day. According to The Economist, Jabong clocked gross sales of around US$100–150 Million in 2012.

As per a Rocket Internet investor presentation, Jabong had a net revenue of 32.6 million euros in Q1 2016, up 14% from 28.6 million euros in the year-ago period. For FY2015, its revenues were at 122.1 million euros In September 2017, It was reported that Jabong is the 3rd largest global e-commerce partner for Dorothy Perkins.

Jabong to launch technology lab for bigger innovations in Jan 2015. CEO of Jabong, Praveen Sinha quoted, "The main focus of the lab is to innovate and focus on a lot of features using information technology and create a centre which focuses more on innovations three or five years ahead of what we’re doing today."

== Profile ==
Jabong sold shoes, apparel, accessories, home décor and furniture, with over 1000 brands and over 90,000 products. Other products include jewellery and gold coins.

== Marketing campaigns ==
The company launched its first TV campaign in March 2012. Other television campaigns appeared in September 2012 and during 2013 Jabong.

In November 2013, Jabong, together with Puma, launched the digital fitness campaign “Gear up Buddy” with Bollywood actor Chitrangada Singh.

Jabong.com launched the India Online Fashion Week in 2014. The event was described as a platform for young and aspiring designers, stylists, models and photographers, who were mentored by fashion industry experts including celebrity mentor Yami Gautam.

Jabong.com launched a monthly fashion magazine "The Juice" in April, 2014. The magazine covers stories and features around fashion, beauty, people, trends, travel and pop culture.

== Partnerships ==
In May 2013, Jabong presented a fashion collection based on the Bollywood movie Yeh Jawaani Hai Deewani. Jabong showcased the fashion apparel used in the movie by the movie stars.

In November 2012, Jabong.com and cricket equipment maker SG Cricket presented a range of Virender Sehwag cricket bats.

In July 2013, Jabong associated with Bollywood again through the movie Bhaag Milkha Bhaag and offered a collection inspired by the movie.

In October 2014, it was reported that Amazon was in the initial talks to acquire Jabong, but no take-over deal happened and none of the parties confirmed the reasons.

In July 2016, Jabong was acquired by Myntra, a subsidiary of Flipkart for an undisclosed amount. The merge has led to over 150 employees being laid off, as part of the process towards the integration of the two businesses' functions.

During the 2014–15 Indian Super League season, Jabong became the main shirt sponsor of Mumbai based professional soccer club Mumbai City FC.

== Online traffic ==
According to a ComScore report of September 2012, Jabong.com had the second highest amount of traffic on its website, among Indian e-commerce websites, within a few months of its launch. In November 2013, Jabong.com held an Alexa Traffic ranking of 37 in India. Jabong also ranked 10th in Google Zeitgeist India trends making it the 10th most searched term in 2012 in India.

Flipkart owned Jabong fashion portal was shut down completely in Feb 2020 and Jabong website users are redirected to Myntra website permanently.

== International store ==
Jabong also had an international online shopping store called Jabongworld.com, which receives its highest amount of traffic from the United States, closely followed by Malaysia and Mauritius among other countries.

Jabongworld.com was shut down in mid-2016.

== Awards and recognition ==
According to The Brand Trust Report India Study - 2013 by Trust Research Advisory, Jabong ranked among the top 25 trusted Online brands in India.

Year	Association	Category	Nominee(s)	Result
2017	Diversity in Media Awards	Marketing Campaign of the Year	Be You	Nominated
