= Home Shop 18 =

Indian home shopping television channel

HomeShop18
- Website type: E-commerce (Online shopping)
- Available in: Hindi
- Owner: Skyblue Buildwell Pvt. Ltd.
- Creator: HomeShop
- Key people: Manish Kalra
- Commercial: Yes
- Registration: Required
- Launched: 9 April 2008; 18 years ago
- Current status: Defunct

HomeShop18 was an Indian online and on-air shopping channel. It was previously owned by the Network 18 Group division of Reliance Industries. It was closed on 24 May 2019 and sold to Skyblue Buildwell Pvt. Ltd.

== Investors ==
GS Home Shopping of South Korea, the third-largest and dominant home shopping company in the e-commerce market, has a 1.89% stake in the company. Skyblue Buildwell Pvt. Ltd. has the controlling stake of 16%.

== Television channel ==
The HomeShop18 television channel was launched on 9 April 2008. The television network can be currently seen on cable, satellite and some terrestrial channels in India.

It also became the country's first ever 24/7 home shopping channel to be available on DD Free Dish reach, a free-to-air direct-to-home (DTH) broadcasting platform of Prasar Bharati. The channel was made available from 1 November 2015.

== Acquisitions ==
HomeShop18 previously acquired two companies, namely, Coinjoos.com and Shop CJ Network. Coinjoos was acquired in 2011 and Shop CJ Network was acquired in 2017. Coinjoos was an online music and books retailer and Shop CJ Network was a home shopping channel.

== Carriage ==
HomeShop18 TV channel is available to all cable operators & leading DTH players except DishTV: Tata Sky-151, Reliance- 219, Airtel- 112, DD Free Dish-45.
