= Flipkart =

Indian e-commerce company

- Type: Subsidiary
- Industry: E-commerce
- Founded: 22 October 2007; 19 years ago
- Founders: Sachin Bansal; Binny Bansal
- Headquarters: Bengaluru, Karnataka, India
- Area served: India
- Key people: Kalyan Krishnamurthy (CEO)
- Services: Online shopping
- Revenue: ▲₹82,787 crore (US$8.8 billion) (2025)
- Net income: ▼₹−5,189 crore (US$−550 million) (2025)
- Number of employees: 22,000 (excluding Myntra) (January 2024)
- Parent: Walmart (~85%)
- Subsidiaries: Cleartrip; Ekart; Flipkart Wholesale; Myntra; Shopsy; Super Money
- Website: flipkart.com
- Footnotes; Financials as of 31 March 2025.

Flipkart Internet Private Limited is an Indian e-commerce company, headquartered in Bengaluru. The company initially focused on online book sales before expanding into other product categories such as consumer electronics, fashion, home essentials, groceries, and lifestyle products. Since 2018, Walmart has held a controlling stake in the company.

According to a 2023 AllianceBernstein report, Flipkart held a 48% market share in the Indian e-commerce industry, in which it competes primarily with Amazon India and domestic rival Meesho. In 2018, Flipkart was described as having a dominant position in the apparel segment, bolstered by its acquisition of Myntra, and as being "neck and neck" with Amazon in the sale of electronics and mobile phones.

== History ==
=== 2007–2010 ===
Flipkart was founded in October 2007 in Bengaluru by Sachin Bansal and Binny Bansal, alumni of the IIT Delhi and former Amazon employees. The company was started from a two-bedroom apartment in Koramangala, Bengaluru, with an initial investment of ₹200,000 from each of the founders' families. The website was launched in October 2007, initially only limited to selling books. Flipkart was reportedly receiving 100 orders per day by 2008.

In 2010, Flipkart acquired WeRead, a digital retailer of books, from Lulu.com. This space was otherwise only shared by very limited number of players at that time in the market, such as Landmark and Infibeam. WeRead continued to operate independently after the acquisition.

=== 2011–2014 ===
In 2011, Flipkart acquired the digital distribution business Mime360.com, a distributor of music, media and games, and the digital content library of the Bollywood portal Chakpak. Following the latter acquisition, Flipkart launched its DRM-free Digital music store Flyte in 2012. Due to competition from free streaming sites, Flyte was unsuccessful and shut down in June 2013.

In 2012, Flipkart acquired Letsbuy, an online electronics retailer. In 2013, Flipkart co-founders sold WS Retail to a consortium of investors led by Rajeev Kuchhal.

In 2014, Flipkart was the exclusive Indian retailer of several smartphones, including the Moto G, the Moto E, the Xiaomi Mi 3, and the Redmi 1S and Redmi Note. Flipkart acquired Myntra, an online fashion retailer, for US$280 million in May 2014. As of 2018, Myntra continues to operate alongside Flipkart as a standalone subsidiary focusing on separate market segments.

On 6 October 2014, coinciding with the company's anniversary and the Diwali season, Flipkart held a major sale that it promoted as "Big Billion Day". The event generated a surge of traffic, selling US$100 million worth of goods in 10 hours. The event received criticism via social media over technical issues experienced during the event and stock shortages.

In 2014, Flipkart invested in mobile payments platform Ngpay and shuttered its own payment platform Payzippy by merging it with Ngpay.

=== 2015–2018 ===
In April 2015, Flipkart acquired Appiterate, a Delhi-based mobile marketing automation firm. In October 2015, Flipkart reprised the "Big Billion Day" sale as a multi-day event known as "Big Billion Days", which would be exclusive to the Flipkart mobile app. Flipkart bolstered its supply chain and introduced more fulfillment centers to meet customer demand. Flipkart achieved a gross merchandise volume of US$300 million during the event, with the largest volumes coming from fashion sales and the largest value coming from mobiles.

In December 2015, Flipkart purchased a 34% stake in the digital mapping provider MapmyIndia for around ₹1,600 crore ($260 million). In April 2016, Flipkart acquired the UPI mobile payments startup PhonePe. In July 2016, Flipkart acquired the online fashion retailer Jabong.com from Rocket Internet for US$70 million. In January 2017, Flipkart made a US$2 million investment in TinyStep, a parenting information startup.

In 2017, Flipkart sold 1.3 million phones in 20 hours on 21 September during its Big Billion Days promotion, doubling the number sold on the first day of the same event in 2016. Flipkart held a 51% share of all Indian smartphone shipments in 2017, overtaking Amazon India (33%).

In April 2017, EBay announced that it would sell its Indian subsidiary, eBay.in, to Flipkart, and invest US$500 million in the company. While eBay suggested that the partnership would allow Flipkart to access eBay's network of international vendors, these plans never came to fruition. In July 2017, Flipkart made an offer to acquire its main domestic competitor, Snapdeal, for US$800–900 million, but the offer was rejected by Snapdeal's board.

==== Acquisition by Walmart ====
On 4 May 2018, it was reported that American retail corporation Walmart had won a bidding war with Amazon to acquire a majority stake in Flipkart for US$15 billion. On 9 May 2018, Walmart officially announced its intent to acquire a 77% controlling stake in Flipkart for US$16 billion. Following the purchase, Flipkart co-founder Sachin Bansal left the company. The remaining management team reported to Marc Lore, CEO of Walmart eCommerce US. Walmart president Doug McMillon cited plans to help Flipkart with its sourcing and supply chain. Indian traders protested against the acquisition, considering it a threat to domestic businesses.

In a filing with the U.S. Securities and Exchange Commission on 11 May 2018, Walmart stated that Flipkart's current minority shareholders "may require Flipkart to effect an initial public offering following the fourth anniversary of the closing of the transactions at a valuation no less than that paid by Walmart".

Following the announcement of Walmart's deal, EBay announced that it would sell its stake in Flipkart back to the company for US$1.1 billion and relaunch its Indian operations, citing "a huge growth potential for e-commerce in India." SoftBank Group also sold its entire 20% stake to Walmart without disclosing the terms of the sale. Walmart's acquisition of a 77% stake in Flipkart was completed on 18 August 2018. Walmart also provided US$2 billion in equity funding to the company.

On 13 November 2018, Flipkart CEO Binny Bansal resigned after facing an allegation of "serious personal misconduct". Walmart stated that "while the investigation did not find evidence to corroborate the complainant's assertions against Binny, it did reveal other lapses in judgment, particularly a lack of transparency, related to how Binny responded to the situation." Days later, Walmart increased its equity stake in Flipkart to 81.3%.

=== 2019–2022 ===
In July 2019, Flipkart launched Samarth program that supported local artisans, weavers, and craftspersons that traditionally are only able to sell locally. Flipkart invested US$4 million in the customer engagement and rewards platform EasyRewardz in November 2019.

In 2020, Flipkart launched Flipkart Wholesale, an online marketplace that provided a digital platform for kiranas and MSMEs. As a part of the same initiative around Flipkart Wholesale, Flipkart also acquired 100% stake in Walmart India Private Limited operating Best Price cash-and-carry business.

In July 2020, Flipkart acquired a 27% stake in Arvind Fashions's newly formed subsidiary Arvind Youth Brands for US$35 million. Arvind Youth Brands owned the Flying Machine brand. Flipkart also rolled out Flipkart Quick, a hyperlocal 90-minute delivery service for product categories such as groceries, home accessories, mobile phones, and stationery.

In October 2020, Flipkart acquired a 7.8% stake in Aditya Birla Fashion and Retail for US$204 million. The following month, Flipkart acquired the intellectual property of gaming startup Mech Mocha for an undisclosed amount. In November 2020, Flipkart acquired augmented reality company Scapic.

In April 2021, Flipkart announced the acquisition of the travel booking portal Cleartrip. Flipkart also launched Flipkart Hotels using Cleartrip API. In 2022, Flipkart sold Cleartrip's business in the Middle East, including the website Flyin.com, to Wego.

In July 2021, Flipkart launched its social commerce marketplace called Shopsy, which allowed individuals and small businesses to direct sell and resell products to customers via social media channels. In December 2021, Shopsy entered the grocery delivery segment in 700 cities across India.

In November 2021, Flipkart Health acquired Sastasundar Healthbuddy for an undisclosed sum. In April 2022, Flipkart started the Flipkart Health+ app for delivering medicines and health services through Sastasundar Marketplace Limited, which was already providing online pharmacy services. This partnership with Sastasundar ended in January 2025.

In April 2022, Flipkart Group established its philanthropic arm, Flipkart Foundation, to support entrepreneurship among underserved communities in India. The same month, Flipkart introduced the Flipkart Labs programme to develop Web3 and Metaverse use cases in shopping.

In December 2022, Flipkart completed its spin-off of PhonePe, with Flipkart's shareholders receiving direct ownership stakes in the latter. As a result of PhonePe's separation, Flipkart announced a cash payout of around $700 million to its former and current employees holding Flipkart's ESOPs.

=== 2023–present ===
On 22 December 2023, Flipkart confirmed that US$600 million would be infused by Walmart as part of its total fundraising plan of US$1 billion. The funding round was expected to value the company at about 5-10% higher than its previous valuation of US$33 billion, implying a valuation of roughly US$34.7 billion to US$36.3 billion.

Binny Bansal resigned from the executive team on 28 January 2024, and subsequently divested his remaining stake in the company to Walmart.

In March 2024, Flipkart launched its UPI services, Flipkart UPI, in partnership with Axis Bank.

==== Flipkart Minutes ====
In August 2024, Flipkart entered the quick-commerce market with the introduction of Flipkart Minutes. In the same month, Flipkart-backed super.money launched its mobile application offering credit-first UPI services. In October 2024, Flipkart was among the initial partners in the launch of YouTube's Shopping affiliate programme in India, allowing eligible video creators to link products from Flipkart and Myntra, in their content. In 2025, the company announced that it would shift its domicile from Singapore to India. On 11 September 2026, Flipkart Minutes expanded its operational footprint to approximately 1,200 micro-fulfillment centers spanning over 150 cities.

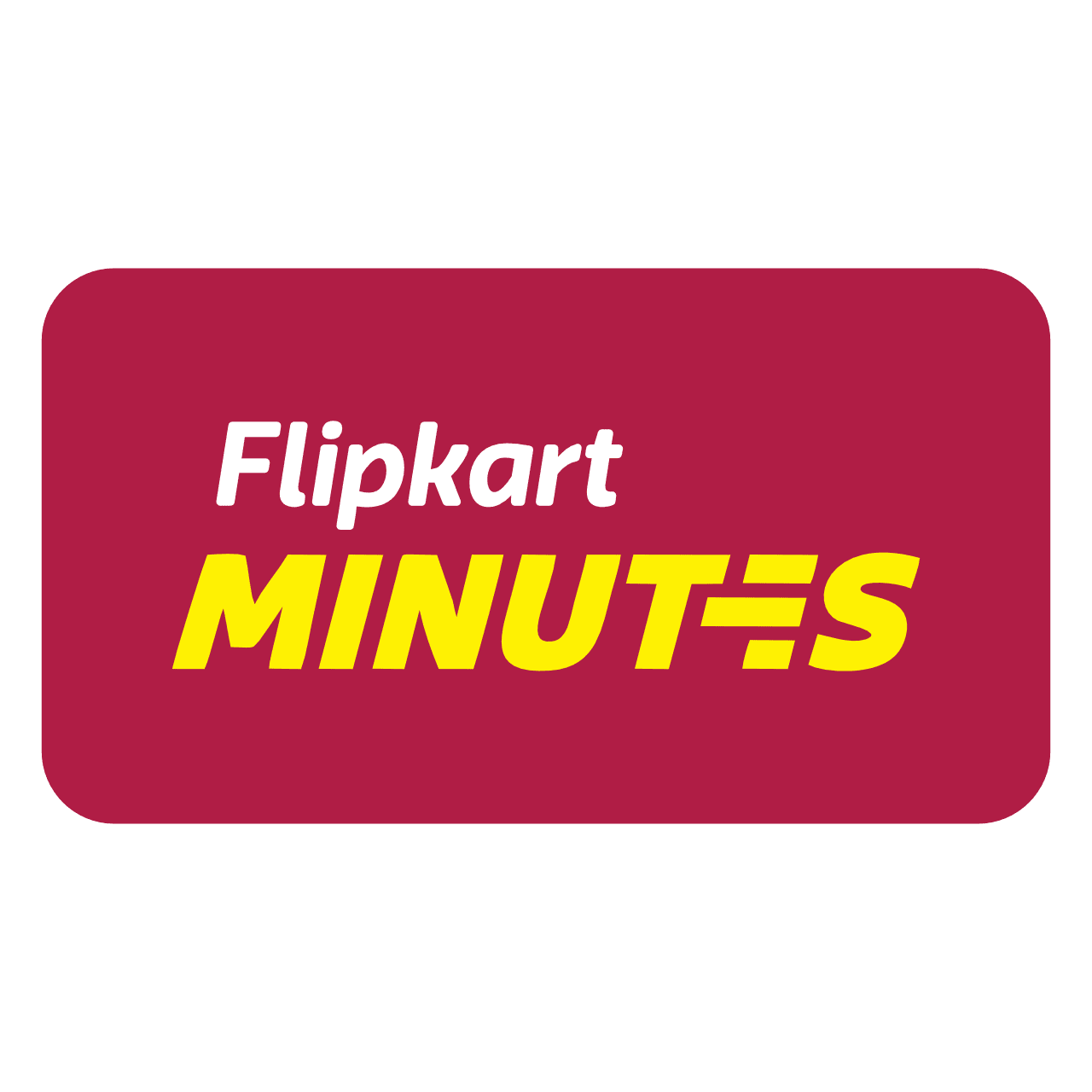
Flipkart Minutes logo

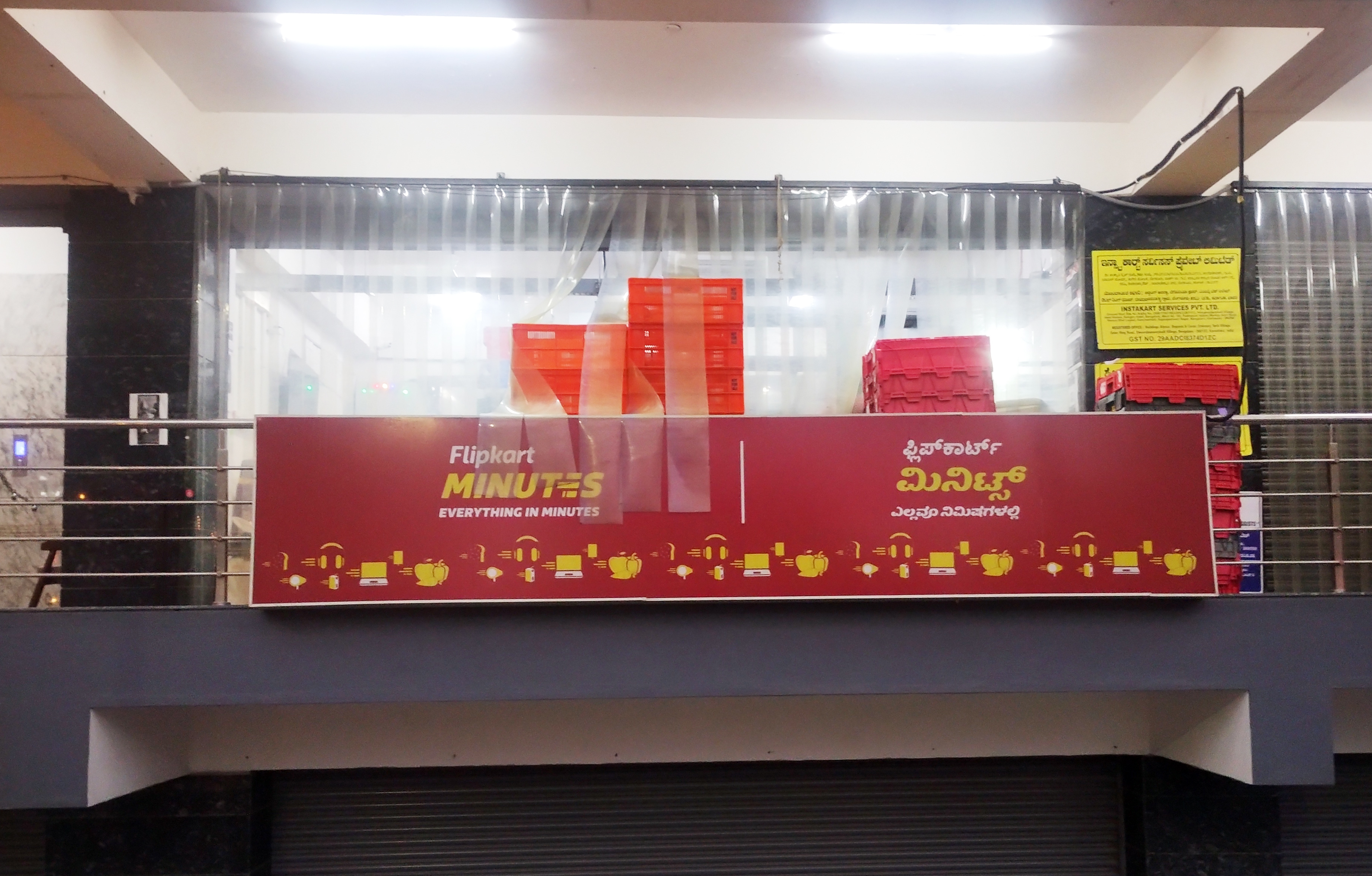
A Flipkart minutes store at RR Nagar, Bangalore (2026)

Bag of Flipkart Minutes (2026)

== Business structure ==
According to a report in November 2014, Flipkart operated with a complex business structure that included nine firms, some registered in Singapore and some in India. Flipkart's Indian entities are owned by Flipkart Pvt. Ltd., which is registered in Singapore. The Singapore-registered entity owns eight Indian companies, including Flipkart Internet Pvt. Ltd, the company that runs the e-commerce marketplace Flipkart.com, Flipkart India Pvt. Ltd, the wholesale business, and Flipkart Logistics Pvt. Ltd, which runs Ekart (the internal logistics arm that can be used by other e-commerce players).

Notable companies in which Flipkart Group owns a controlling stake include:

Name	Type	Since	Current stake
Myntra	Fashion	2014	100%
Ekart	Logistics	2015	
Flipkart Wholesale	B2B cash and carry	2020	100%
Cleartrip	Travel booking	2021	80%
Shopsy	B2C e-commerce	2021	100%
Flipkart Health+	Healthcare	2021	75.1%
Super.money	Fintech / Payments	2024	100%

Flipkart has made 22 acquisitions and 27 investments, spending over US$415 million for the acquisitions.

As of 2021, the Flipkart app was available in 8 local Indian languages, Gujarati, Bengali, Odia, Hindi, Telugu, Kannada, Marathi and Tamil. As of 2022, Flipkart reportedly hosted 1.1 million sellers.

== Funding and revenue ==
The initial development budget of Flipkart was ₹400,000 (US$4,300). It later raised funding from venture capital firms Accel India (receiving US$1 million in funding in 2009) and Tiger Global (US$10 million in 2010 and US$20 million in June 2011). On 24 August 2012, Flipkart announced the completion of its 4th round of funding, netting a total of US$150 million from MIH (part of the Naspers Group) and Iconiq Capital. The company announced on 10 July 2013 that it had raised an additional US$200 million from existing investors, including Tiger Global, Naspers, Accel Partners, and Iconiq Capital.

Flipkart's reported sales were ₹40 million (US$430,000) in the FY2008–09, ₹200 million (US$2.1 million) in the FY2009–10 and ₹750 million (US$8.0 million) in the FY2010–11.

Flipkart reported a loss of ₹2.81 billion (US$30 million) for the FY2012–13. In July 2013, Flipkart raised US$160 million from private equity investors.

In October 2013, it was reported that Flipkart had raised an additional US$160 million from new investors Dragoneer Investment Group, Morgan Stanley Wealth Management, Sofina SA, and Vulcan Inc., with a share of the funding coming from existing investor Tiger Global.

On 26 May 2014, Flipkart announced that it had raised US$210 million from Yuri Milner's DST Global and its existing investors Tiger Global, Naspers, and Iconiq Capital.

On 29 July 2014, Flipkart announced that it raised US$1 billion from Tiger Global, Accel Partners, Morgan Stanley Investment Management, and a new investor, Singaporean sovereign wealth fund GIC.

In December 2014, it received US$700 million in another round of funding at a valuation of US$11 billion. At the same time, Flipkart announced its filing application with the Singapore-based company regulator ACRA to become a public company. In May 2015, Flipkart raised US$550 million in additional funding from its existing investors at a valuation of US$15 billion.

By August 2015, after raising another US$700 million, Flipkart had raised a total of US$3 billion over 12 rounds of funding from 16 major investors. In April 2017, Flipkart underwent another round of funding, receiving US$1.4 billion in funding from investors including EBay, Microsoft, and Tencent. On 10 August 2017, SoftBank Vision Fund invested another US$2.5 billion in Flipkart.

In 2022, the company started Flipkart Ventures and created a Venture capital of $100 million to be invested in other startups selected for its startup accelerator program.

The total revenue in 2022 was that of ₹43,357 crore was reported for the past fiscal year of 2020–21, which was 25% more than its revenue in the previous year. The losses were reported to have reduced by 23% to ₹2,445 crore.

In May 2024, Google invested $350 million in Flipkart.

== Regulatory action and lawsuits ==
In November 2012, the Indian Enforcement Directorate launched an investigation into Flipkart for alleged violations of the foreign direct investment regulations of the Foreign Exchange Management Act, 1999. On 30 November 2012, Flipkart's offices were raided by the Enforcement Directorate, with documents and computer hard drives seized by inspectors. In August 2014, the Enforcement Directorate claimed that it had found Flipkart to be in violation of the Foreign Exchange Management Act. The Delhi High Court declared that several e-commerce firms, including Flipkart, had violated foreign investment regulations.

In January 2016, a public interest litigation hearing took place over Flipkart's alleged contravention of foreign investment norms. The court asked the Reserve Bank of India to provide the latest circular on foreign investment policy. The same month, the Department of Industrial Policy and Promotion (DIPP) clarified that it did not recognise the marketplace model of online retail. In February 2016, Health Minister J. P. Nadda announced that the Maharashtra FDA had taken action against Flipkart, among others, for selling drugs without a valid license.

== Consumer affairs ==
In 2022, a group of scammers was arrested by the Lucknow Police for cheating Flipkart by ordering Apple products and returning packages with bricks instead. Such scams have also been reported in the past, where soaps were delivered instead of an iPhone, not only via Flipkart but also via Amazon.

== Flipkart Video ==
Flipkart Video
- Company type: Private
- Website type: Video streaming
- Available in: Hindi
- Dissolved: July 2023; 3 years ago
- Headquarters: Bangalore
- Area served: India
- Industry: Entertainment
- Registration: Required
- Launched: August 2019; 7 years ago
- Current status: Discontinued

Flipkart Video was an India-based OTT (Over the Top) video streaming platform operated by Flipkart. It was launched in 2019, and formed content partnerships with Voot, Arre, Viu, TVF, and Pocket Aces' Dice Media. In October 2019, it announced its first original series Back Benchers, a quiz show hosted by Bollywood film producer and director Farah Khan, which featured Bollywood actors as students and host Farah as the dean of the figurative school. The show had appearances from Bollywood actors such as Anil Kapoor, Shilpa Shetty, Kartik Aaryan, Parineeti Chopra, Ananya Panday, Bhumi Pednekar, Taapsee Pannu, Janhvi Kapoor, and Malaika Arora.

Flipkart Video is a free video streaming service that is available within the video section of the Flipkart app. Flipkart has cooperated with various production houses, including Studio Next and Frames, as well as Sikhya Productions, to offer its library of original series in foreign languages and genres to Flipkart users.

=== Flipkart Video Original programming ===
Flipkart Video Originals features programming in several genres, including action, comedy, romance, drama, horror, adventure, and others.

==== Original series ====
Year	Title	Episodes	Genre	Premiere	Length	Language	Ref(s)
2019	Back Benchers	20	Quiz show	19 October 2019	35 mins	Hindi	
2020	Entertainer No.1	8	Game show	13 April 2020	10 mins	Hindi	
2020	Kya Bolti Public	30	Game show	16 April 2020	10 mins	Hindi	
2020	Fake or Not	30	Quiz show	6 July 2020	10 mins	Hindi	
2020	Super Fan		Game show	10 July 2020	12 mins	Hindi	
2020	Power Play with Champions	60	Quiz show	18 September 2020	12 mins	Hindi	
2020	Sabse Funny Kaun		Comedy	28 September 2020	10 mins	Hindi	
2020	Ladies vs Gentlemen	30	Game show	18 November 2020	20 mins	Hindi	
2020	Prize Wali Paathshala		Game show	15 December 2020	7 mins	Hindi	
2021	Kaun? Who Did It?	35	Crime	9 January 2021	17 mins	Hindi	
2021	F.Y.I.		Game show	16 January 2021		Hindi	
2021	Dating Aaj Kal	30	Game show	13 February 2021	18 mins	Hindi	
2021	Aage Kya?	40	Quiz show	28 March 2021		Hindi	

==== Original short films ====
Year	Title	Topic/Genre	Premiere	Length	Language	Ref(s)
2020	Chhaju Ke Dahi Bhalle	Online Dating	19 February 2020	13 mins	Hindi	
2020	Nano So Phobia	Confusion of Old Age	19 February 2020	12 mins	Hindi	
2020	Sleeping Partner	Marital Rape	19 February 2020	22 mins	Hindi	
2020	Pinni	The Role of a mother in making our lives sweeter	19 February 2020	17 mins	Hindi	
2020	Sunny Side Upar	Looking at the positive sides in Life	19 February 2020	18 mins	Hindi	
2020	Swaaha	Infidelity in a marriage	19 February 2020	16 mins	Hindi	
2020	Thappad	Innocence of childhood	19 February 2020	17 mins	Hindi	

== Criticism ==
On 13 September 2014, a Flipkart deliveryman allegedly molested a housemaid in Hyderabad. The housemaid's employer sued Flipkart for this incident, citing the need for regulations to make offline delivery services safer.

In 2014, competitors such as Future Group (owner of retail chain Big Bazaar at that time) filed complaints with India's Ministry of Commerce and Industry, alleging that Flipkart's Big Billion Days discounts undercut prices in a manner predatory to other retailers. The ministry stated that it would look into the complaints.

In April 2015, Flipkart faced criticism for being a launch partner in the Airtel Zero program. Critics alleged that the zero-rating scheme violated the principles of net neutrality. Flipkart later pulled out of the project.

In 2015, around 400 delivery executives working with eKart, the logistics arm of Flipkart, went on strike to protest poor working conditions. Complaints included seven-day workweeks, extended hours, and a lack of clean toilets and medical assistance for bike riders involved in accidents. In 2016, delivery executive Nanjunda Swamy was allegedly murdered by a customer who did not have enough money to pay for a product. In response, Flipkart launched a safety initiative -'Project Nanjunda', named after the deceased executive. This included an SOS button in the mobile app (called the Nanjunda button) that could be used by field executives in case of emergencies.

Vendors on Flipkart have faced several challenges while doing business on the company's marketplace, to the extent that some of them have quit the portal. Some of these challenges include Flipkart's alleged unfair policies towards sellers, the lack of a competent logistics service, and customer returns that are a result of consumer fraud.

== Awards and recognition ==
- Flipkart was reported to be at the top in the annual Fairwork India Ratings 2021 - which is a 10-point system that creates a score based on fair pay, conditions, contracts, management, and representation. A total of 11 platforms were evaluated by a consortium of the Centre for IT and Public Policy (CITAPP), International IIIT Bangalore and the global Fairwork network. The methodology included qualitative interviews with 19-20 workers in Delhi and Bangalore.

== See also ==
- E-commerce in India
- Online shopping
