= Raghav Bahl =

Indian businessman, founder of Network18

- Education: St. Stephen's College, Delhi; FMS, Delhi; Delhi University
- Occupation: Businessman
- Known for: Founder & former MD, Network18 Group; Founder, Quintillion Media
- Spouse: Ritu Kapur
- Children: Tara Bahl, Vidur Bahl

Raghav Bahl is an Indian businessman, a serial entrepreneur, and an investor best known for his past ownership of several television channels, including TV18 India. He was the Founding/Controlling shareholder & managing director of Network18 Group, a media group that he started in 1993 and grew into one of the largest collection of media properties in India.

At its peak, the group controlled by Raghav Bahl included media and internet-based media outlets such as in.com, IBNLive.com, Moneycontrol.com, Firstpost.com, Cricketnext, Homeshop18, bookmyshow.com, Forbes India, TV channels such as Colors and some in partnership with international media groups such as NBC TV18, CNN-IBN, IBN7, MTV, and CNBC Awaaz.

By late 2011, according to a LiveMint article, Bahl's media group had a large debt, was running in loss and banks were unwilling to lend the group additional capital. Bahl's group sought capital from the Reliance Industries Ltd in 2012, and two years later Reliance took over the media empire and Bahl left the Network18 group on 29 May 2014.

After departing from the Network18 group, Bahl co-founded Quintillion Media Pvt Ltd with his wife Ritu Kapur. Currently, Bahl is the promoter of Quint Digital Media Limited and his media group controls Thequint.com. Bahl entered a joint venture agreement with Bloomberg L.P. to launch BloombergQuint in 2016, the equity partnership ended in 2022.

== Early life ==
He received his schooling from St. Xavier's School, Delhi. He graduated in Economics Honors from St. Stephens College, and then earned a master's degree in Business Administration from the Faculty of Management Studies.

His sister, Vandana Malik, also served in various positions under the Network18 Group. Her daughter and Bahl's niece, Avantika Malik, was married to Bollywood actor Imran Khan.

== Career ==
He began his career as a management consultant with A.F. Ferguson & Co, followed by a stint with American Express Bank, and later moved on to media.

He started his career in media in 1985 as a Correspondent and Anchorperson for Doordarshan. He was the Anchorperson and Production Consultant for India's first monthly video news magazine, Newstrack, produced by the India Today group. From 1991 to 1993, he was the executive director of Business India Television and produced the Business India Show and Business A.M. on Doordarshan.

In 1999, he launched CNBC-TV18. He was responsible for directing most of the work of TV18 and channels like CNBC-Awaaz, Nickelodeon and Colors. Raghav served as the managing director of TV18 Group till July 2014.

By late 2011, Bahl's media group had amassed a large debt, was running in loss and banks were unwilling to lend the group additional capital. Bahl's group sought capital from the Reliance Industries Ltd in 2012. Bahl then brought the losses in his group under control, laid off hundreds of employees in his media group, closed or trimmed many of the properties within the group, according to the LiveMint.

Two years later, in 2014, under the terms of this financing agreement, Reliance took over the Network18 group. With the change in ownership, Bahl left the Network18 Group in 2014.

After leaving the Network18 Group, he founded Quintillion Media, a digital startup that publishes The Quint, along with his wife Ritu Kapur on 8 July 2014.

== Writing ==
He has authored three books:

- Super Power? The Amazing Race Between China's Hare and India's Tortoise (Penguin, 2012)
- SuperEconomies: America, India, China, and the Future of the World (Penguin, 2016)
- Super Century: What India Must Do to Rise by 2050 (Penguin, 2019)

== Awards ==
- In 1994, the World Economic Forum called Raghav a Global Leader of Tomorrow, and he won India's Sanskriti Award for Journalism.
- In 2007, he was named Ernst & Young's Entrepreneur of the Year for Business Transformation.
- In 2008, he won the Indian Telly Award for Lifetime Contribution to Indian Television.
- In 2011, he won the All India Management Association's Media Person of the Year award, as well as the Bombay Management Association's prize for Entrepreneur of the Year.
- In 2017, he won the ISOMES SAMMAN by BAG Network24's in their Media Fest "MANTHAN".

== Controversy ==
- The Income tax department had raided Bahl's premises in Noida in October 2018 on charges of "bogus long term capital gains (LTCG) received by various beneficiaries" and other charges of tax evasion. Bahl provided his statement in October 2018 on the baseless allegations/ charges pursuant to which the IT raids were conducted.
- Bahl had allegedly made ₹1.14 billion out of an investment of ₹30.3 million made in a penny stock company called PMC Fincorp that was promoted by a certain Raj Kumar Modi in 2011. Raj Kumar Modi is managing director of PMC Fincorp. In this regard, Bahl had filed a settlement application with the Securities and Exchange Board of India in relation to the alleged violation of the applicable SEBI regulations. In accordance with the applicable regulatory framework, Bahl vide order dated July 13, 2021, without admitting the findings of SEBI, settled the proceedings under the SEBI (Settlement Proceedings) Regulations, 2018.
- ED initiated a preliminary inquiry against Bahl regarding a case of alleged Money Laundering. Bahl vide letter dated June 8, 2019 to Mrs. Nirmala Sitharaman, the Finance Minister of India, had clarified that the full details in relation to the preliminary inquiry in the alleged Money Laundering case had been duly submitted to the authorities and that there was no wrongdoing on his part.
- Bahl had filed a petition with the Delhi High Court [W.P.(CRL) 2392/2021 & CRL.M.A. 19314-19316/2021] seeking quashing of the inquiry being undertaken by the ED. The Delhi High Court vide its order dated December 3, 2021 noted that “it has been submitted on behalf of the petitioner that in as much as the predicate offence does not exist, the proceedings in relation to the investigation being conducted by the Enforcement of Directorate cannot continue”. Mukul Rohatgi appearing on behalf of Bahl submitted, “I have told them that black money proceedings are pending in the Supreme Court and are likely to be quashed now in view of the acceptance by the IT Department itself. They are now saying you give me material of your businesses from 2005 which have nothing to do with this issue. If the predicate offence itself does not subsist anymore because 2018-19 return has been fully accepted, why should this [ED] proceeding go on when I have given the full replies”.
- The Delhi High Court [W.P.(CRL) 2392/2021, CRL.M.A. 19314/2021, CRL.M.A. 14701/2022, CRL.M.A. 25294/2022, CRL.M.A. 14700/2022] vide its order dated January 23, 2023 inter alia held that "the petitioner is seeking quashing of ECIR and according to the Supreme Court in ‘Kirit Shrimankar vs U.O.I’ in W.P.(Crl) 109/2013 has held that a writ remedy on account of issuance of summons at the stage of investigation/enquiry is highly premature”. Further, the Delhi High Court vide the order dated January 23, 2023 held that “whether there is generation of proceeds of crime or not is being investigated and for the aforesaid reasons, the petition as of today is premature”.
