= Better Photography =

- Cover of August 2014 issue
- Chief Editor: K Madhavan Pillai
- Categories: Photography, lifestyle
- Frequency: Monthly
- Format: Print (paperback), web
- Circulation: 1 lakh+
- Publisher: Network18 Media & Investments Ltd.
- Founded: 1997
- Country: India
- Based in: Bombay (presently Mumbai)
- Language: English
- Website: Official website Publisher website

Better Photography is an Indian monthly photography magazine. It was established in Bombay in 1997.

The magazine features photographers like Henri Cartier-Bresson, Kishor Parekh, Ansel Adams, Homai Vyarawalla, David Alan Harvey, S. Paul and Steve McCurry. It has won annual awards such as Photographer of the Year, Wedding Photographer of the Year, Young Photographer of the Year, and Better Photography Excellence Awards.

== Collector's edition special issue ==
On completion of 13 years, a 600-page collector's edition special was released in June 2010, which included an interview with photographer David Alan Harvey, and four 100-page pocket guides: '′The Natural World′', '′People & Portraits, Beautiful Landscapes′' and '′Stunning Macros′, as part of its newly launched series Secrets of Shooting'′. It tied-up with National Geographic magazine for a joint special subscription offer from this issue. The issue had 60 per cent editorial content, compared to the regular 70 per cent.

== Background ==
The magazine is operated by Indian media and entertainment company Network 18.

== Sister publications ==
- Forbes India, the Indian edition of Forbes
- Overdrive, an Indian monthly automotive magazine
- Better Interiors, an interior design publication
