= In.com =

Indian web portal

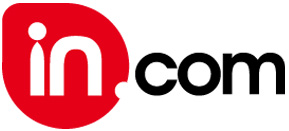
- Industry: Internet
- Headquarters: Mumbai, Maharashtra, India
- Owner: Web18
- Website: in.com

in.com was an Indian web portal owned by Web18, a subsidiary of Network18, and based in Mumbai. It operated from August 2008 until August 2019. As of December 2012 In.com was ranked 18th in the Alexa traffic rankings in India. In.com's email service shut down on 4 March 2015.

On 20 August 2019, the site went offline. Its content was not migrated elsewhere, and former URLs either return HTTP 404 errors or redirect to the News18 homepage as soft 404s.
