= Adil Zainulbhai =

Chairman of Network18 Group, Capacity Building Commission, and Quality Council of India

- Education: IIT Bombay; Harvard Business School
- Occupations: Chairman of Network18; Chairman of Quality Council of India (QCI); Chairman of Capacity Building Commission (CBC). Chairman, BoG, IIT Ropar

Adil Zainulbhai is the chairman of Network18 Group, the mass media subsidiary of the conglomerate Reliance Industries. He was also the chairman of Quality Council of India (QCI) from 2014 till 2022, and has been appointed as the chairman of the Capacity Building Commission (CBC), a commission set up by the government for its "Mission Karmayogi" project. Zainulbhai sits on the boards of Reliance Industries, Larsen & Toubro and Cipla as independent director, and is a member of the Washington, D.C–based US-India Strategic Partnership Forum.

== Early life and career ==
Zainulbhai graduated from IIT Bombay with a degree in mechanical engineering, and attended the Harvard Business School for a post-graduate degree in management. He has been granted a position in the advisory board for the Indian Institutes of Technology and is the president of Harvard Business School alumni association in India. Zainulbhai joined McKinsey & Company in 1979 in the United States where he headed the company's Washington office and initiated its Minneapolis office. In 2004, he returned to India after being appointed as the chairman of McKinsey India. In the company, he was closely associated with and was the protégé of Rajat Gupta, the first foreign born head of the company. Zainulbhai resigned from McKinsey in 2012.
