= The Quint =

English and Hindi language Indian news website

- Website type: News
- Available in: English & Hindi
- Owner: Quint Digital Limited (formerly known as Quint Digital Media Limited)
- CEO: Ritu Kapur
- Key people: Raghav Bahl; Ritu Kapur
- Employees: 155 (as of March 2023)
- Website: www.thequint.com www.quintdigitalmedia.com
- Launched: 2015

The Quint is an English and Hindi language Indian general news and opinion website founded by Raghav Bahl and Ritu Kapur after their exit from Network18. The publication's journalists have won three Ramnath Goenka Excellence in Journalism Awards and two Red Ink Awards.

== History ==
In May 2014, Raghav Bahl and Ritu Kapur, the promoters of Network18 ended their shareholding of the media conglomerate with the takeover by Reliance Industries. Following the controversial exit, they founded the digital media company, Quintillion Media. The company was the first major investor in the tech startup Quintype founded by Amit Rathore. Quintillion Media launched The Quint publication in January 2015 on Facebook and as a website by March 2015. Quintype took over the digital technology operations of the publication. By December 2016, The Quint website had crossed the mark of 10 million unique visitors.

In February 2017, The Quint launched two online content verticals Quint Neon, a lifestyle news section and QuintLabs, a multimedia exposition platform. In the same year, it also launched the fact checking initiative WebQoof and partnered with BBC News for the production of a video series to combat disinformation. In September 2018, Google India entered into a partnership with The Quint, to host the "Bol: Love Your Bhasha" event featuring panel discussions on media readership and business strategy with the objective of laying emphasis on the potential of Indian languages. The event was attended by Anant Goenka, the executive director of the Indian Express Group, Arvind Pani, the co-founder and CEO of Reverie Language Technologies and the Minister of Road Transport and Highways, Nitin Gadkari, among others.

The offices of The Quint and Raghav Bahl's residence were raided by the Income Tax Department of India in October 2018 in connection to an alleged case of tax evasion, the raid was termed as a survey by the Income Tax officers. Raghav Bahl released a statement which termed the raid as an attack on journalistic freedom while appealing to the autonomous Editors Guild of India to back The Quint such that a precedent is set against repetition of a similar exercise on any journalistic entity. The Editors Guild of India raised concerns that while the department was within its rights to carry out inquiries, the conduct of such exercises should not be akin to intimidation tactics.

In January 2019, The Quint introduced subscriptions for advertisement free delivery of its content and in July, it also introduced a premium membership initiative for access to webinars for members. Raghav Bahl completed his investment in the news publisher over the course of the years, amounting to $21.5 million from the capital gained following the sale of Network18.

In May 2020, The Quint was acquired by Gaurav Mercantiles through which it was listed on the Bombay Stock Exchange. The acquisition involved all assets of Quintillion Media excluding BloombergQuint. The transaction of Quintillion Media's assets to Gaurav Mercantiles was made on a related party basis due to the Bahl and Kapur's stake in both the companies and increased the borrowing base of Gaurav Mercantiles in accordance with the Companies Act 2013. Gaurav Mercantiles was earlier a ship breaking and trading firm which had not made any revenue since March 2018; ergo it entered into a debt-for-equity swap agreement in which Bahl and Kapur collectively acquired 66.42% of the company's stakes while Haldiram Snacks Pvt Ltd and the investment bank Elara Capital acquired 17-18% and 10% stake respectively. Mohan Lal Jain, the former chairman of Gaurav Mercantiles retained 4.99% stake in the company. In September 2020, Gaurav Mercantiles was renamed to Quint Digital Media Limited.

== Content ==
In terms of editorial content, The Quint is focused on educational and explanatory journalism. The primary mode of presentation is through newsletters, multimedia, documentary series, live video broadcasts, graphic journalism and podcasts. The site has published a range of influential stories on topics concerning sexual harassment, freedom of speech and Hindu nationalism. According to Reporters Without Borders, the site differs from other traditional news outlets in its interpretations of news with dedicated sections such as Documentaries and Explainers. The portal operates QuintLab which is described as an "innovation wing" of the publication and features an interface of various multimedia storytelling formats. The co-founder and CEO of The Quint, Ritu Kapur states that the publication's experimentation is concerted more towards the form and style of presentation that can be developed in a digital environment rather than the professional craft of journalism itself.

In order to combat disinformation, the publication also operates WebQoof, a fact-checking initiative certified by the International Fact-Checking Network. The fact-checking unit runs as a public service and encourages user submissions of claims for verification. Through audience participation, it gains access to hundreds of unverified claims and uses resource intensive techniques of employing journalists to fact-check claims and debunk hoaxes. The Quint is in particular involved in combating disinformation on the messenger app WhatsApp which has been noted to have become a difficult-to-penetrate viral distribution network afflicted by disinformation in India. According to Ritu Kapur, the co-founder of the publication, the WebQoof initiative has a reassuringly high consumption which goes against the presumptions of a post-truth world. The publication had also entered into a partnership with BBC News for the co-production of an educational video series "Swacch Digital India" to highlight the importance of fact-checking to its viewers.

The portal has also been noted for its advocacy journalism on gender related issues. In 2018, the "Talking Stalking" project on QuintLab was awarded gold in the "Best Innovation to Engage Youth Audiences" category by the World Association of Newspapers and News Publishers. The project was the first gender themed editorial initiative launched by the publication. Later, with funding from Facebook Inc, it launched "Me, The Change" editorial campaign focusing on stories of notable women alongside live events to encourage young women to become first time voters and elicit changes in legislation. As a result of the campaign, the Delhi Legislative Assembly passed a resolution in support of drafting a bill for making stalking, a non-bailable offence; the publication had previously held a feature event at Oxford Bookstore, New Delhi to raise support for the Stalking Bill. In 2019, the "Me, The Change" campaign received the Digipub World Award for "Best Brand Partnership".

The news publication operates through three digital platforms; the English language edition The Quint, the Hindi language edition The Quint Hindi and the healthcare news microsite called FIT. According to Raghav Bahl, co-founder of The Quint, the site's distinctive feature is its broad spectrum of coverage which "includes policy, politics, sports, business, food, entertainment and everything else" extending beyond the "narrow focus" of other news outlets. It has also been described by Reporters Without Borders as the first mobile based news service; the content of The Quint is primarily emphasized towards distribution through social media and mobile devices. Since December 2015, the publication has also been in a collaboration with Facebook, Inc. on its Instant Articles project and has presence on the social media platforms of Facebook, Twitter, Instagram and YouTube.

== Reception ==
A story published in the Columbia Journalism Review in late 2016 identified The Quint as one of several independent and recently founded internet-based media platforms – a group that also included Newslaundry, Scroll.in, The News Minute, The Wire and ScoopWhoop – that were attempting to challenge the dominance of India's traditional print and television news companies and their online offshoots. The Quint has also been certified by the Poynter Institute's International Fact-Checking Network for its reporting in WebQoof, its in-house fact-checking division. The publication has received recognition through a number of prestigious awards for its public interest journalism.

In a report of the Reuters Institute for the Study of Journalism, The Quint was compared with the Filipino news publication Rappler and the South African online newspaper Daily Maverick, and described as digital-born commercial news publishers engaged in producing critical independent journalism in destabilising democracies. According to the report, The Quint has faced extreme external pressure in the form of politically motivated attacks on media freedom, orchestrated digital disinformation campaigns and significant online harassment against its journalists; it was noted that online harassment was particularly severe against women journalists, often including threats of violence ranging from sexual assault to rape and murder.

In February 2017, The Quint published a sting video focused on how the Army's jawans were being deployed as sahayaks and performed a variety of menial tasks for officers; the profiled naik committed suicide a week afterwards in fear of an impending court-martial. The Army subsequently booked the Quint reporter for abetting his suicide, and violating the Official Secrets Act of India by trespassing into a prohibited area. Media critics have since dubbed the sting-operation as "overzealous journalism" with a host of ethical issues. In 2019, Bombay High Court quashed all charges against The Quint noting the Army to be vindictive.

Kulbhushan Jadhav is an Indian national who was arrested in Pakistan on charges of terrorism and spying for the Research and Analysis Wing (RAW) – India's external intelligence agency. After the arrest, on 5 January 2018, The Quint published a story by the journalist Chandan Nandy which claimed that Jadhav was being used to collect intelligence for India and that two former chiefs of the Research and Analysis Wing had allegedly stated that they were against the recruitment of Jadhav as a spy. The Hindu's Frontline magazine also published a story with a similar claim. The stories were picked up by Pakistani media agencies as apparent confirmation of Jadhav's affiliation. It drew criticism in India; the media watchdog Newslaundry raised questions on how The Quint could have been privy to such information. The publication retracted the story on 7 January stating that the factual accuracy of the article required rechecking. The story was later quoted by Pakistan in a related International Court of Justice case.

On 27 March 2020, during the COVID-19 pandemic in India, The Quint published an article which reported that India was in stage-3 transmission (community transmission). The government's Press Information Bureau denied the occurrence of community transmission and labeled the story as "misleading". The Times of India published a "fact-check" affirming the PIB statement and clarifying that the person being quoted did not have medical qualifications but had a PhD in Quality management. However, medical professionals also questioned the basis of the government's continued denial with some asserting that community transmission had already begun in March. The report published by The Quint had quoted Girdhar Gyani, the head of the NGO, Association of Healthcare Providers. Later the publication updated the article without any retractions to include information about Girdhar Gyani having been appointed as the convener of a COVID-19 hospital task force. As of 12 June, the Ministry of Health continued to deny any occurrence of community transfer in contradiction to opinions of independent medical experts.

=== Awards ===
- The Quint won three gold and one bronze at WAN–IFRA South Asian Digital Media Awards 2016. The publication's website won gold and bronze in the categories of "Best Reader Engagement" and "Best News Mobile Service" respectively.
- The Quint won one gold, two silver and one bronze at WAN–IFRA South Asian Digital Media Awards 2018. It won silver in the category of "Best Branded Content Project" for its feature on Madhya Pradesh Tourism.
- Two of The Quint's journalists won the Red Ink Awards in 2019.
- The Quint won one silver and two bronze at WAN–IFRA South Asian Digital Media Awards 2019. The publication's website won bronze in the "Best News Website or Mobile Service" for a second time.
- Four of The Quint's journalists won the Ramnath Goenka Excellence in Journalism Awards in three categories for 2019.

== Readership ==
The Quint website received a monthly unique readership of approximately 16 million as of March 2019. According to Google Analytics, nearly 69% of the readership was estimated to be between the ages of 18 and 34. In addition, the website had a subscriber base of over 175,000 readers on WhatsApp. The combined monthly exposure of unique users through all internet assets of The Quint was estimated to be 100 million. Per February 2019 data of CrowdTangle, the publication was the largest digital only news publisher on Facebook.

Per ComScore data, the monthly unique readership of website was 24.8 million as of August 2019.

== See also ==
- Rappler
- Daily Maverick
- BloombergQuint
