= IIT Ropar =

Research institute in Rupnagar, Punjab, India

Indian Institute of Technology Ropar
- Motto: Dhiyo yo naḥ pracodayāt (Sanskrit)
- Motto in English: Deploy our Intellect on the Right Path
- Type: Public
- Established: 2008 (18 years ago)
- Affiliations: Ministry of Education, Government of India
- Chairman: Adil Zainulbhai
- Director: Rajeev Ahuja
- Faculty: 179
- Students: 2,768
- Undergraduates: 1,408
- Postgraduates: 489
- Doctoral students: 871
- Location: Rupnagar, Punjab, India; 30°58′18″N 76°28′24″E
- Campus: Urban 525 acres (2.12 km^{2})
- Colours: Yellow; Green
- Nicknames: IIT Ropar, IITRPR
- Website: www.iitrpr.ac.in
- Educate . Elevate . Empower

The Indian Institute of Technology Ropar (abbreviated IIT Ropar or IITRpr) is a public technical university located in Rupnagar, Punjab, India. It is one of the eight Indian Institutes of Technology (IITs) established in 2008 by the Ministry of Human Resource Development (MHRD), Government of India under The Institutes of Technology (Amendment) Act, 2011 to expand the reach and enhance the quality of technical education in the country.

== History ==
IIT Ropar was established by the Ministry of Education, formally the Ministry of Human Resource Development (MHRD), Government of India, in the year 2008, under the Institutes of Technology (Amendment) Act, 2011. The Act was passed in the Lok Sabha on 24 March 2011 and by the Rajya Sabha on 30 April 2012. The classes for academic session 2008–2009 were held at Indian Institute of Technology Delhi. The Institute started functioning from its transit campus in Rupnagar from 1 August 2009. The foundation stone for the permanent campus was laid down on 24 February 2009 by the then Union HRD Minister Shri Arjun Singh. The institute has shifted its operations from permanent campus in June 2018, except for the departments of Humanities, Mathematics, Physics, Chemical Engineering and Civil Engineering, and some hostels and labs.

== Campus ==
=== Permanent Campus ===
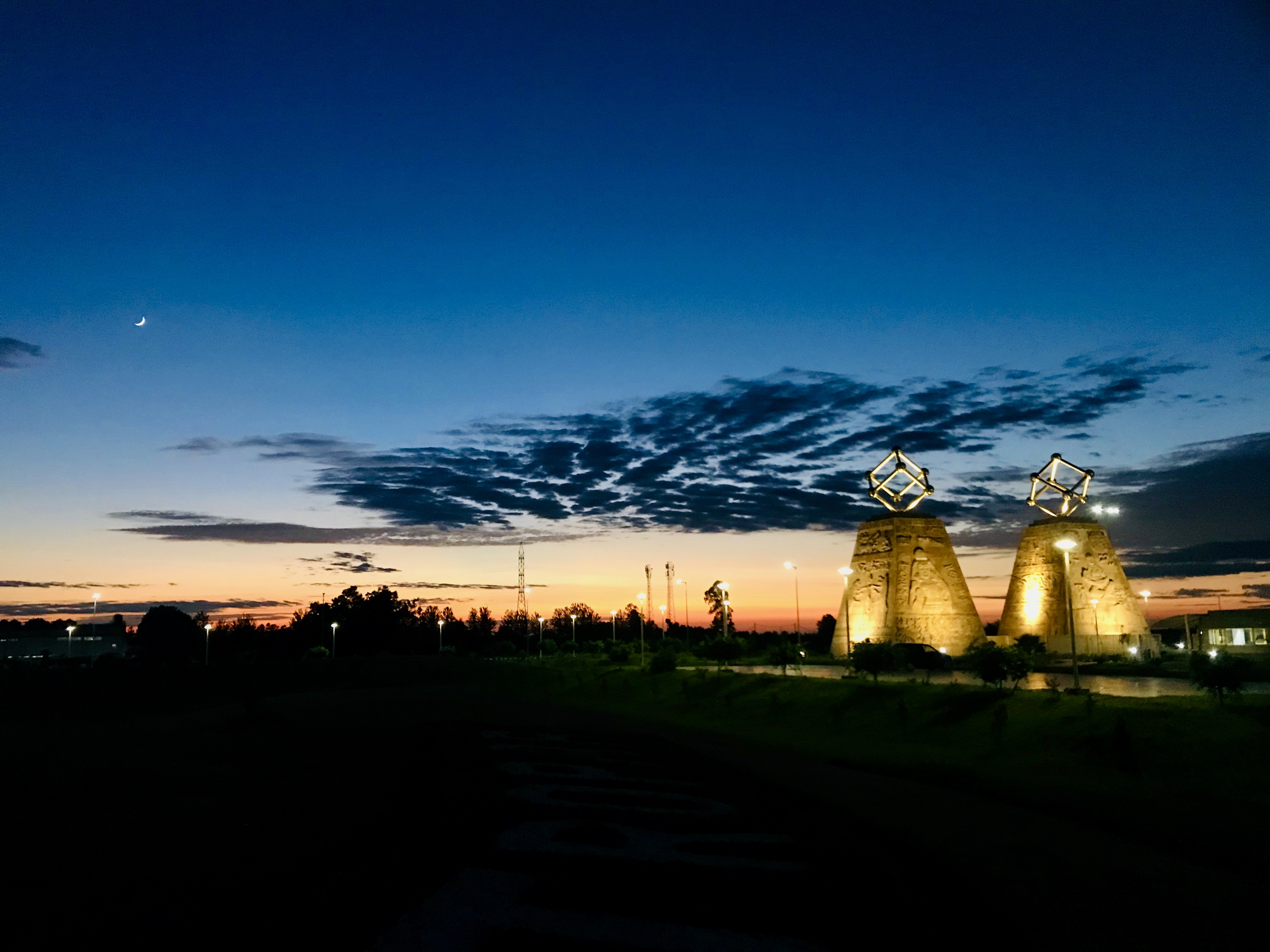
Main gate complex of the Indian Institute of Technology Ropar.

IIT Ropar operates from its 525 acres permanent campus since June 2018. The green campus of IIT Ropar is built on the bank of Satluj River, on the land earlier known as Birla Seed Farms, and the Sivalik Hills - "tresses of shiva" are seen from every corner of the ultra-modern campus. The architecture of the entrance gate is inspired by Indus Valley civilisation with four 41 feet high stone carved pyramid-like pillars at the entrance, constructed in collaboration with Archaeological Survey of India. IIT Ropar celebrates its Foundation Day on 24 February every year. The construction contract was awarded to CPWD, and a Bangkok-based construction company was assigned the task of finishing the first phase. The Computer Science and Engineering (CSE) Department has been the first department to completely shift to the permanent campus along with the library in July 2018. A part of the administration was shifted on 17 June 2018. By June 2019, all Administrative Offices, the Departments of Electrical, Computer Science and Mechanical Engineering shifted to the permanent campus.

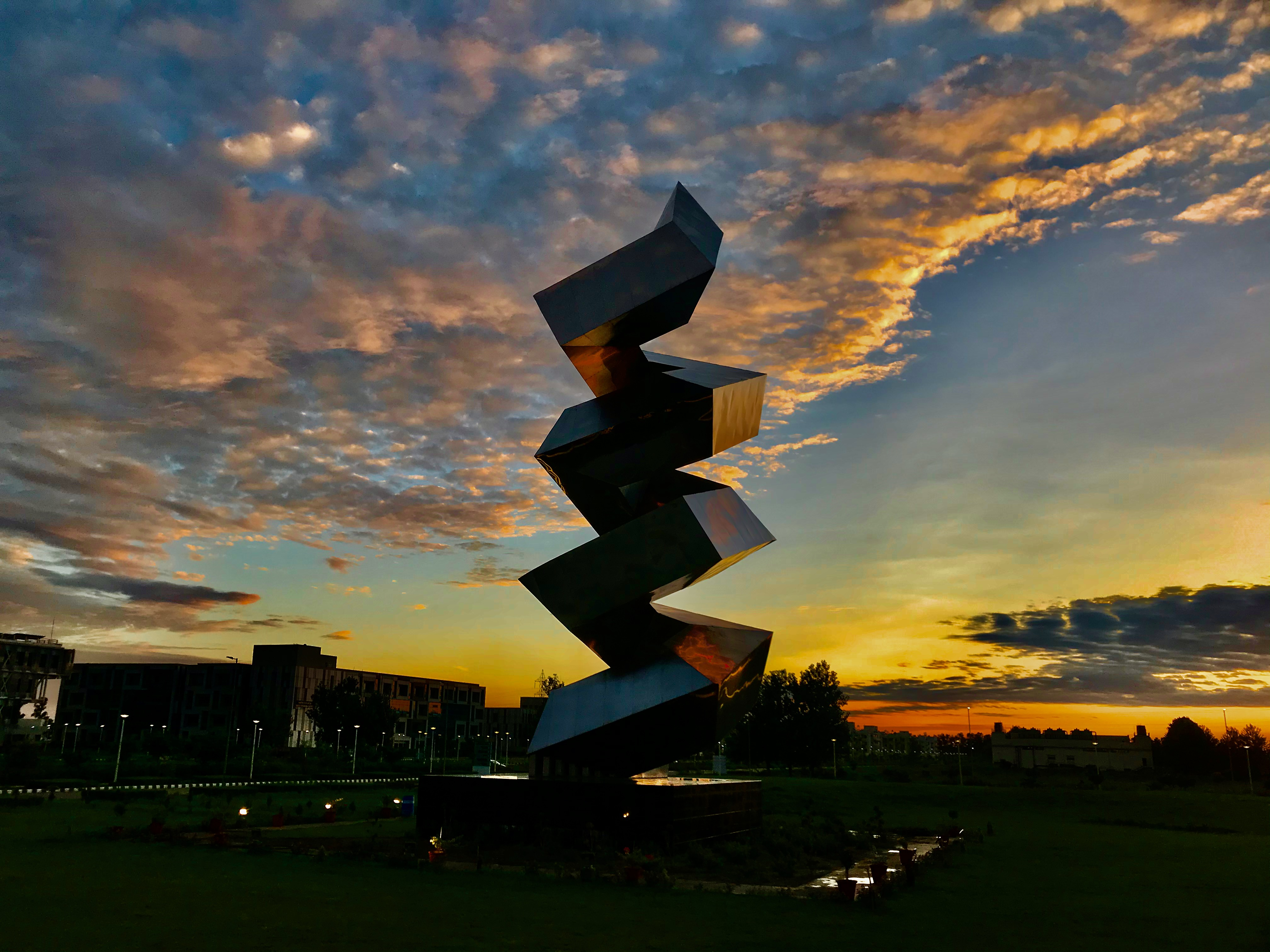
The Spiral – an artistic representation of the DNA structure. This structure is built at the entrance gate complex of the Indian Institute of Technology Ropar.

The institute has several key buildings and facilities on the campus. Some of the notable buildings are: Academic Block which houses various departments, classrooms, and faculty offices. The academic buildings are named after the eminent Indian scientists - S. Ramanujan Block, J. C. Bose Block, M. Visvesvaraya Block, Satish Dhawan Block, S. Bhatnagar Block, Radhakrishnan Block and the Har Gobind Khorana.

The institute, in the past, operated in two different transit campuses, transit campus - I & II, located in Rupnagar.

=== Transit Campus ===
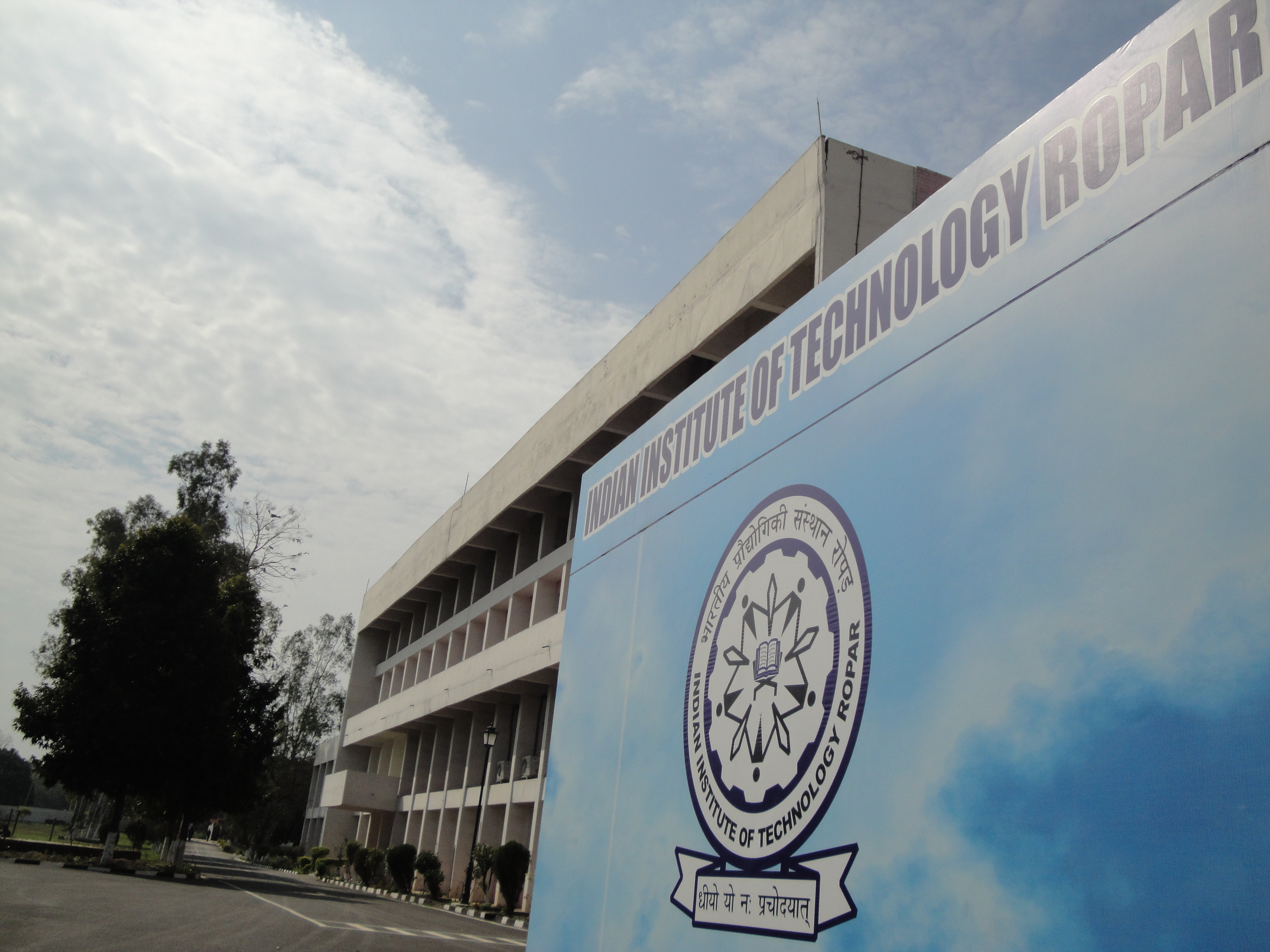
The main academic block of Transit Campus I

The transit campus - I of IIT Ropar was in the Women's Polytechnic college in Rupnagar district. The academic and administration buildings of the Women's Polytechnic college Ropar were offered by the Government of Punjab and renovated to match the initial requirements of the institute.

The transit campus - I houses four hostels: three for boys (Mercury, Jupiter and Neptune Houses) and one for girls (Venus House). The day-to-day management of hostels is taken care of by a committee consisting of student representatives, faculty members (as Wardens) and administrative staff (caretakers, office-heads). This campus also offered a state-of-the-art central library, an independent post office and a branch of State Bank of India.

On the transit campus - I, the sports facilities include a cricket field, three tennis courts, a football field, a gymnasium, a basketball court, two volleyball court and also a number of facilities for several athletics. The Students Activity Center (SAC) provided a gymnasium and rooms for different activity of the clubs.

Additionally, the institute has also operated from the buildings of the National Institute of Electronics and Information Technology (NIELIT) Ropar which shares the boundary with the new campus of the institute.

== Organisation and administration ==
=== Governance ===
All IITs follow the same organization structure which has President of India as visitor at the top of the hierarchy. Directly under the president is the IIT Council. Under the IIT Council is the board of governors of each IIT. Under the board of governors is the director, who is the chief academic and executive officer of the IIT. Under the director, in the organizational structure, comes the deputy director. Under the director and the deputy director, come the deans, the heads of departments, and the registrar.

=== Departments and Centres ===
The institute currently has 11 departments, 6 multi-disciplinary centre, 1 DST Technology Innovation Hub, and a School of Artificial Intelligence and Data Engineering. The departments are:

- Biomedical Engineering
- Chemical Engineering
- Chemistry
- Civil Engineering
- Computer Science and Engineering
- Electrical Engineering
- Humanities and Social Sciences
- Mathematics and Computing
- Metallurgical and Materials Engineering
- Mathematics
- Mechanical Engineering
- Physics
- School of Artificial Intelligence and Data Engineering **

=== DST Technology Innovation Hub ===
In 2020, the Department of Science of Technology (DST) has established a Technology Innovation Hub (TIH) in the application domain of Agriculture & Water, named Agriculture and Water Technology Development Hub (AWaDH), at IIT Ropar in the framework of National Mission on Interdisciplinary Cyber-Physical Systems (NM-ICPS). IIT Ropar TIH is primarily working on Water and Soil Quality Assessment Processes, Water Treatment and Management, Agriculture Automation and Information Systems, Stubble Management and Urban Farming, IoT Systems, and Instrumentation for mapping hazardous substances in water and soil, towards eco-friendly farming practices and to make farming more profitable for the grower. The technology innovation hub is led by Prof. Pushpendra P. Singh.

== Academics ==
=== Programmes ===
The institute offers undergraduate programmes awarding Bachelor of Technology in various engineering areas. Admission to these programmes is through JEE Advanced. The institute also offers postgraduate degrees awarding MTech and MSc (Research) in various engineering fields, as well as MSc in basic sciences. PhD courses in various fields are also offered.

=== Rankings ===
University rankings

General – international
- QS (Asia) (2022): 151-200
- Times (World) (2022): 101–200

Engineering – India
- NIRF (2024): 22

IIT Ropar has ranked 351–400 in the QS Asia Ranking 2022. The Times Higher Education World University Rankings ranked it 501–600 globally in the 2022 ranking. The National Institutional Ranking Framework (NIRF 2024) ranked it 22nd among engineering colleges and 45th in Research.

== Research ==
The institute stresses in inter-disciplinary research areas including Renewable and Clean Energy, Artificial intelligence (AI), Bio-imaging and Bio-instrumentation, Agriculture & Water, Rural Technology Development, Hydrogen Energy, Defense and Security etc. A Central Research Facility has been established encompassing equipment from various departments.

From the academic year 2017–18, the institute organises Research Conclave every year.

== Student life ==
=== Cultural festivals ===
Zeitgeist is the annual cultural festival of Indian Institute of Technology Ropar and is held annually as a three-day festival in October or November. It was conceived in September 2010. Advitiya, with its maiden edition in 2017, is the annual technical festival, which is held for three days in February or March. An annual sports festival, Aarohan is also held annually during February. It is currently in its second edition. These college fests are managed financially and conducted entirely by the students. An annual Indian classical music and dance event SPIC MACAY is also organized by the students and the faculty.

Events such as Inter Batch Cultural Championship (IBCC) and Inter Year Sports Championship (IYSC) are the intra-college events that are organized annually for the students of the institute.

The management of student activities is done by many boards functioning under the Student Affairs Department. These boards have elected student representatives known as General Secretaries, and an overall elected President of the Student Council. They have various societies and clubs to promote extra curricular and co-curricular activities.

== Alumni Association ==
The IIT Ropar Alumni Association was founded on 1 February 2013.

== See also ==
- List of universities in India
- Indian Institutes of Technology
- Education in India
- Engineering colleges in Punjab, India
