= Ritu Kapur =

Indian media entrepreneur

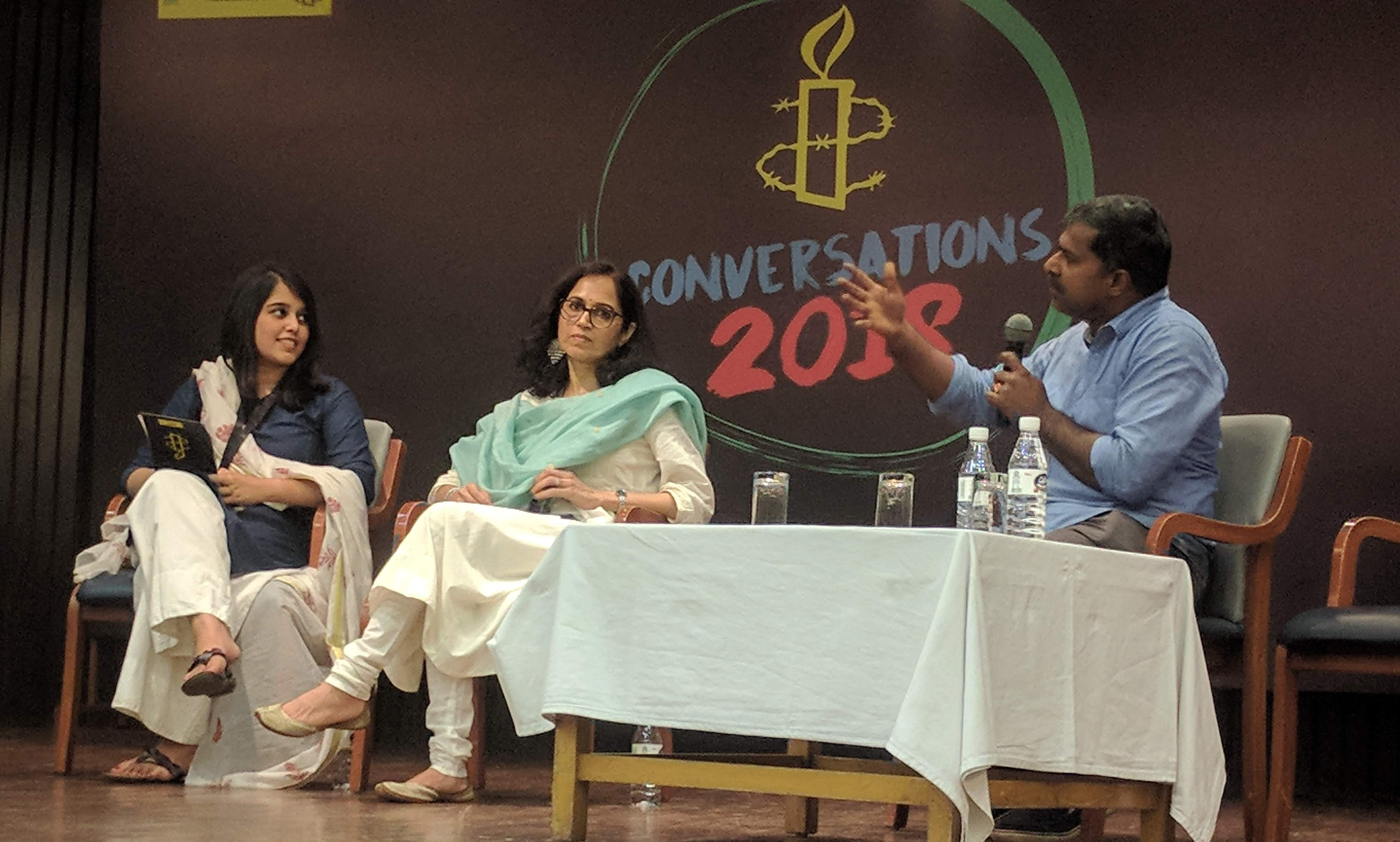
- Kapur (centre) at an Amnesty International event in New Delhi
- Education: St Stephen's College; Jamia Milia Islamia
- Known for: Founding member Network18; Co-founder The Quint
- Board member of: Reuters Institute for the Study of Journalism, Oxford University; Future News Worldwide, British Council; World Editor's Forum
- Spouse: Raghav Bahl

Ritu Kapur is an Indian media entrepreneur. She is the co-founder, managing director, and CEO of Quint Digital Limited, the parent company of The Quint, a web-based digital news site and was one of the founding members of Network18 in 1992.

Ritu Kapur is a board member at Reuters Institute Of Journalism, Oxford University. She is also an advisory board member at the British Council for their Future News Worldwide partnership program and a board member of the World Editor's Forum. In 2018, she was ranked the 49th most powerful woman on the Fortune's list of Most Powerful Women in India.

== Background ==
Ritu Kapur is an alumna of St Stephen's College. She secured her Masters in Film and TV production from A.J.K. Mass Communication Research Centre, Jamia Milia Islamia.

Her husband is Raghav Bahl, an Indian businessman and co-founder of Network18 and Quint Digital Limited. Ritu Kapur and Raghav Bahl have two children.

== Career ==
Ritu Kapur is credited with creating "The India Show", India's first home-grown show on a satellite channel, Star Plus. In 1995 she started directing and writing screenplays for television show, Bhanwar, recreating landmark cases in Indian legal history. Apart from being one of the founding members in Network18, she worked on various projects such as Real Heroes.

Ritu pioneered Citizen Journalism on Indian Television in 2008 when she launched "The CJ show" on CNN IBN, a show which has won various awards. In 2011, Ritu launched History TV18 (a joint venture with A+E Networks) as the Head of Programming. At History TV18, she conducted The Greatest Indian. Currently, Ritu Kapur is the co-founder, managing director, and CEO of The Quint.
