= BQ Prime =

Indian business news organization

- Industry: Business news
- Founded: 2016; 10 years ago
- Defunct: 8 December 2023; 2 years ago
- Successor: NDTV Profit
- Headquarters: New Delhi, India
- Key people: Anil Uniyal (CEO)
- Owner: Quintillion Media (74%); Bloomberg L.P. (26%)
- Website: www.bqprime.com

BQ Prime, formerly BloombergQuint, was an Indian business and financial news organization founded as a joint venture of Bloomberg News and Quintillion Media. It was acquired by Adani Media Ventures Pvt. Ltd. In 2022 and was merged with NDTV Profit of NDTV which is part of Adani Group in December 2023. Its main content was based on the Indian economy, international finance, corporate law and governance and business news. Within six months of going live, the web portal had one million monthly users, and there were plans to open a free-to-air TV channel. In July 2017, digital video analytics provider Vidooly rated BloombergQuint as the ninth most popular news brand among what it termed new-age news publishers. In September 2017, BloombergQuint launched a digital live streaming service available on its website (www.bloombergquint.com), the Bloomberg Terminal and BloombergQuint social platforms. The service includes daily live programming from both global and local markets. It launched a WhatsApp service in November 2017. It also announced a partnership with Nasscom, T-Hub and the government of Karnataka to launch 'ScaleUP', an initiative designed to help emerging companies and start-ups scale for growth in November 2017.

== History ==
Raghav Bahl, the founder and former managing director of Network 18, set up Quintillion Media along with his wife Ritu Kapur within six months of his controversial exit from Network18 in July 2014. Later, he signed a joint venture with Bloomberg L.P. to launch a digital product – BloombergQuint and a TV channel. According to the deal, Raghav Bahl would own 74% stake and Bloomberg the remaining 26%; the pact was for a 10-year period, as reported by Livemint. NASSCOM, T-Hub and Government of Karnataka partnered with BloombergQuint to launch ScaleUp an initiative to help emerging companies and start-ups scale for growth. Somdutta Singh, co-chair of NASSCOM Product Council, was the Chief Strategic Advisor for ScaleUp.

On 5 May 2022, the company changed its name from BloombergQuint to BQ Prime.

== TV channel ==
After an initial decision by Quint to scale back operations to focus on digital only, the partnership with Bloomberg continued. While in 2016 the BQ combine had nod of FIPB for an English news channel they were unable to acquire a broadcast licence from the Ministry of Information and Broadcasting (India). Following this in 2017, BQ acquired a licence of Y TV from Horizon Satellite Services Private Limited and applied for a name change of the licence to BloombergQuint in the Ministry. By 2020, the company decided to shut down the broadcast division and write off Rs 200 crores. By 2022, the partners Bloomberg and Quint parted ways as they still did not have a license. Having failed with Quint, Bloomberg was seeking Indian partners for its third planned stint in the Indian market.

== See also ==
- The Quint
