= Firstpost =

Indian news organisation

- Parent company: Network18 Group
- Status: Live
- Founded: 9 May 2011; 15 years ago
- Country of origin: India
- Headquarters location: Mumbai, India
- Official website: firstpost.com

Firstpost is an Indian news website forming part of the Network18 Group, owned by Reliance Industries and Mukesh Ambani. Firstpost has posted misinformation on multiple occasions.

The Network18 Group was originally founded by Raghav Bahl in 1993. In January 2012, it received an investment from Reliance through a rights issue, and lost control to it by 2014.

== History ==
Firstpost began in 2011 as an online news portal of Network18. In May 2013, the news group was merged with the Indian edition of Forbes India whose four top editorial heads, including editor in chief Indrajit Gupta, were dismissed. The event led to a media furor. Thereafter on 31 May 2013, Firstpost took over a satirical website Fakingnews.com for an undisclosed amount.

In 2015, The Caravan reported on censorship in Firstpost over criticism of political leaders such as Arun Jaitley. In January 2019, a weekly English-language print edition of Firstpost began, and then ended in June 2019, with publication of Firstpost continuing online. As of April 2020, Jaideep Giridhar is the executive editor of Firstpost in Mumbai, while Sanjay Singh is the deputy executive editor. On 26 January 2023, the prime-time show Vantage was launched, hosted by managing editor Palki Sharma Upadhyay, formerly of WION.

Fact-checkers have found Firstpost to have posted incorrect information on multiple occasions. In 2019, it published a misleading article claiming that Parineeti Chopra was removed as brand ambassador from Beti Bachao campaign after her comments on the CAA regulation. On 19 November 2020, it republished a report by Press Trust of India, which claimed that the Indian military had carried out "pinpoint strikes" that day in Pakistan administered Kashmir, a claim that was later refuted by the army, which clarified that the report was based on analysis of ceasefire violations on 13 November, and not the 19th. In 2020, it falsely reported that the Indian Government has launched a video conferencing called "Say Namaste" app. In 2022, it misreported a farmers protest in Balochistan, Pakistan, against the government's decision to buy onions and tomatoes from Afghanistan and Iran, as 'Sunni' farmers destroying tomatoes because they came from 'Shia' Iran as aid. In 2023, it falsely claimed Pakistan denied airspace to India's plane carrying relief aid for Turkey. In 2023, it used an unrelated photo from Hyderabad, India, in a report about several real-life necrophilia cases in Pakistan. In 2023, an Italian man who spreads hoax tweets using fake accounts made an account impersonating Nobel Laureate Claudia Goldin and claimed that Amartya Sen had died in a tweet that went viral and was reported by several news agencies in India, including Firstpost. In 2023, it falsely reported that Atiq Ahmed's vote had 'saved' the United Progressive Alliance government in 2008.

In 2024, it reported the claim of the Indian government's Ministry of Culture that Narendra Modi had inaugurated UAE's first Hindu temple, which turmed out to be false since UAE already had three Hindu temples in Dubai; Firstpost later clarified that the temple was the first Hindu temple in UAE's capital Abu Dhabi and not in UAE in general.

In 2024, Firstpost reported a claim from The Economic Times that Sheikh Hasina had alleged American involvement in regime change in Bangladesh, which was later disputed by Hasina's son, Sajeeb Wazed, who claimed that Hasina had never made such a statement. In 2024, it circulated false claim that deceased Bangladeshi Saiful Islam as lawyer of ISKCON leader Chinmoy Krishna Das’ lawyer. In 2025, it passed off an unrelated image from a 2021 video as being that of the perpetrator of the 2025 Pahalgam attack.
