= Network18 Group =

Indian media conglomerate

Network18 Media & Investments Limited
- Logo used since 2016
- Type: Public
- Traded as: BSE: 532798; NSE: Network18
- ISIN: INE870H01013
- Industry: Media
- Predecessor: TV18 (2005–2024)
- Founded: 16 February 1996; 30 years ago
- Key people: Adil Zainulbhai (Chairman); Rahul Joshi (MD, CEO and editor-in-chief)
- Revenue: ▲₹6,887.92 crore (US$740 million) (2025)
- Operating income: ▲₹208.26 crore (US$22 million) (2025)
- Net income: ▼₹−510.25 crore (US$−55 million) (2025)
- Total assets: ▲₹8,317.51 crore (US$890 million) (2025)
- Total equity: ▲₹4,671.84 crore (US$500 million) (2025)
- Owner: Reliance Industries (56.89%); Equity holdings (43.11%)
- Number of employees: 4,886 (2025)
- Website: www.nw18.com
- Footnotes; Financials as of 31 March 2025.

Network18 Media & Investments Limited (d/b/a Network18 Group) is an Indian media conglomerate owned by the Reliance Industries with 56.89% share headed by Mukesh Ambani and rest of 43.11% is equity holding. Rahul Joshi is the managing director, chief executive officer and group editor-in-chief, and Adil Zainulbhai is the chairman of its board of directors.

Incorporated in 1996 by Geeta and Rakesh Gupta, the company was acquired by Ritu Kapur and Raghav Bahl to be converted into a conglomerate holding company between 2003 and 2006. It oversaw one of the largest collections of media properties in India following its conversion but became encumbered with debt due to aggressive expansions. In 2012, the company entered into a debt agreement with Reliance Industries, through which it was granted a number of channels from the ETV Network. The agreement eventually enabled a hostile takeover of the company in 2014.

== History ==
=== 1996–2007: Acquisition and restructuring ===
SGA Finance and Management Services was incorporated on 16 February 1996, as a private limited company by Geeta and Rakesh Gupta and acquired soon afterwards by Vidya Devi and Anil Jindal. The company had remained inactive without any clear prospects until it was later acquired by the promoters of Television Eighteen India Limited.

The news broadcasting company Television Eighteen (TEIL) founded by Ritu Kapur and Raghav Bahl, became a public limited company in 1999 and its initial public offering (IPO) received an overwhelming response. The investments through the IPO exceeded the target set by the company by a magnitude of over 50 times by the end of the year, raising ₹2,511 crore (equivalent to ₹34 billion or US$360 million in 2026) in the process. This decreased the promoters' stake in the company from 75% to 26.11% by 2002 causing complications. The company was in the middle of preparations to launch a Hindi business news channel but could no longer meet regulatory guidelines. TEIL was in a joint venture with CNBC since 1998, and the news channel to be launched was called CNBC Awaaz. The guidelines required the Indian promoters to have more than 51% stake in their company to be able to establish a new uplink for broadcasting.

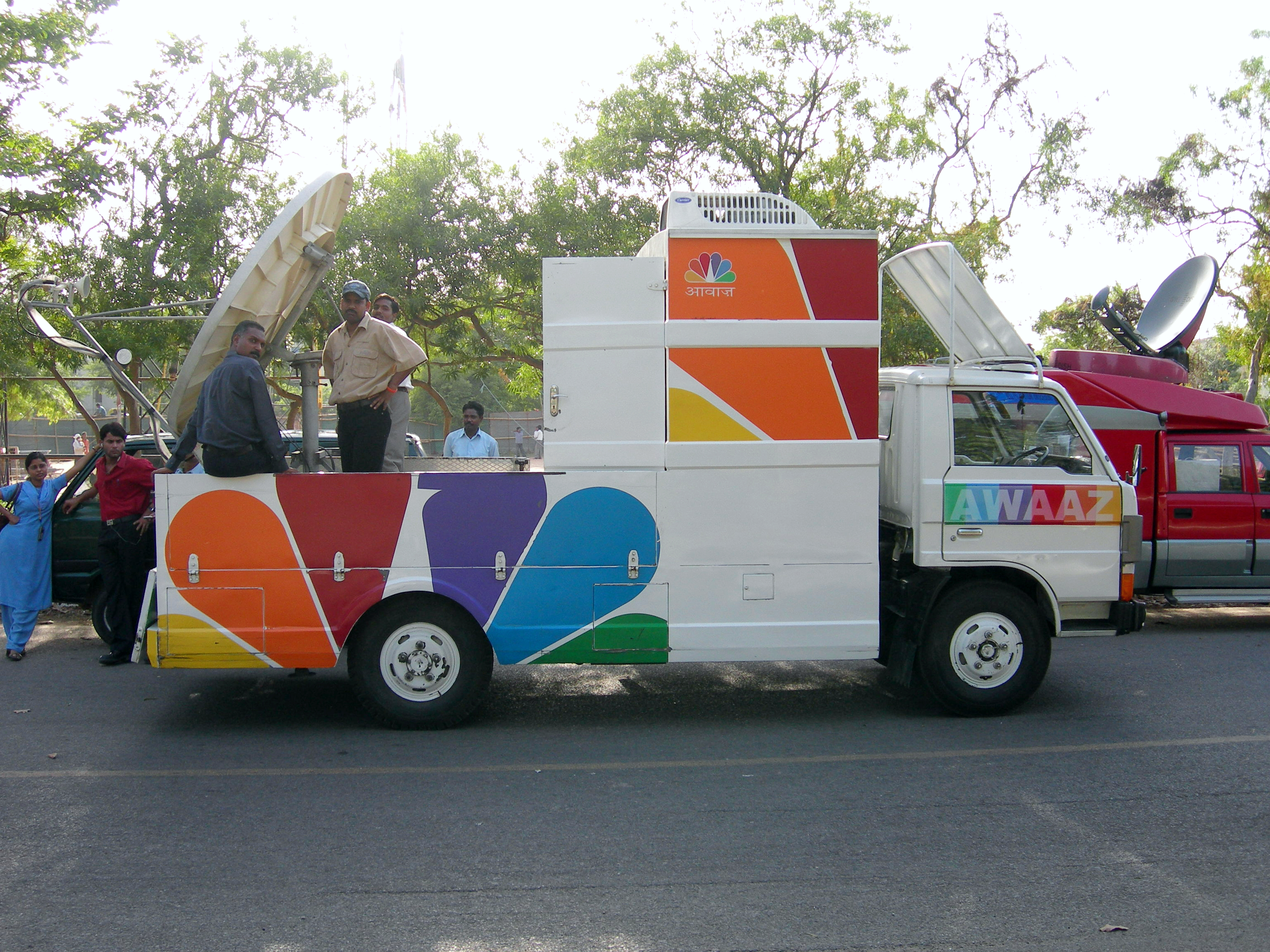
Production truck of CNBC Awaaz on the street (2006)

In 2003, SGA Finance was acquired by Ritu Kapur and Raghav Bahl, in to order to launch the channel and Bahl became its managing director. The company raised ₹5 crore (equivalent to ₹6.8 crore or US$720,000 in 2026) through two batches of investments from the two promoters in March 2003 and in January 2004, and then incorporated a subsidiary called SGA News. In the meantime, the government introduced a 26% foreign equity cap in the news broadcasting industry. In response to the new regulations the joint venture with CNBC was discarded and the partnership converted into a content branding and franchise agreement. In the financial year 2004–2005, TEIL invested ₹25 crore (equivalent to ₹34 crore or US$3.6 million in 2026) in SGA News for preferences stocks. CNBC Awaaz was launched on 13 January 2005.

In the financial year 2005–2006, TEIL supplemented its initial investment with an additional ₹39.10 crore (equivalent to ₹53 crore or US$5.7 million in 2026) in SGA News for common stocks. Following this, the boards of both the companies proposed a restructuring which received approval from the shareholders. The companies underwent several rounds of restructuring which came to a conclusion in November 2006. TEIL became a subsidiary of SGA Finance, the promoters gained a majority stake in TEIL, CNBC Awaaz was transferred to TEIL and shareholders of TEIL were accommodated with a stake in SGA Finance. On 20 October 2006, SGA Finance was converted into a public limited company and re-incorporated as Network18 Fincap Limited.

During the restructuring process, TEIL had also founded a subsidiary called Global Broadcast News (GBN). GBN had entered into a franchising partnership with CNN Worldwide to launch the English general news channel CNN IBN in December 2005. Bahl was able to convince several senior professionals working at the leading news broadcaster NDTV including their editor-in-chief Rajdeep Sardesai and the chief financial officer (CFO) Sameer Manchanda to join the enterprise before its launch. Haresh Chawla, the CEO of TEIL and Network18 was instrumental in both convincing Sardesai to quit and Bahl to take on NDTV as their competition. Due to the restructuring, Network18 instead of TEIL was allotted the shares of GBN and by the end of the financial year 2006–2007, Network18 held both GBN and TEIL as its subsidiaries; GBN operated CNN IBN and TEIL operating all the business news channels along with the information websites Moneycontrol and News Wire. Network18 was converted into a public limited company in 2006, and listed on the Bombay Stock Exchange (BSE) and the National Stock Exchange (NSE) in 2007.

=== 2007–2011: Expansion, consolidation and increasing debt ===
Global Broadcast News (GBN), the subsidiary operating CNN IBN became a publicly traded company in January 2007 and its IPO generated a successful response, similar to that of Television Eighteen India Limited (TEIL). GBN was renamed as IBN18 Broadcast, and on 1 December 2007, Network18 Fincap itself was renamed to Network18 Media & Investments. Network18 began diversifying with cross media interests in 2008. It had high liquidity and expanded rapidly, it started the film production house called Indian Film Company (IFC), launched the shopping channel Home Shop18, and entered into an franchise agreement to launch the Indian edition of the Forbes business magazine, while IBN18 Broadcast entered into a joint venture with the Marathi language newspaper Lokmat to launch the Marathi news channel IBN Lokmat, and began a joint venture with ViacomCBS to initiate the group's foray in mass media and general entertainment channels under Viacom18.

Network18 registered losses in the financial years 2008–2009 and 2009–2010. Its investments had outstripped the profits generated by its operational assets. In addition, the group had existing debt obligations and requirements for providing returns to its investors which resulted in net losses of ₹331.64 crore (equivalent to ₹450 crore or US$48 million in 2026) and ₹276.89 crore (equivalent to ₹375 crore or US$40 million in 2026) respectively. Viacom18 in particular was a drain on the company's funds. The financial statement of the company in 2009 had reported that it was retiring outstanding debt and raising funds through equity investments. In response to the financial challenges, the group began restructuring and consolidating its assets in the same year. IBN18 Broadcast was renamed to TV18 Broadcast and Television Eighteen India Limited (TEIL) which operated the business news channels of the company was merged into it. The digital media and publishing operations were transferred to the parent company Network18 under the divisions of Web18 Software Services and Network18 Publishing respectively.

In the financial year 2010–2011, Network18 registered a loss of ₹43.53 crore (equivalent to ₹59 crore or US$6.3 million in 2026), which was a considerable decrease from the previous two years and Bahl reportedly told the shareholders during the presentation of the annual report that "the best times are still ahead of us". In 2010, Network18 went on to announce a new joint venture AETN18 with the American media company A&E Networks to launch History TV18, the Indian edition of History channel. The company had also entered into a distribution joint venture with the Sun Network called Sun18. It had 2 divisions named Sun18 North and Sun18 South, the former was managed by Network18 and the latter by the Sun Network. The joint venture was later restricted to Tamil Nadu and replaced by the TV18–Viacom18 distribution joint venture IndiaCast in 2012. The consolidation of assets was completed by 2011 but it alone could not mitigate the financial challenges. Over the past years, the market had changed rapidly, the group was facing increased competition from other broadcasters, and advertising revenue had decreased due to economic downturn.

=== 2011–2014: Takeover by Reliance Industries ===
Network18 had made optimistic projections for years but after 2011, it came to face a possible financial collapse and loss of control for its managing director Raghav Bahl. The group had accumulated an outstanding debt of over ₹1,400 crore (equivalent to ₹19 billion or US$200 million in 2026) by September 2011. Employees were convinced that the company had expanded too aggressively and the market could not support it. In search of assistance in the form of external financing, Bahl decided to begin talks with the multinational energy giant Reliance Industries.

In November 2011, the CEO, Haresh Chawla resigned despite having been one of the founders of the media conglomerate. According to company insiders, he was persistently trying to convince Bahl to not enter into a debt agreement with Mukesh Ambani and instead raise funds by divesting part of the group's stake in the subsidiary Viacom18. In a later interview, he had commented that his resignation was an easy decision as he did not want anything to do with the Ambanis. According to a senior editor at the group, the decision to enter the talks was made reluctantly, as "[Bahl] was in a bind about entering a pact with the devil".

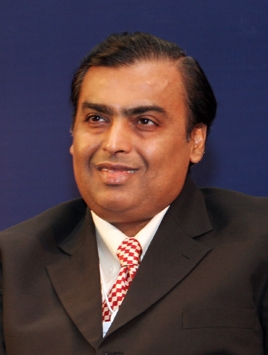
Mukesh Ambani, the chairman of Reliance Industries Limited (RIL)

On 3 January 2012, Reliance Industries Limited (RIL) and Network18 announced a partnership. Reliance Industries set up a body called the Independent Media Trust (IMT) and infused funds into the company through a number of shell companies as part of a complex financial transaction. ₹5,400 crore (equivalent to ₹73 billion or US$780 million in 2026) was transferred to Network18 and TV18 Broadcast, half the amount to each respectively, of which Network18 received a net amount of ₹4,000 crore (equivalent to ₹54 billion or US$580 million in 2026) due to its stake in TV18. The shell companies gained rights to debentures convertible to equity within 10 years. RIL also forced Network18 to buy its stakeholding in ETV Network for a sum of ₹2,100 crore (equivalent to ₹28 billion or US$300 million in 2026) without which the net sum would have been for a much smaller amount. The purchase also included two regional broadcasters; Panorama and Prism. The acquisition included most of the television broadcasting properties of the Ramoji Group. The group retained the rights to ETV brand, while Network18 acquired 100% shareholding of 5 general news channels, 50% shareholding of 5 general entertainment channels and 24.5% shareholding in 2 other channels. The entertainment channels were held by the joint venture of Viacom18. One point of disagreement for Chawla had been in the valuation of ETV at ₹3,500 crore (equivalent to ₹47 billion or US$510 million in 2026) when the company was worth only ₹525 crore (equivalent to ₹712 crore or US$76 million in 2026) in March 2011.

The transaction was completed in 2013, and turned Network18 into the largest group of media companies in India, surpassing Star India owned by the billionaire media mogul Rupert Murdoch and The Times Group owned by the Sahu Jain family. The broadband subsidiary of RIL, Infotel signed a memorandum of understanding with the group and gained preferential access to its content. In the form of a passive investor, RIL had indirect control over the company, and authority over its financial decisions. The executives retained operational control of the company. On 12 November 2012, IMT passed a resolution which allowed two senior officials from RIL to be appointed as additional trustees and Bahl lost further control within the trust. IMT held the option of converting the debentures to equity which could turn RIL into the majority shareholder of Network18.

In 2013, Network18 had become debt free, and RIL's investment had led to assumptions that it would not initiate any further cost-cutting measures. Viacom18 after being a drain on the network's finances for years had finished its long germination period and had entered into a period of exponential growth. However, on 16 August 2013, the company carried out an unexpected large scale wage reduction and staff lay-offs which came to be known as "Black Friday" among the employees. In the news branches, the lay-offs included around 300 producers, journalists and other staff, who were fired in no recognisable pattern in terms of salary, seniority or branch. There was ambiguity over severance packages and compensations and the human resources department was accompanied by executives of the RIL backed IMT in abrupt handing out of termination letters to employees without prior notice, who were then told to leave within 10 minutes. This further led to job insecurity among employees, many of whom began applying for and were hired by competing news broadcasters in the following period.

In the months of November–December, the network's coverage of Arvind Kejriwal started to become a source of contention with RIL and Ambani. Kejriwal was the head of the India Against Corruption (IAC) movement and had made several allegations against various politicians and businessmen, including Mukesh Ambani. His allegations against Ambani and RIL was over irregularities in pricing of natural gas in the Krishna Godavari Basin which received national media attention and was reported on by Network18 as well.

RIL denied the allegation and reacted by threatening to file a lawsuit against Kejriwal but without any effect. Following which, the energy giant reportedly attempted to pressurise Network18 into censoring any and all coverage of IAC and Kejriwal including in March 2014, in a direct communication between Ambani and Rajdeep Sardesai, the managing editor of CNN IBN and IBN 7. In the previous years, one allegation that had come up against Ambani was that he had bailed out Ramoji Rao in the Margdarsai chit fund scandal and in the process gained stake in Rao's ETV Network, the same company which RIL had forced Network18 to buy a stake in. According to an anonymous insider present at a meeting between the executives of Network18 and RIL, the right-hand man of Ambani, Manoj Modi had threatened Bahl by stating "You are calling us a dacoit, you are shouting that we are crony capitalists. If that is so, then why did you come to us for money in the first place? Do you think you have a clean record?"

Around the same time, the network increasingly began leaning right wing and attempted to publicise Narendra Modi as the prospective prime ministerial candidate with feature pieces and continuous reporting. The network dedicated more hours than any other broadcaster to Modi and disproportionately more compared to other candidates. The executives of Network18 were eager to repay the loan to RIL and get rid of Ambani's influence over the company. Reports have suggested that the network's coverage of Kejriwal became the trigger for the company to initiate a takeover. RIL communicated its intention to Bahl, offering him the option of continuing as managing editor with a ₹20 crore (equivalent to ₹27 crore or US$2.9 million in 2026) annual salary and gave him 3 days to make his decision. He rejected the offer and on 27 May 2014, announced in midst of a routine meeting with his board of directors that he was going to resign as RIL wanted to takeover and nothing could be done about it.

The announcement caused an exodus of employees from the company which included senior journalists and executives. B. Sai Kumar (CEO) and Ajay Chacko (COO) resigned on 28 May 2014. From the following day, a stream of resignations started coming in while RIL released a press statement that it had gained complete control of the company, R. D. S. Bawa (CFO) and Ritu Kapur (co-promoter and one of the directors) resigned on the same day. The legal general counsel to the company, Kshipra Jatana resigned from her position but stayed on to oversee the transfer of ownership. She was appointed as the manager of the company for the interim period since Bahl had resigned as well.

Bahl and Kapur received ₹706.96 crore (equivalent to ₹959 crore or US$100 million in 2026) for RIL to acquire their remaining shares. The net valuation of the company was at ₹4,295 crore (equivalent to ₹58 billion or US$620 million in 2026), whereas the net cash flow for RIL stood at ₹1,341 crore (equivalent to ₹18 billion or US$190 million in 2026) in the multi year transaction between 2011 and 2014 including those related to ETV. RIL had mitigated costs in this period through returns from the investments in the two companies and from selling the shares it had acquired in Network18's subsidiaries themselves. It was noted that due to the structure of the transaction, RIL had in effect partly financed its takeover by raising funds from the company's own subsidiaries such as TV18 Broadcast. The takeover process was completed on 7 July 2014; IMT and its sole benefactor RIL became the new promoters group.

=== 2014–present: Reliance Industries era ===
Following the takeover, Reliance Industries Limited (RIL) reshuffled the management and board of directors of both Network18 and its subsidiary TV18 Broadcast. The nominees of the RIL backed Independent Media Trust (IMT) joined the board of Network18. Deepak Parekh, the chairman of Housing Development Finance Corporation (HDFC) and Adil Zainulbhai were also inducted into the company as independent directors in the board. While retaining the position of independent director at RIL and Larsen & Toubro, and being the newly elected Narendra Modi government's appointment to the position of chairman of Quality Council of India (QCI), Zainulbhai was appointed by RIL to the position of chairman of the board. Commentators raised concerns that the editorial integrity of the network may not be preserved under the new management. The channels of the network had stopped all coverage of Kejriwal and the new Aam Aadmi Party who had levied corruption accusations at RIL. The editor-in-chief of the flagship general news channel CNN IBN, resigned within a week of the takeover with the reason that the management was interfering in editorial decision making and dictating what could or could not be aired.

A. P. Parigi, the former managing director and CEO of Entertainment Network India Limited (The Times Group subsidiary operating Radio Mirchi), was recruited by RIL and appointed as the new CEO of Network18 on 29 January 2015. Parigi resigned as CEO and was moved to an advisory role in the company on 1 October. Rahul Joshi replaced Parigi as the new CEO and was made the editor-in-chief of the group. Joshi was the editorial director of The Economic Times, a financial newspaper published by The Times Group before he had resigned from the company to join Network18 in August 2015. The editorial departments were unified with the operational and commercial divisions of the company, the chairman Zainulbhai stated that Pairigi had helped stabilise the operations and that Joshi would now run the company with an "ownership mindset".

The acquisition of the company by RIL, the largest conglomerate in India with deep interests in the energy sector, was considered to be a part of a trend of growing commodification of information, detrimental to the treatment of journalism as a public service. It increased the concentration of cross media ownership in the hands of a small group of large corporate actors in a market that was already oligopolistic and reduced the diversity of information disseminating outlets. Control over the news organisation, had strengthened RIL's ability to influence the formation of public opinion and as a result the political economy of the country, and also decreased space for reporting which could be detrimental to the energy giant's interests and public relations. Between 2014 and 2016, Network18 attempted to expand into regional markets of the news broadcasting sector with a spate of new channels, which was seen with apprehension among media observers. The expansion occurred as part of RIL's ₹150,000 crore (equivalent to ₹2.0 trillion or US$22 billion in 2026) investment in the rollout of its 4G data business.

RIL had stated during the takeover that the acquisition would help in differentiating their 4G business through corporate synergy. Infotel, the broadband subsidiary of RIL had been reincorporated as Reliance Jio Infocomm and was in the process of launching its data transfer business. It was suggested that the synergy would alleviate stresses posed by unstable market conditions in the news broadcast industry, while Jio would provide exclusive content from Network18 productions to increase traffic towards itself and expand its customer base. The synergy was however not adopted, according to analysts it was not financially beneficial to restrict content to only Jio customers and that Jio itself could be more profitable by being a content aggregator at competitive rates and still have a cost advantage due to its scale. In 2016, Network18 undertook a rebranding operation, the IBN brand was phased out and replaced with News18, channels such as CNN IBN renamed to CNN-News18, and IBN7 renamed to News18 India, among others. Earlier in December 2015, CNN Worldwide had finalised its decision to renew the franchise licensing agreement with Network18, after a period of uncertainty.

In May 2018, Cobrapost released a set of footages from a sting operation into several media organisations. Network18 was one of the organisations featured, and the sting displayed positive responses from senior marketing executives of the company to a proposition of entering into an agreement for undisclosed paid news to promote Hindutva political propaganda. The executives included sales and marketing head of the group as well as the sales head of the ETV Network with the latter remarking that they were already pushing the ideology and would increase their efforts by 80–90% following the agreement. The implications of the sting raised questions about media independence in India, and was described as a part of a phenomenon where the separation of editorial and marketing departments of news organisations are increasingly blurred due to advertisement business models. Several of the media houses denied the allegation put forth by the sting, Network18 did not respond to it.

On 9 July 2018, Joshi was elevated to the position of managing director while retaining the designations of CEO and group editor-in-chief. Kshipra Jatana who had officially held the designation of managing director since Bahl's resgination was removed from the position. In 2019, Network18 initiated heavy cost-cutting measures, increments and new hires were frozen while budgets for employing freelancers were greatly reduced. Newsrooms were demoralised as uncertainty grew among employees and outlets such as Firstpost which relied heavily on freelancers were severely affected in their operations. Economic slowdown had reduced advertisement revenues and the regional channels of the company had not been successful in their respective markets. The group had registered losses in the financial years of 2016–2017 and 2017–2018.

On 21 November 2019, RIL entered into talks with the Japanese multinational media conglomerate Sony Group for consideration over a number of potential deal structures including merger options, schemes for acquisition of a stake in Network18 or the acquisition of the entertainment assets of the company, among others. On 28 November, Bloomberg broke the news that Ambani was also in talks with The Times Group to potentially sell off the entire media conglomerate as it was suffering from losses. In response to the report, RIL released a statement describing it as "false and malicious". The Times Group denied it but with an addendum that "[they] will explore all strategic options as they present". In the following period, Network18's business news website Moneycontrol published an article which claimed that the newly founded joint venture, BloombergQuint was on the verge of collapse. The article was published 5 days after Bloomberg's report and was described as a retaliatory piece.

In February 2020, RIL announced that it would consolidate its distribution and media businesses. The subsidiary TV18 Broadcast would be merged with Network18, which would acquire the cable distribution companies DEN Networks and Hathway Cable & Datacom as two wholly owned subsidiaries, RIL held the two companies through an earlier acquisition in October 2018. The merger would have converted the Network18 into an integrated media and distribution company. The shareholding of the RIL in Network18 was projected to be reduced to 64% from 75% upon conclusion of the transactions in the merger operations. According to some analysts, the consolidation would streamline the corporate structure of the company and make it a more attractive option for strategic investors, while others stated that it decreased the likelihood of an agreement with Sony due to its key interest, the entertainment assets of Network18 becoming closely associated with the news operations, where there were restrictions over foreign ownership.

In April 2020, the MD and CEO of Viacom18, Shudhanshu Vats resigned and Joshi took over his position as an additional charge. The talks with Sony came to a finalised decision for a merger between Viacom18 and Sony Pictures Networks India in July. The merger was scheduled to be completed by the end of August, Sony would obtain 74% stake leaving Viacom18 with 26% stake in the merged entity; Network18 and ViacomCBS would have around 13% in it respectively. The plans for the merger was abandoned in October. The implementation of the consolidation with the distribution companies was itself delayed and eventually cancelled in April 2021.

In October 2020, TV18 Broadcast reported an 148.2% increase in profit margins during the COVID-19 pandemic in India and the company attributed it to "proactive measures on cost-control". In a Right to Information (RTI) request response in June 2021, data released by the Uttar Pradesh government showed that the government's spending on television advertisements was at ₹160.31 crore (equivalent to ₹196 crore or US$21 million in 2026) between April 2020 and May 2021 with Network18 as its biggest beneficiary. Promotion of the Atmanirbhar Bharat campaign constituted a major portion of the spending and was made in the initial part of the year. Umashankar Dube, a journalist who had filed the RTI request had raised questions seeking answers to why the spending was made on television advertisements and not on relief efforts in midst of the pandemic but the Uttar Pradesh government's additional chief secretary of information refused to respond to queries on advertisement spending.

On 30 December 2024, Viacom18 Media Private Limited ceased to be a subsidiary of Network18 Media & Investments Limited following a restructuring of Reliance Industries Limited's media businesses. Viacom18 was renamed to Studio18 Media Private Limited and brought the company under RIL's direct control. Network18 retains an indirect economic interest in JioStar through its shareholding in Studio18 but JioStar's operations are no longer conducted through Network18 as its subsidiary.

== Owned assets ==
=== Channels ===
Channel	Launched	Language	SD/HD availability	Notes
CNBC TV18	1999	English	SD+HD	
CNN News18	2005	English	SD	Previously known as CNN-IBN
News18 India	2005	Hindi	SD	Previously Known as Channel 7 and IBN7
CNBC Awaaz	2005	Hindi	SD	
News18 Rajasthan	2000	Hindi	SD	Previously known as ETV Rajasthan
News18 Uttar Pradesh Uttarakhand	2002	Hindi	SD	Previously known as ETV Uttar Pradesh/Uttarakhand
News18 Madhya Pradesh Chhattisgarh	2002	Hindi	SD	Previously known as ETV Madhya Pradesh/Chhattisgarh
News18 Bihar Jharkhand	2002	Hindi	SD	Previously known as ETV Bihar/Jharkhand
News18 Punjab Haryana Himachal	2014	Punjabi	SD	Previously known as ETV Haryana/Himachal Pradesh
News18 Odia	2015	Odia	SD	Previously known as ETV News Odia
News18 Urdu	2001	Urdu	SD	Previously known as ETV Urdu
News18 Kannada	2014	Kannada	SD	Previously known as ETV News Kannada
News18 Bangla	2014	Bengali	SD	Previously known as ETV News Bangla
News18 Gujarati	2014	Gujarati	SD	Previously known as ETV News Gujarati
CNBC Bajar	2014	Gujarati	SD	
News18 Assam North East	2016	Assamese	SD	
News18 Marathi	2008	Marathi	SD	Previously known as IBN Lokmat, News18 Lokmat
News18 Keralam	2015	Malayalam	SD	
News18 Tamil Nadu	2015	Tamil	SD	
News18 Jammu & Kashmir	2022	Kashmiri, Ladakhi	SD	
History TV18	2011	English; Hindi; Marathi; Tamil; Telugu	SD+HD	Joint Venture with A&E Networks

=== Magazines ===
- Better Interiors
- Better Photography
- Forbes India

=== Digital Media ===
- Firstpost
- Moneycontrol
- News18.com

== Corporate affairs ==
=== Ownership ===
- The group was acquired by Mukesh Ambani led conglomerate Reliance Industries in 2014. The acquisition occurred by maneuvering a complex deal through the Independent Media Trust (IMT), set up by Reliance Industries to issue a loan for the debt encumbered Network18 in 2012. It resulted in Reliance receiving 78% of the shareholding, and as of 2019, the conglomerate holds 73.16% of the shares.
- Teesta Retail is a private limited company which holds 1.85% shareholding of the group. It is an arm of Reliance Industries Investments and Holdings and is listed in the promoters group shareholders of Network18. The ownership of Teesta Retail is held by ten shell companies registered at the same address and with Reliance Industries domain names for their websites. The ten companies have listed directors of whom seven appear across all of them, who are also directors at various Reliance subsidiaries.
- Network18 is a public limited company and the public holdings constitutes around 25% of its shareholdings. Among major individual shareholders was the Chief financial officer (CFO) of Network18, Hariharan Mahadevan who held 1.11% of the shares as a part of the public in 2019.
- Currently, 56.89% is held by Reliance Industries and 43.11% in equity.

=== Management ===
Ritu Kapur was the first director of the company after the resignation of the Jindals and was followed by Raghav Bahl, who was the managing director of the company between 2003 and 2014. Haresh Chawla is considered to be the founding CEO of the company. He was appointed as the CEO of TV18 in 1999, having formerly worked at Times Music and Amitabh Bachchan Corporation. Chawla became the first CEO of Network18 after it was acquired and converted into the holding company of TV18. He resigned from the company in November 2011 before Network18 entered into a deal with Reliance Industries, publicly stating that he wanted nothing to with the Ambanis. According to Raghav Bahl, the entire credit for enabling Network18 to establish a diverse variety of partnerships with the likes of CNN Worldwide, CNBC, Forbes, Viacom and History Channel belonged to Chawla. The COO, B. Sai Kumar succeeded Chawla as the CEO of Network18, and resigned before the takeover of the company by Reliance.

One of the directors at Reliance Industries and the Prime Minister of India's appointment to the Quality Council of India, Adil Zainulbhai became the chairman of the board of directors of the company following the takeover. Kshipra Jatana was the general counsel at the group and had resigned during the takeover. She remained associated with the company to oversee the transition, and became the manager in the interim period. A. P. Parigi was appointed as the new CEO of the company after Sai Kumar's exit and held the position until he was moved to an advisory position by Reliance Industries in October 2015. Rahul Joshi, the editorial director at The Economic Times was recruited and appointed as both the CEO and editor-in-chief of the entire group following the takeover. In 2018, Joshi was elevated to the position of managing director by the board and Jatana resigned from her position.

Tenure	Chairman of the Board	Managing Director	Chief Executive Officer	Editor-in-Chief
2003–2011	(Non existent designation)	Raghav Bahl	Haresh Chawla	(Independent editorial management)
2011–2014	(Non existent designation)	Raghav Bahl	B. Sai Kumar	(Independent editorial management)
2014–2015	Adil Zainulbhai	Kshipra Jatana (non-directorial)	A. P. Parigi	(Independent editorial management)
2015–2018	Adil Zainulbhai	Kshipra Jatana (non-directorial)	Rahul Joshi	
2018–Present	Adil Zainulbhai	Rahul Joshi		
