= CNBC Awaaz =

Indian television channel

- Logo used since 2026
- Country: India
- Broadcast area: India and Asia
- Headquarters: Mumbai, India

Programming
- Language: Hindi
- Picture format: 4:3 (576i, SDTV); 16:9 (1080p, HDTV)

Ownership
- Owner: Network18 Group; Versant
- Sister channels: Network18 Group channels

History
- Launched: 13 January 2005; 21 years ago

Links
- Website: hindi.cnbctv18.com

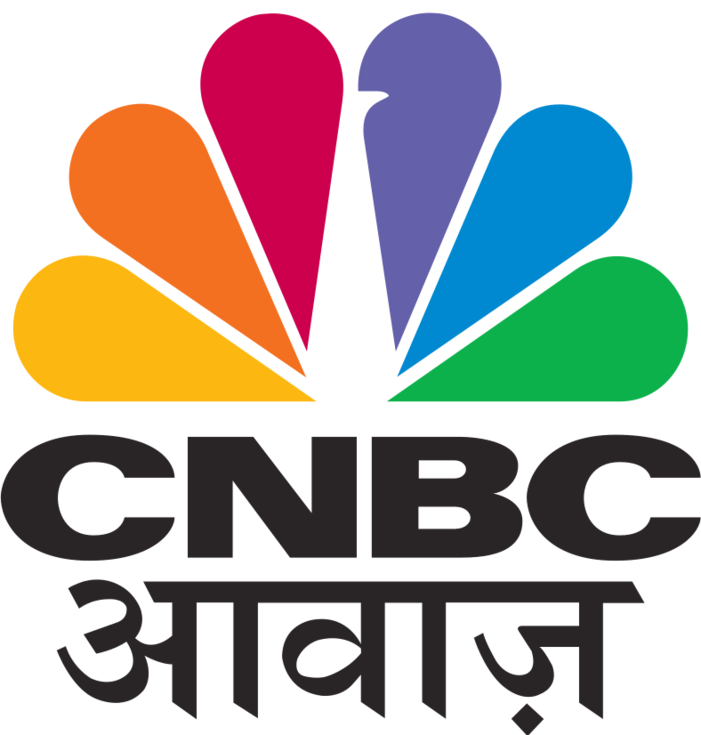
CNBC Awaaz logo used 2005–2026

CNBC Awaaz (lit. 'CNBC Voice') is an Indian pay television Hindi business news channel, owned by Network18 Group under a brand licensing agreement with Versant, based in New Delhi.

CNBC Awaaz launched 'CNBC Awaaz Travel Awards'.

== History ==
CNBC Awaaz was launched on 13 January 2005 in the presence of former PM Manmohan Singh and other political and business heavyweights.
