= Web18 =

Web18 Software Services Limited
- Trade name: Web18
- Industry: Internet
- Founded: 2006; 20 years ago
- Defunct: 2023; 3 years ago
- Headquarters: Mumbai, India
- Parent: Network18 Group
- Website: Official Website

Web18 Software Services Limited was the Internet and mobile arm of Network18, an Indian media conglomerate. It had a variety of information and transactional services based on the Internet.

== History ==
The TV18 group held 85% in Web18 Holdings while the remaining is held by Global Broadcast News Network, a part of the group.

Web18's offerings include Moneycontrol.com, CommoditiesControl.com, Firstpost.com, News18.com, Yatra.com, Homeshop18.com and BookMyShow.com

In 2016 Network18 Group appointed Manish Maheshwari who was previously working for Flipkart as CEO of Web18.

In December 2023, it was merged with its parent company Network18.
