= Better Interiors =

- Cover of October 2017 issue
- Editor: Deepa Nair
- Categories: Interior design, home, lifestyle
- Frequency: Monthly
- Format: Print (paperback), web
- Publisher: Network18 Media & Investments Ltd.
- Founded: May 2005; 21 years ago
- Country: India
- Language: English
- Website: Official website Publisher website

Better Interiors is an Indian monthly interior design magazine founded in May 2005.

== Background ==
The magazine was established by Infomedia India on 5 May 2005. Infomedia India was taken over by Indian media and entertainment company Network 18.

== Sister publications ==
- Forbes India, the Indian edition of Forbes
- Overdrive, an Indian monthly automotive magazine
- Better Photography, an Indian magazine for photo enthusiasts.
