= Forbes India =

Indian edition of Forbes

- Editor: Suveen Sinha
- Categories: Business magazine
- Frequency: Fortnightly
- Publisher: Network18 Media & Investments Ltd
- First issue: May 2009
- Company: Network18 Group
- Country: India
- Language: English
- Website: www.forbesindia.com
- ISSN: 2278-0440

Forbes India is the Indian edition of Forbes, managed by Network18, a media conglomerate owned by Reliance Industries.

== History and profile ==
Since its founding in 2008, Forbes India has achieved a circulation of 50,000 copies and makes over Rs 50 crore in topline. The magazine is published fortnightly.

In May 2013, the Network 18 owned Firstpost was merged with Forbes India. Shortly thereafter, the four top editorial heads who had led the growth of Forbes India, including its editor-in-chief Indrajit Gupta, were dismissed under surprisingly humiliating conditions. The event led to considerable media speculation. Press Club, Mumbai, passed a resolution: “The method of ejecting them from the company was nothing short of shameful. Journalists are not only messengers of news and information, but are the collective voice of civil society."

The new editor R. Jagannathan (erstwhile editor of First Post) took over Forbes India. He told The Caravan magazine that "Forbes ... is not meant to be an NGO. It is not meant to be anti-capitalism." The move might be a part of a shift within the journal towards right-wing politics, following a large infusion of cash from Mukesh Ambani-owned Reliance Industries Limited in the Network 18 conglomerate.

== Sister publications ==
- Overdrive, an Indian monthly automotive magazine
- Better Photography, an Indian magazine for photo enthusiasts
- Better Interiors, an interior design publication
