= Quality Council of India =

Public private partnership model

Quality Council Of India
- Formation: 1997; 29 years ago
- Type: Autonomous
- Purpose: To establish and promote quality standards across all social and economic sectors.
- Headquarters: New Delhi, Delhi
- Location: India
- Region served: Pan India, international
- Services: Accreditation Services; Healthcare; Industries; Institutions and Professionals; Quality Promotion; Quality Assessment
- Members: Individual and organisation
- Key people: No one (Chairman); Chakravarthy T. Kannan (Secretary General)
- Main organ: Governing Body
- Staff: 300+
- Website: www.qcin.org

The Quality Council of India (QCI) was set up as a public private partnership model on the model existing in Netherlands at the time, where although the National Accreditation Body (NAB) was not owned by the government, the government supported it and it was exceedingly used as a third party agency to improve quality in departments and industry. QCI thus came to be organized as an independent autonomous body that worked towards assuring quality standards across all spheres of economic and social activities. Key industry associations, i.e. Associated Chambers of Commerce and Industry of India (ASSOCHAM), Confederation of Indian Industry (CII) and Federation of Indian Chambers of Commerce and Industry (FICCI) became the promoters of the organizers and QCI got established under the Societies Registration Act in 1996 to provide accreditation services in various sectors for product, services and persons.

The council is independent and works under the directions of its Governing Body (GB) having equal representation of government, industry and industry associations. It does not get funded by the government and is a self-sustaining non-profit organization with its own Memorandum of Association (MOA) and Rules. Its current chairman is not appointed and the Executive Head (Secretary General) is Chakravarthy T. Kannan. Chairman of QCI is nominated by the Hon'ble Prime Minister of India and is a non-executive post.

== History ==
Post liberalization, India embarked on a process of creating the quality infrastructure in the country which can help Indian products and services easy access to foreign markets in the new order under WTO regime. In the process, an organization was sought to be established which would function as the National Accreditation body (NAB). The responsibility to set up the organization was given to the then Department of Industries (now Department for Promotion of Industry and Internal Trade (DPIIT)).

A committee of relevant ministries, governing bodies, and industry stakeholders was formulated in 1992 to propose suitable recommendations that can take form as an industry body. The Department of Industrial Policy and Promotion oversaw the process and the final recommendations were submitted to the Union Council of Ministers (Cabinet) in 1996.

Key recommendations included:

- need for establishing an organisation jointly run by the Government of India in conjuncture with relevant industries
- need for this organisation to be self-sustaining

Cabinet Committee accepted these and gave its approval to register a new autonomous body, Quality Council of India, under Societies Registration Act, 1860.

== Project Planning & Implementation Division (PPID) ==
With a view of propagating a culture of quality, Adil Zainulbhai, the former Chairman of QCI, has been instrumental in modifying the council and creating a young and talented workforce. Since its inception in 2015, the Project Planning & Implementation Division has focused on solving the key issues of the government with the help of a young team. It received its first project in September from the senior bureaucracy to work with 20 central ministries to improve the servicing by examining the public's grievances. The work includes project management, monitoring the performances of various cells, data analytics and tactical research. The key responsibilities include creating timelines and assessing the requirement of the plans, coordination with the stake-holders, methodology formulation and the overall execution and mobilization of the projects.

Major schemes and initiatives:

- Swachh Bharat Abhiyan – QCI held surveys regarding the progress of the initiative.
- Pradhan Mantri Kaushal Vikas Yojna

== Projects ==
=== Swachh Survekshan ===
Quality Council of India had been commissioned by the Ministry of Urban Development to conduct an extensive survey to measure the success rate of Swachh Bharat Mission. Under 'Swachh Survekshan 2016', QCI released hygiene rankings of 73 cities, including Tier 1 and Tier 2 as per Classification of Indian cities.

25 teams of 3 trained surveyors each visited 42 locations covering highly populated zones like railway stations, bus stands, marketplaces, religious places, residential zones and toilet complexes. 3,066 geo tagged photos were collected as evidence.

The second edition of Swachh Survekshan 2017 ranked 434 cities from January 4 to February 7, 2017.

Top 10 Cleanest Cities 2017

Rank	City	State
1	Indore	Madhya Pradesh
2	Bhopal	Madhya Pradesh
3	Visakhapatnam	Andhra Pradesh
4	Surat	Gujarat
5	Mysuru	Karnataka
6	Tiruchirapalli	Tamil Nadu
7	New Delhi Municipal Council	Delhi
8	Navi Mumbai	Maharashtra
9	Tirupati	Andhra Pradesh
10	Vadodara	Gujarat

Bottom 10 Cities 2017

Rank	City	State
1	Bulandshahr	Uttar Pradesh
2	Hapur	Uttar Pradesh
3	Khurja	Uttar Pradesh
4	Shahjahanpur	Uttar Pradesh
5	Abohar	Punjab
6	Muktsar	Punjab
7	Katihar	Bihar
8	Hardoi	Uttar Pradesh
9	Bagaha	Bihar
10	Bhusawal	Maharashtra

Top 10 Cleanest Cities 2016

Rank	City	State
1	Mysuru	Karnataka
2	Chandigarh	Punjab
3	Tiruchirapalli	Tamil Nadu
4	New Delhi Municipal Council	Delhi
5	Visakhapatnam	Andhra Pradesh
6	Surat	Gujarat
7	Rajkot	Gujarat
8	Gangtok	Sikkim
9	Pimpri-Chinchwad	Maharashtra
10	Greater Mumbai	Maharashtra

Bottom 10 Cities 2016

Rank	City	State
1	Kalyan-Dombivli	Maharashtra
2	Varanasi	Uttar Pradesh
3	Jamshedpur	Jharkhand
4	Ghaziabad	Uttar Pradesh
5	Raipur	Chhattisgarh
6	Meerut	Uttar Pradesh
7	Patna	Bihar
8	Itanagar	Arunachal Pradesh
9	Asansol	West Bengal
10	Dhanbad	Jharkhand

=== Yoga scheme ===
In 2016, Quality Council of India introduced a voluntary certification for to assure standardised yoga practices across the world.

Along with the yoga scheme, QCI also runs a certification for Yoga Training Schools. With objective of raising the standard of training professionals graduating from these institutions. Over 18,500 aspirants registered under the scheme, 6,000 examined and over 900 yoga professionals have been certified.

A Memorandum of Understanding has been signed with Peru, Bolivia and Japan for promotion of certified yoga practices. Currently, it is in talks with Malaysia, Poland, Russia and Australia for such tie-ups.

=== MSME registration under ZED ===
Prime Minister of India, Narendra Modi, initiated the Zero Defect Zero Effect (ZED) model in 2016 as an integral component of Make in India. The model was conceptualised to help Ministry of Micro, Small and Medium Enterprises improve quality and environmental standards to prevent return of goods after manufacturing.

A flagship project of QCI, aims to certify over 1.25 Million MSMEs within five years to match international quality standards.

=== e-Quest ===
On 23 May 2017, QCI launched an e-learning certification in line with the government's Digital India campaign to accredit manufacturers. The courses include Total Quality Management, Total Productive Maintenance and Manufacturing competitiveness. It enables entrepreneurs to gain certification in functional areas of manufacturing and quality practices.

Active projects:

- ZED
- Scheme For Voluntary Certification Of Yoga Professionals
- Indian Certification for Medical Devices (ICMED) Scheme
- INDIA Good Agriculture Practices (INDGAP) Certification Scheme
- Voluntary Certification Scheme for Lead Safe Paints (VCSLSP)
- Traditional Health Practitioners Certification Scheme (THP)
- Capacity Building Program for Voluntary Consumer Organizations
- Ready Mix Concrete Plant Certification Scheme (RMCPCS)
- Attestation of Courseware for IT ITeS SSC
- QCI Scheme for Approval of Emergency Response Disaster Management Plans (ERDMP) under PNGRB Regulations
- Voluntary Certification Scheme for AYUSH Products
- Voluntary Certification Scheme for Medicinal Plant Produce (VCSMPP)
- FSSAI Initiative – Tasty Food Safe Food

=== DigiReady Certification ===
The DigiReady Certification portal was launched, as announced by the QCI and Open Network for Digital Commerce (ONDC) on 8 February 2024. Through the use of this online self-assessment tool, small and medium-sized enterprises can determine how well-equipped they are to join the ONDC platform as vendors. The certification procedure assesses a number of digital readiness factors, such as the availability of the paperwork required for online operations, the user's familiarity with software and technology, the ability to integrate with current digital processes, and the effectiveness of order and catalog management. Participants will receive an e-certificate designating their company as DigiReady to onboard one of the network seller partners upon satisfactorily answering all critical questions. Anyone who answers a question wrong will be sent to a hand-holding tool to help them become more proficient in the appropriate module so they can answer questions correctly. Seller Applications will contact entities to make the on-boarding process easier for them when they are DigiReady and give their permission.

== Associated ministries ==
- Ministry of Urban Development
- Ministry of Drinking Water and Sanitation
- Ministry of Skill Development and Entrepreneurship
- State Government of Gujarat
- National Skills Development Corporation
- Ministry of Human Resources Development
- National Council for Teacher Education
- Ministry of Petroleum and Natural Gas
- Ministry of Railways
- NITI Aayog (erstwhile planning commission of India)
- Ministry of New and Renewable Energy
- Department of Administrative Reform and Public Grievances (DARPG)

== Board composition ==
- Chairperson (appointed by prime minister of India)
- Immediate Past Chairperson
- Secretary General-Quality Council of India
- Indian Medical Association
- Consumer Co-ordination Council
- Insurance Regulatory & Development Authority (IRDA)
- Indian Nursing Council
- Secretary, Ministry of AYUSH
- Director General, Armed Forces Medical Services
- Directorate General of Health Services (DGHS), MOHFW
- Dean, Maulana Azad Medical College, New Delhi
- Secretary, Ministry of Tourism
- Drugs Controller General of India
- Chair, Health Committee – CII
- Chair, Health Committee – ASSOCHAM
- Chair, Health Committee – FICCI
- Academy of Hospital Administration (AHA)
- President, State Medical Council (currently Delhi State)
- Consortium of Accredited Healthcare Organizations (CAHO)
- Chair, Accreditation Committee – NABH
- Chair, Hospital Technical Committee – NABH
- Chair, Appeals Committee – NABH
- CEO NABH – Member Secretary

== Boards ==
A 38-member council governs QCI, which is responsible for formulating strategy, general policies and monitoring various components including the accreditation boards. The council ensures transparency and credibility amongst the entire system.

QCI functions through 5 main accreditation boards.

=== National Accreditation Board for Certification Bodies (NABCB) ===
The board confers accreditations to various certification bodies. It follows the ISO: 17011 guidelines for accreditation. As per the appropriate international criterion, NABCB is a part of the international structure of certification and inspection bodies. The board identifies requirements for the competence of the bodies executing inspection. Additionally, it ensures neutral and steady activities of inspection.

=== National Accreditation Board for Education and Training (NABET) ===
The National Accreditation Borard for Education and Training (NABET) is a constituent board of the Quality Council of India (QCI). It accredits schools and vocational training institutes against defined quality standards. According to the board accreditation is intended to align education standards with the demand for skilled professionals in India and abroad, to support improvements in teaching, learning and evaluation in line with national curricular objectives.

=== National Board for Quality Promotion (NBQP) ===
The board primarily endorses cognizance on standards such as QMS, EMS, FSMS, ISMS etc. as well as tools of quality. Consequently, it empowers businesses to compete for better quality standards. The board currently consists of 26 members and one of the main motives is to achieve the main objective of QCI to facilitate National Quality Campaign. The National Board for Quality Promotion is re-formed every four years and will include Federation of Indian Small and Micro & Medium Enterprises (FISME). The tools help the industries to follow to the code of conduct, quality standards and deal with the challenges.

=== National Accreditation Board for Hospitals & Healthcare Providers (NABH) ===
Established in 2006, NABH establishes and operates accreditation programs for healthcare organizations. It has gradually introduced new standards for the smaller hospitals that find it difficult to cope with the full standards of NABH.

=== National Accreditation Board for Testing and Calibration Laboratories (NABL) ===
NABL is registered under Societies Registration Act, 1860. The purpose of the board is to provide the Industry and Government with third-party schemes for the assessment of the technical competence and quality of pertaining bodies. Apart from being their signatory for accreditation of Testing, connections with International Accreditation Co-operation (ILAC) and Asia Pacific Laboratory Accreditation Co-operation (APLAC) are maintained by NABL.

== D.L. Shah Award ==
Started in 2007, The QCI D.L Shah award recognizes achievements in refining products & services and improved customer service. Open to all types of organizations, they're allowed to submit a maximum of 3 projects. The prerequisites include that the organization should be registered in India and free of convictions from the judiciary. The award is divided into the following categories depending on specific requirements:

- Platinum Award
- Gold Award
- Silver Award

2017 marks the 11th edition of the D.L. Shah award for successful projects in production operation and service and customer/stakeholder satisfaction.
