= Iron Age wooden cult figures =

Overview of anthropomorphic stake gods

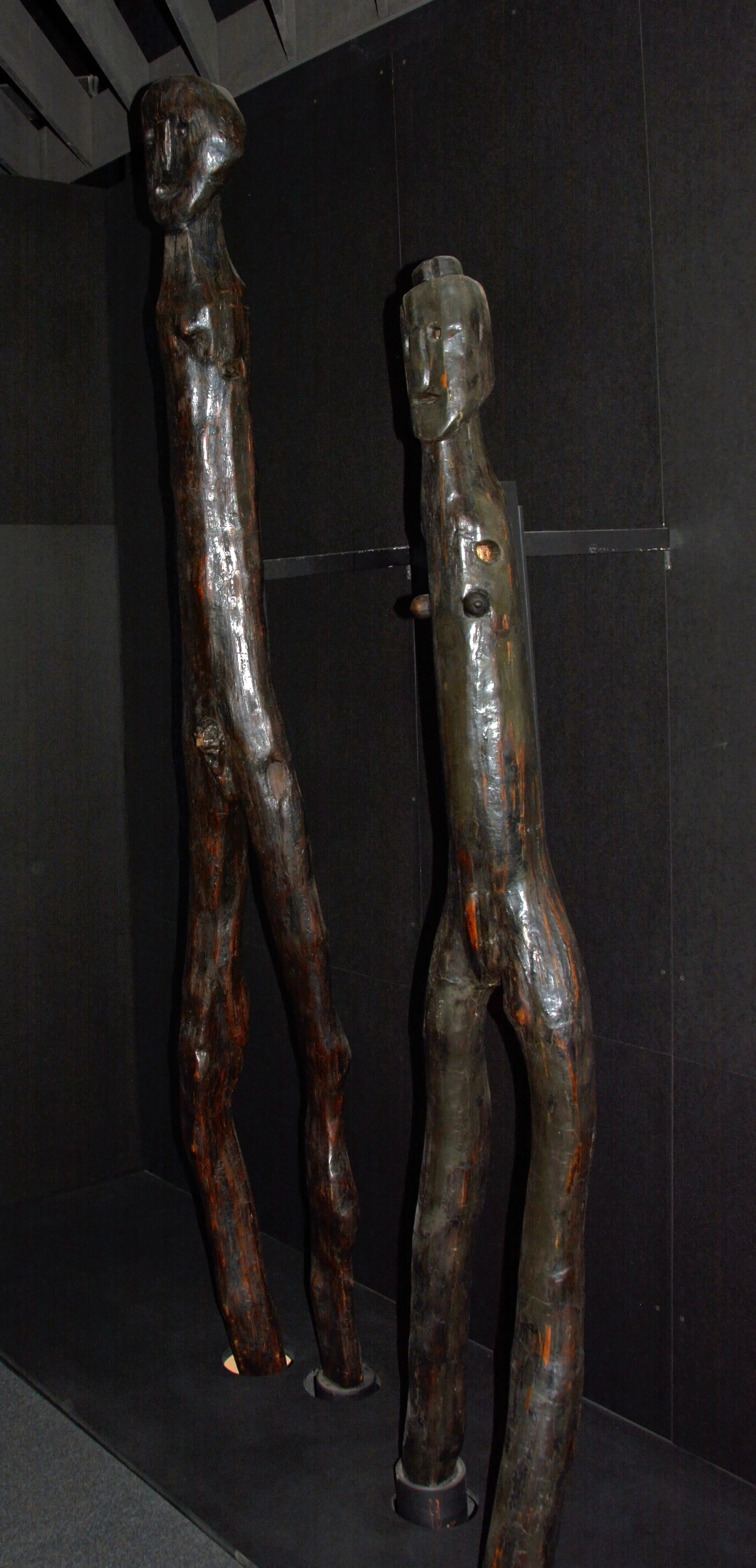
Braak Bog Figures (Type 2) found in Northern Germany and dated to approximately 2nd to early 4th centuries BCE.

Anthropomorphic Iron Age wooden cult figures, sometimes called pole gods, have been found at many archaeological sites in Central and Northern Europe. They are generally interpreted as cult images, in some cases presumably depicting deities, sometimes with either a votive or an apotropaic (protective) function. Many have been preserved in peat bogs. The majority are crudely worked poles or forked sticks; some take the form of carved planks.

They have been dated to periods from the Mesolithic to the Early Middle Ages, including the Roman Era and the Migration Age. The majority have been found in areas of Germanic settlement, but some are from areas of Celtic settlement and from the later part of the date range, Slavic settlement. A typology has been developed based on the large number found at Oberdorla, Thuringia, at a sacrificial bog which is now the Opfermoor Vogtei open-air museum.

The oldest of the figures is the Mesolithic find from Willemstad, North Brabant in the Netherlands and the latest is 13th-century, but most date from between c. 500 BCE and 500 CE. They are found as far west as Ireland (although at least one found in Britain, the Strata Florida figure from Wales, was imported) and as far east as Gorbunovo Moor in Russia. By far the majority were preserved in wetlands of some sort; however, only one figure—from the late Bronze Age settlement at Wasserburg Buchau, near Bad Buchau in Baden-Württemberg, Germany—has been found in the lake village culture of the Alps.

== Geographical distribution ==
Locations of anthropomorphic pole gods/ancestral sculptures made of wood (discovered in modern times or location described by credible sources (see Cape Arkona Temple))

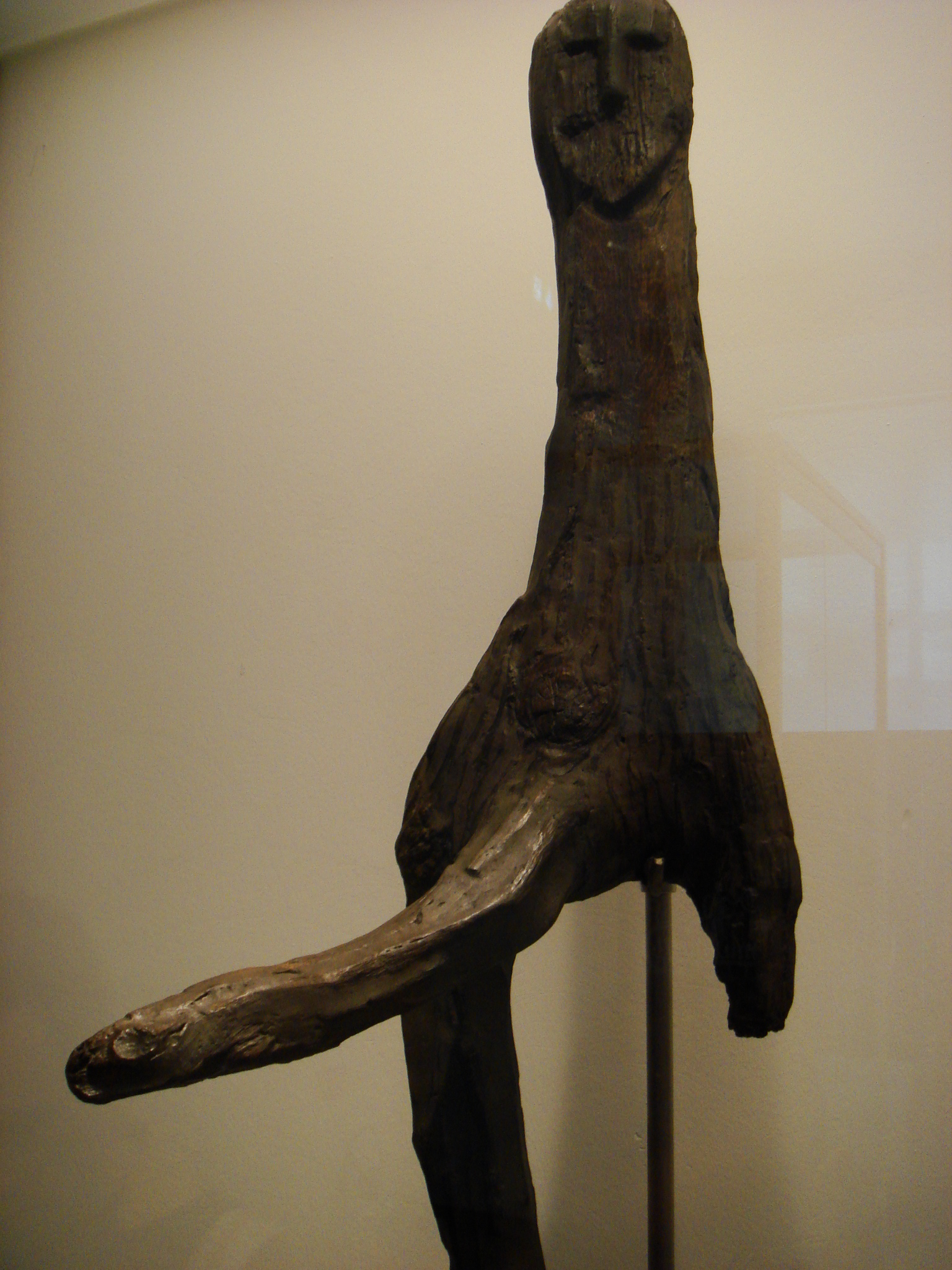
Broddenbjerg idol, a figure made from a forked stick (Type 2) and dated to approximately 535–520 BCE

Locations of anthropomorphic idols are spread across the entire northwestern to eastern European region and represent a pan-European phenomenon across cultural boundaries. The documented sites shown on the map can be considered as a small subset of the true number of pole idols. It is plausible that numerous finds are still waiting in the soil of the extensive, former swamp landscapes of Europe (Baltic Sea neighbors, Germany, Netherlands, Russia, etc.), if they have not been destroyed during peat mining (see destruction of boardwalks in Wittemoor) etc. .

== Germanic-speaking areas ==
=== Context and development ===
The earliest evidence of anthropomorphic wooden cult figures in areas that would later have Germanic-speaking inhabitants is from the Bronze Age. The Broddenbjerg idol, an ithyphallic forked-stick figure found in a peat bog near Viborg, Denmark, is carbon-dated to approximately 535–520 BCE. The Braak Bog Figures, a male and female forked-stick pair found in a peat bog at Braak, Schleswig-Holstein, have been dated to the 2nd to 3rd centuries BCE but also as early as the 4th century. In areas with Germanic-speakers, figures have been found in an area extending from Schleswig-Holstein in Germany to Norrland in Sweden, but the vast majority have been preserved in bogs or other moist environments, so it is impossible to know how widespread the practice actually was. One figure has been found on dry land, in a ditch complex on a hillside at Bad Doberan, Mecklenburg-Vorpommern. The great majority of the figurines are markedly more abstract than other artistic artefacts of their time. The 5th-6th century seated figure from the Rude-Eskilstrup bog in Munke Bjergby parish, Zealand, Denmark, is unusually detailed: it has a triple neck-ring or collar, a kirtle and a pronounced chin or beard, and resembles a bronze figure found at Bregneburg on Funen. It has been suggested that this figure may have stood in a heathen temple and been placed in the bog at the conversion. Furthermore, post holes have been identified such as that which forms the focal point of the "grandstand" at the 6th to 7th-century Anglo-Saxon royal hall site of Yeavering. With a side length of 56 centimetres (22 in) and a depth of approximately 1.2 metres (3 ft 11 in), it indicates a pillar of considerable size, presumably a cult pillar of some sort.

The Old Norse term for a god áss (the singular of Æsir; derived from the Common Germanic root *ans, *ansuz and also recorded for Gothic as the Latin plural Anses by Jordanes) has a homonym meaning "pole" or "beam". Jacob Grimm proposed that as the origin of the "god word" and the etymology was accepted by some scholars; it would suggest that the word is derived from god-images in pole form, but relating it to the Indian asuras as a term of Indo-European origins is equally plausible. Some of the wooden figures take the form of a simple pole or post, sometimes set up in a heap of stones.

=== Literary attestations ===
Tacitus states in Germania that while the Germanic peoples had idols, they did not consider it fitting to anthropomorphize them. One example he describes is the annual parading of an image of the goddess Nerthus. Later Germanic peoples do not seem to have had this aversion, as evidenced by the more complex figures made of carved forked sticks that recall the "wooden people" or "tree-men" of the Eddic poem "Hávamál":

Váðir mínar gaf ek velli at tveim trémǫnnom; rekkar þat þóttusk, er þeir rift hǫfðo, neiss er nökkviðr halr.	My clothes I gave in the countryside to two twig-men. Great fellows they thought themselves when they had garments— a man is mortified naked.

Other more or less contemporary texts also attest to wooden cult figurines in Scandinavian paganism. Christian missionary writings refer disparagingly to wooden "idols", such as the figure of the god Freyr in Gunnars þáttr helmings. The Saga of Ragnar Lothbrok describes a god on Samsø in the form of a 40 feet wooden pole shaped to look like a man that tells that it was set up by the sons of Ragnar Lothbrok in order to perform sacrifices for victory. In Ibn Fadlan's early 10th-century account of the Volga Vikings, he writes that as soon as they come into harbour, they leave their ships with food and alcoholic drink and offer them at a tall piece of wood with the face of a man carved in it, which is surrounded by smaller similar figures. Such an arrangement has been found at sites such as the Oberdorla sacrificial bog.

The mentions in Icelandic sagas of Öndvegissúlur carved with the images of gods, in particular Thor and Freyr, and of other idols, may be related but have been influenced by Christian concepts since the sagas were written down in the 12th to 14th centuries, centuries after the heathen period.

=== Forms and material ===
Günter Behm-Blancke classified the anthropomorphic figurines into four groups based on the finds at Oberdorla:

- Type 1. Poles or posts, sometimes equipped with a phallus, as at Oberdorla; a variant form from Possendorf, Weimar, (now lost) has a carved head and attached raised arms.
- Type 2. Formed from a forked stick, with a head carved out at the top. Those found at Oberdorla are all female; in North Germany and Scandinavia, ithyphallic male figures are also found, such as the Broddenbjerg idol from near Viborg, Denmark and the more artistically developed male and female Braak Bog Figures from Schleswig-Holstein. Sizes range from approximately 1 to 3 metres (3 ft 3 in to 9 ft 10 in).
- Type 3. Carved from a broad plank cut in silhouette with blank faces, males with rectangular bodies, females with breasts or shoulders indicated by a slanted cut, broad hips and vulva. Found at Oberdorla and at the Wittemoor timber trackway (corduroy road) in Berne, Lower Saxony, these are thought to have had an apotropaic (protective) purpose.
- Type 4. Carved from a squared piece of timber with an inclined head and a base, similar to a herm. One of this type was found at Oberdorla, in a late La Tène context.

Most of the figures which have been preserved are of oak, which was probably preferred for its endurance in the mostly wet locations where they were deposited.

=== Interpretations ===
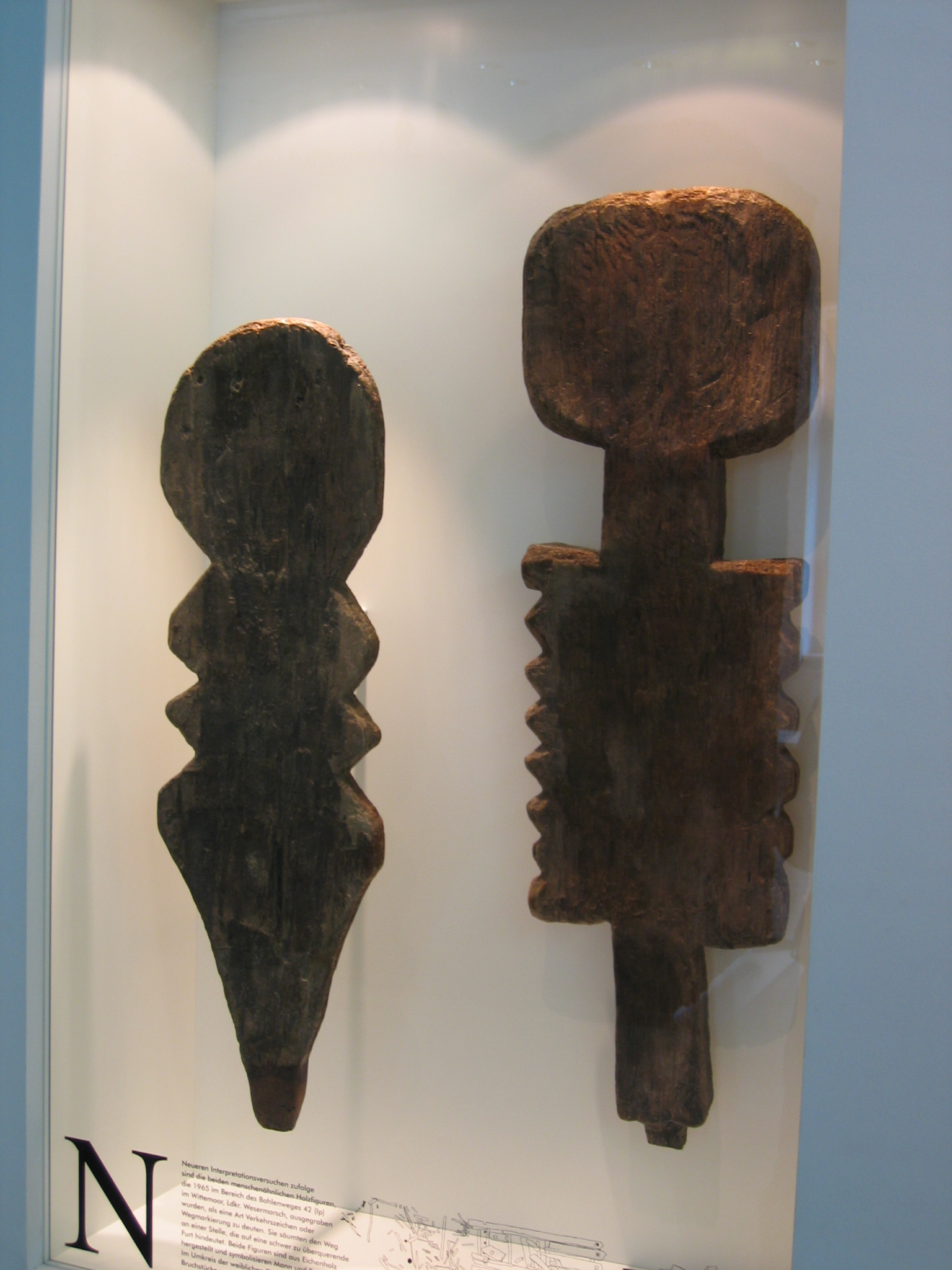
Female (left) and male (right) plank figures (Type 3) from the Wittemoor timber trackway

It is impossible to determine the exact purpose of the figurines, or their relationship to the named Germanic gods and goddesses, with whose worship they overlap; examples are found dating to as late as the Viking Age. We cannot determine how typical those which have happened to survive and be found, or their locations, are; and our surviving written sources of information on Germanic paganism are likewise incomplete. They have been interpreted, in particular by Behm-Blancke, as the site of fertility sacrifices, based on the indications of male and female sexual characteristics and the frequent association with potsherds and the bones of animals and, at Oberdorla, of humans. They may originate in a phallus cult, although there are few indications of such a cult in Germanic paganism. Alternatively, since the veneration of pillars extends beyond the Germanic cultural area, they may originate in the belief in the world pillar (as seen in the Saxon Irminsul and the Old Norse Yggdrasill) and thus derive from an archaic tree cult.

Heiko Steuer has suggested that in the case of the male and female Wittemoor figures, which stood on either side of a plank causeway through a marsh, there may have been a secular decorative motive in addition to the spiritual luck-bringing and warding (apotropaic) functions.

== Celtic-speaking areas ==
Relatively few figurines have been found in areas of Celtic-speaking settlement, and because of overlap with Germanic-speaking settlement, particularly in the North Sea region, it is sometimes difficult to assign a figure to one or the other group of people.

A fragment of an anthropomorphic figurine made of oak dating to the 2nd century BCE was found in a possibly sacrificial shaft inside a Viereckschanze enclosure in the Schmiden section of Fellbach in Baden-Württemberg, Germany. It originally depicted a person, apparently seated, between two rams, with hands around their rumps; only the hands survive from the human figure.

Lucan's Pharsalia refers to a sacred grove near Massilia (Marseille) which was a location of human sacrifice and had stone altars and rough-hewn wooden idols.

In a stone replica of a xoanon found at Euffigneix in Haute-Marne, France, called the god of Euffigneix, the sculptor has reproduced the knot-holes as eye-like openings on the sides. Two maple-wood columns with torcs found in the cultic enclosure of Libenice near Kolín, in Central Bohemia, date to the Roman period. A 3-metre (9.8 ft) oak sculpture of a "guardian deity" wearing a cowl was found in the old harbour basin of Geneva, Switzerland. And primitively carved wooden stelae have been found at sites of worship of goddesses of water-sources, such as the so-called Pforzheim Sirona. An oak statue belonging to the La Tène culture was found at the mouth of the River Rhone in Lake Geneva, near Villeneuve, Vaud, Switzerland. It is 1.25 metres (4 ft 1 in) tall and clothed in a tunic. It was dated by means of three Celtic silver coins of the 2nd century BCE which were in a fissure in the statue, and is thought to depict a late 2nd to mid-1st century Celtic deity, apparently associated with the river or the lake. Finally, a wooden figure 58 centimetres (23 in) was found in Montbouy, west of Orléans in central France. It is presumed to be male and the location of the find, in the well of a Roman temple, suggests it served a devotional purpose; the style of the figure resembles that of pre-Roman figures from North Germany.

=== Ireland ===
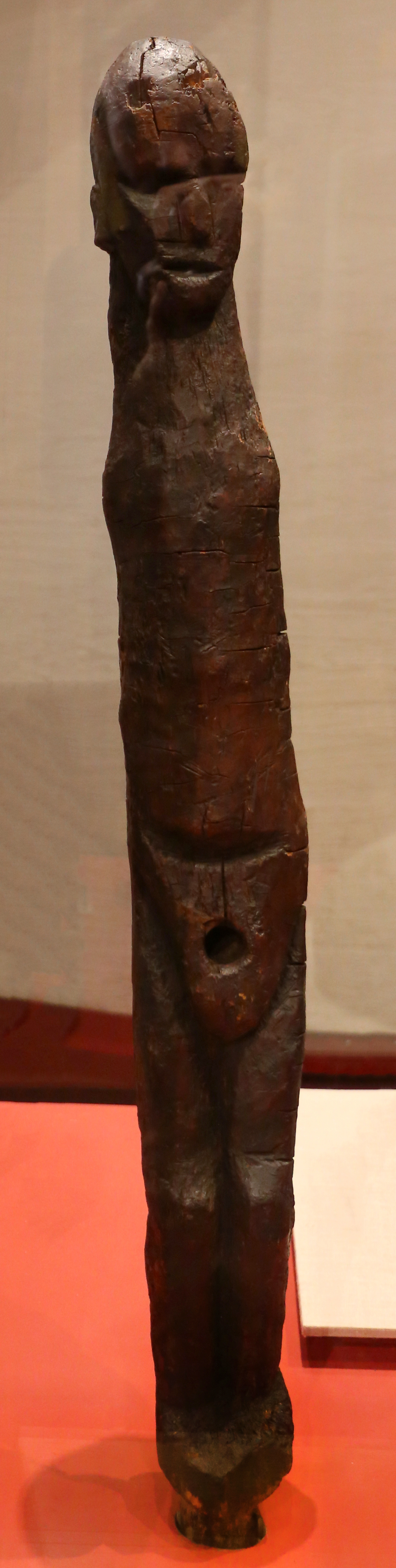
The Ralaghan Idol, c. 1000 BC

To date twenty three anthropomorphic figures are known from Ireland, dating from the Early Bronze Age to the Late Iron Age. The figures come from eleven wetland sites across Ireland. They include two figures known only from paper records: one from the Golden Bog of Cullen, County Tipperary, found in the late-late eighteenth century, and a second from Ballybritain, County Londonderry, found in the 1790s. In 1930, Adolf Mahr published the discovery of a prehistoric anthropomorphic figure found during turf cutting in a bog at Ralaghan, County Cavan, Ireland, called Ralaghan Man. It has a genital opening containing a piece of white quartz, which may represent a vulva or may have been an attachment point for a penis.

In 1934, the first archaeologically excavated figure was identified during excavations at Lagore crannog, County Meath by Hugh O'Neill Hencken. The figure is one of two explicitly anthropomorphic figures in the corpus, the remainder being more stylized. It is 0.47 m tall and consists of a heart-shaped face, a square torso without arms, and two simple legs ending in feet. A slight bump in the pubic area is interpreted as indicating male genitals. The Lagore figure is the earliest to have been found in Ireland and dates to 2135–1944 cal. BC.

The latest is the Gortnacrannagh Figure dating to cal. AD 252–413 (1715±28 BP; UBA-43937), from a fen flanking the Owenur River in County Roscommon.

=== Scotland ===
In 1880, the Ballachulish figure, an almost lifesize female figure carved out of an oak log was found near Ballachulish in Scotland. The genitalia are emphasised and pieces of quartz have been inserted as eyes. The figure had been deposited in a ritual context with other objects, within an enclosure marked off with woven branches, similar to cultic finds on the continent. It has been carbon-dated to between 700 and 500 BCE.

== Slavic-speaking areas ==
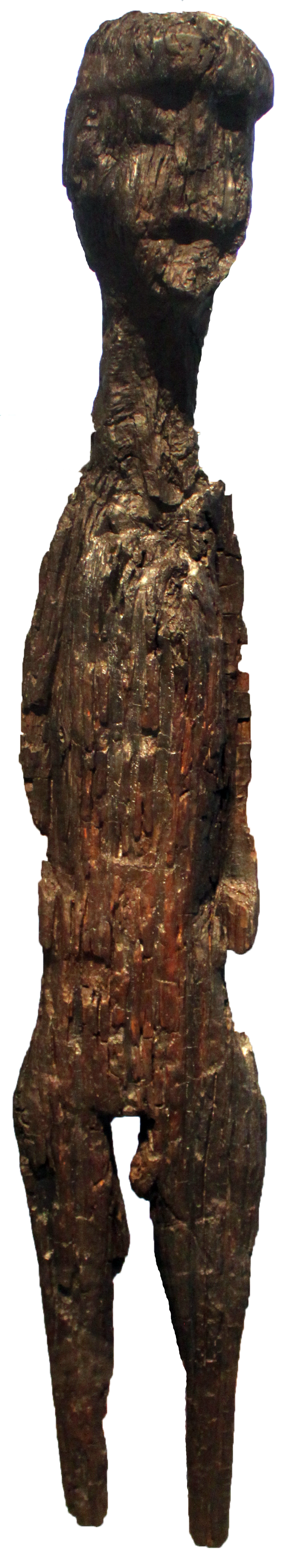
Slavic figure of a god, c. 5th century CE, from Altfriesack, Fehrbellin, Brandenburg, Germany

The several wooden anthropomorphic figures found in the West Slavic settlement areas around the Elbe, for example the temple finds from Groß Raden (now part of Sternberg) and Ralswiek and those from Neubrandenburg, all in Mecklenburg-Vorpommern, and Altfriesack (now part of Fehrbellin, Brandenburg) possibly depict deities. Saxo Grammaticus describes the Temple at Arkona as containing a great four-headed idol, far taller than a man. However, Slavic anthropomorphic figures do not occur until the 10th century, presumably under the influence of neighbouring cultures.

Sebastian Brather distinguishes between idols in plank and pole form. He regards the former as primarily votive in purpose, like those described by Saxo and by others including Thietmar of Merseburg, but their identification with specific deities can only be speculation. Also, as with Celtic and Germanic, Slavic paganism was not universally standardised but included decentralised, local cult centres and practices, of which the wooden images would have formed a part.

Leszek Słupecki considers the figure from Fischerinsel near Neubrandenburg one of the most significant Slavic idols. Dated to the 11th–12th century, it takes the form of a two-headed male bust mounted on a column of hewn oak, and is 178 centimetres (5 ft 10 in) high. The beard, eyes, and nose are emphasised. It is the only multi-headed sculpture extant from a Slavic region, but the location of the find does not indicate any sort of temple or shrine.

== See also ==
- Cenote § Archaeology and anthropology, use of sinkholes in the Yucatán for religious offerings which include wooden figures
- Celtic stone idols
- Roos Carr figures
- Xoanon, ancient Greek wooden statues depicting deities
