= Dagenham idol =

England's oldest wooden statue

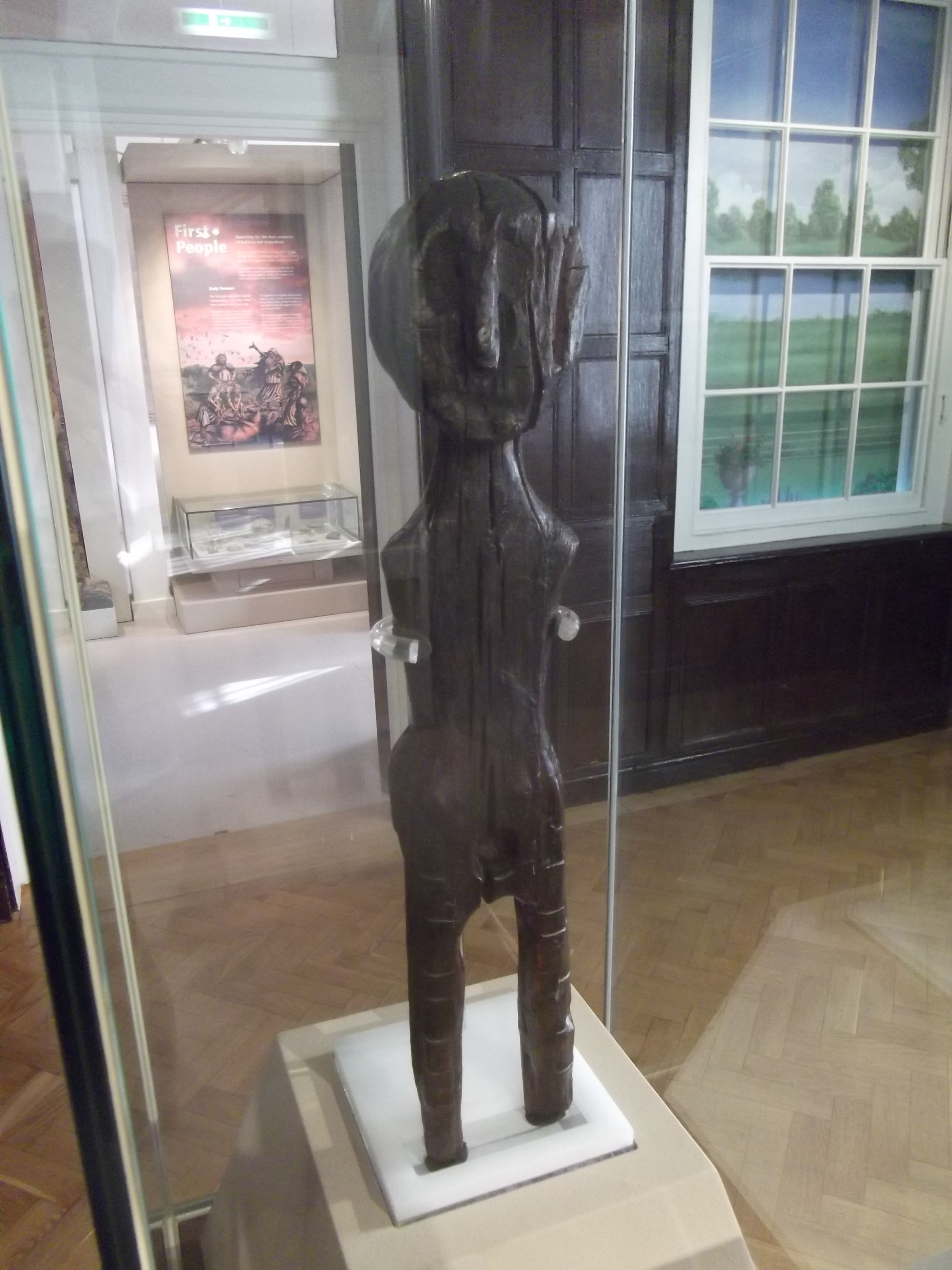
- Dagenham idol at the Valence House Museum in 2011
- Material: Scots pine wood
- Height: 46 cm
- Created: c. 2250 BC
- Discovered: 1922; London, England, United Kingdom

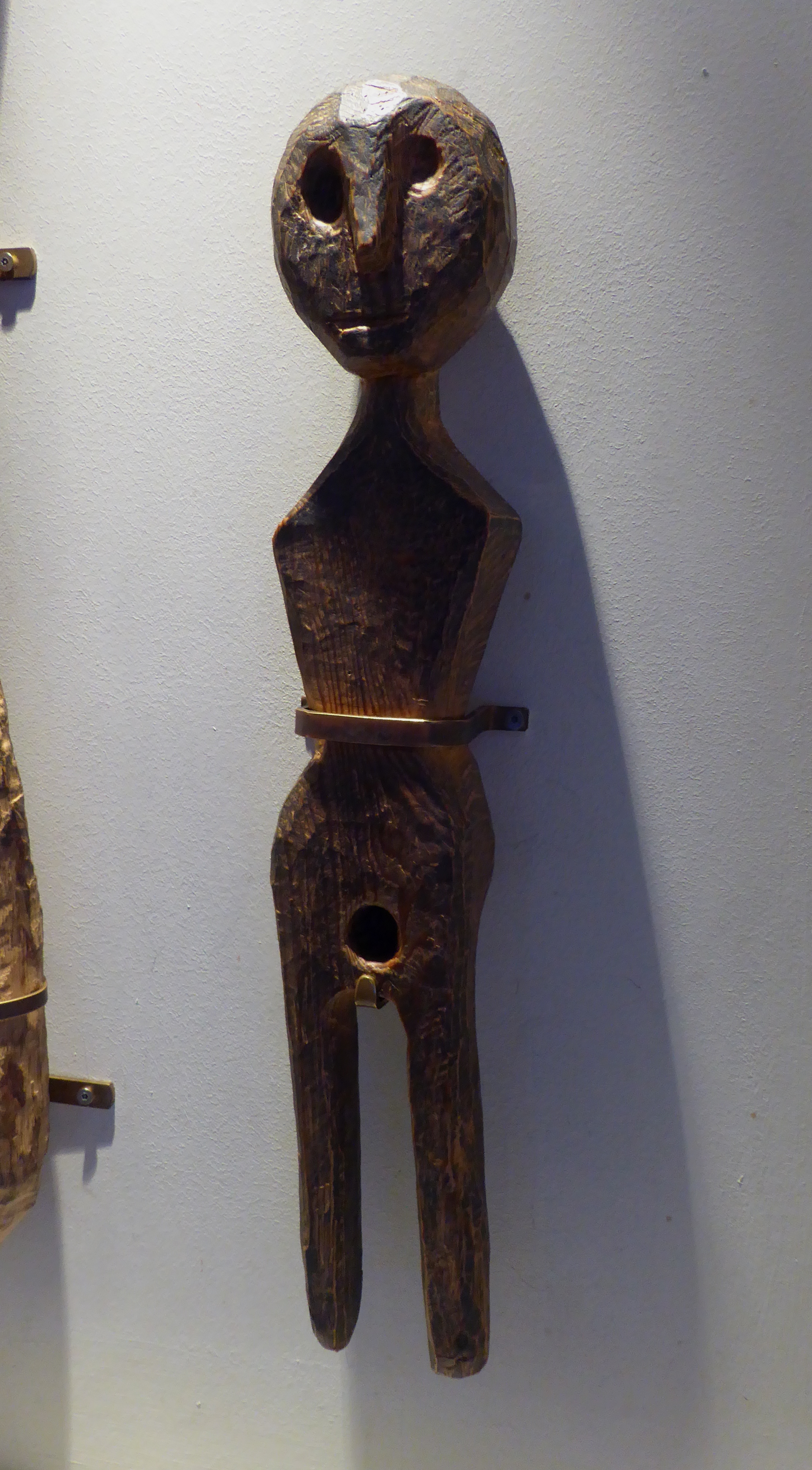
Replica of the Dagenham Idol in the Museum of London in 2018

The Dagenham idol is a wooden statue of a naked human figure, found in Dagenham, East London, England in 1922. It is one of only a handful of prehistoric human-shaped wooden sculptures from the British Isles. The statue has been carbon dated to around 2250 BC, during the late Neolithic period or early Bronze Age, making it one of the oldest human representations found in England.

== Discovery ==
The statue was found in marshland on the north bank of the River Thames to the east of London, south of Ripple Road in Dagenham, during excavation for sewer pipes in 1922, now on the site of Ford Dagenham. It was buried in a layer of peat about 3 metres (9.8 ft) below ground level, near the skeleton of a deer. The statue may have been buried with the deer as a votive fertility sacrifice.

== Description ==
The statue is made of Scots pine and stands 18 inches (46 cm) high. It has two legs but no arms; hips and buttocks narrowing to a waist and then broadening to shoulders; and a rounded head. There are straight markings cut across both legs. A hole in the pubic region can be interpreted as indicating a female, but with the insertion of a phallic peg (now lost) would indicate a male. There appears to be damage to the left eye: while there may not be a direct link, the damage is similar to Odin's sacrifice of an eye at Mímir's Well in return for wisdom in Norse myth; Coles (p.332) suggests "one-eyed Odin can be noted as possible successor to the wooden figures of ambiguous sex and odd left eyes, if no more".

The original statue is owned by Colchester Castle Museum, with a copy in the Museum of London. The original went on indefinite loan to Valence House Museum in Dagenham in 2010.

== See also ==
- Broddenbjerg idol
- Roos Carr figures
- Ralaghan Idol
- Anthropomorphic wooden cult figurines of Central and Northern Europe
