= Ralaghan Idol =

Anthropomorphic carved wooden figure

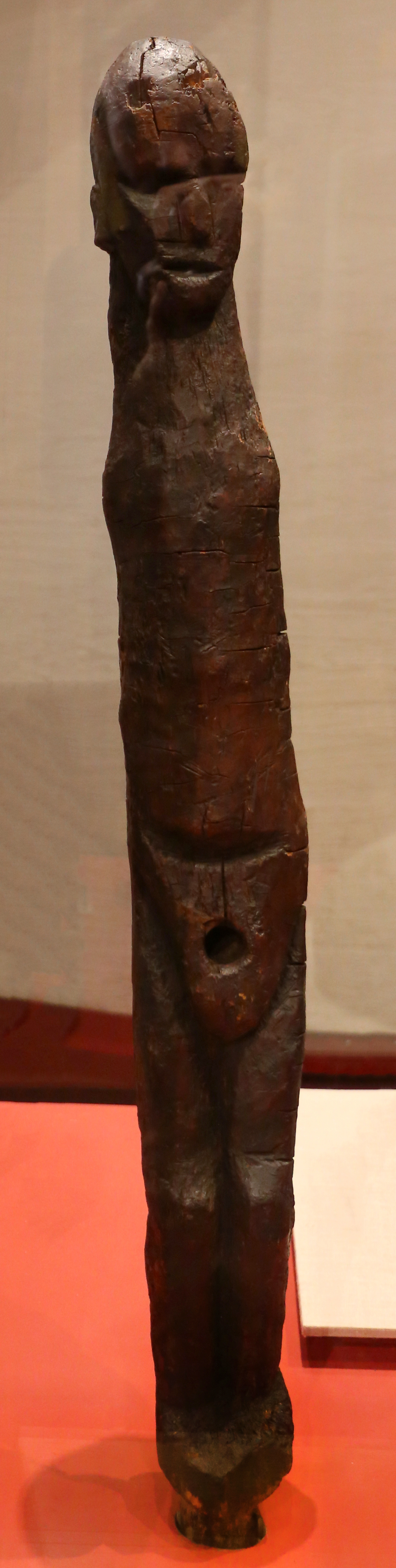
Ralaghan figure

The Ralaghan idol, also known as the "Ralaghan figure", is a late Bronze Age anthropomorphic, carved wooden figure found in a bog in the townland of Ralaghan, County Cavan, Ireland. It is held by the National Museum of Ireland.

A sample of wood from the figure yielded a radiocarbon date (OxA–1719) of 1096–906 cal. BCE.

== Discovery ==
The figure was found during turf cutting, by a farmer named Thomas Halfpenny, aka Mr. Halpin, in a small peat bog close to the townland boundary between Ralaghan and Crossmakeelan, in the civil parish of Shercock, County Cavan, Ireland. Its discovery was announced in 1930 in the journal Antiquity by Adolf Mahr, keeper of Irish Antiquities in the National Museum in Dublin. Mahr reported that the figure was found face down "under 3 to 4 feet of peat" in an area of bog that had been "reclaimed since". No associated archaeological structures were reported, and Mahr reported that no other finds were retrieved from the bog.

== Description ==
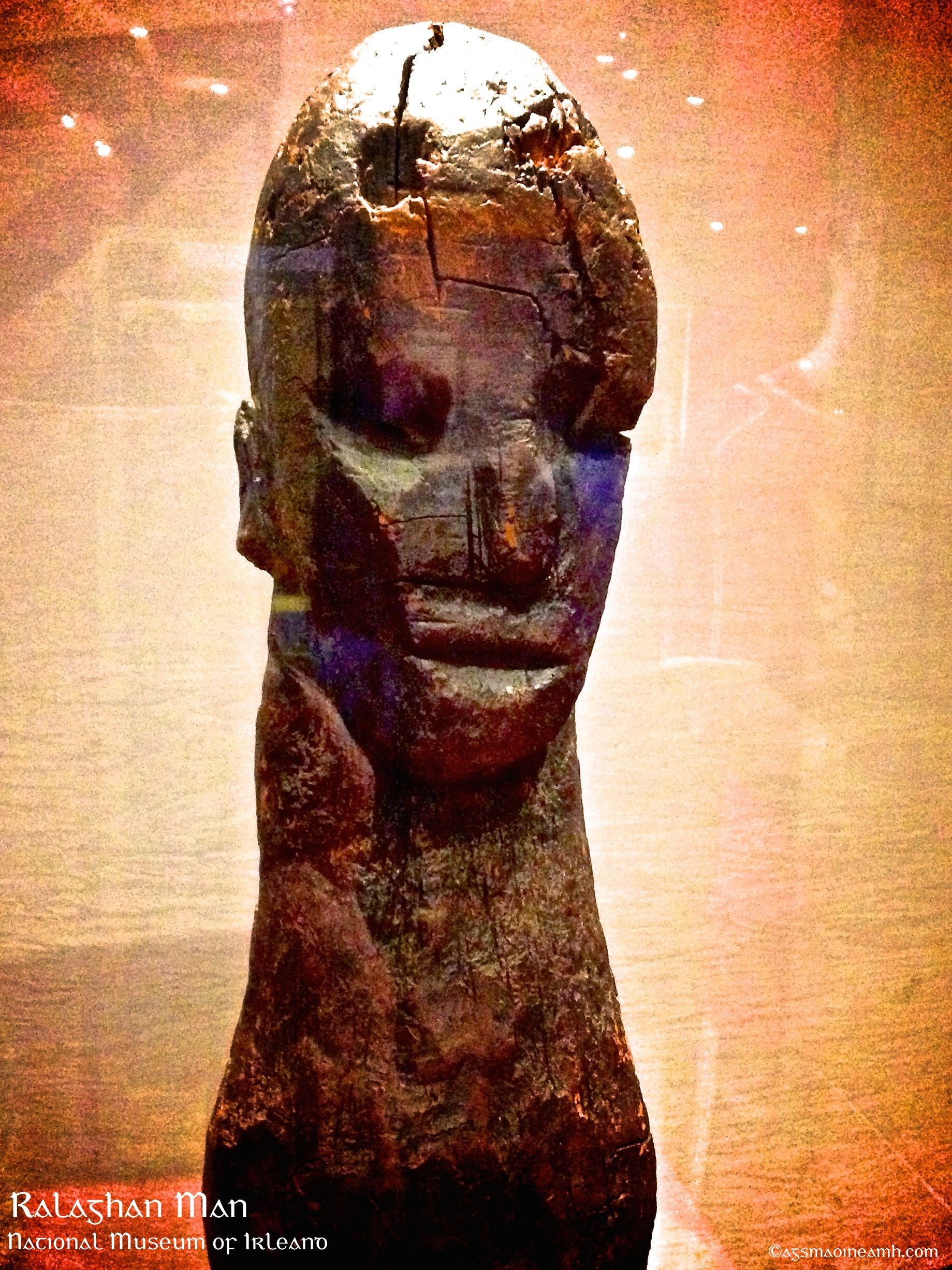
Carved head of the wooden figure

The figure is 113.5 cm long and made from yew (Taxus baccata), a toxic wood with multiple folkloric associations. It is carved from a complete roundwood stem. It has a carved head and neck, a long torso with no arms, breasts or navel, a well defined pubic area and a pair of slightly bent legs that end in feet. The base of the figure ends in a spike and it initially fitted into "a socket cut in a square block-shaped pedestal, about a square foot in area" which Mahr reported "is now lost".

The figure is covered in cracks, and has strongly incised facial features. The left eye is slightly higher than the right, with the nose off-centre and possible damage to the left of the face. The pubic area features a gouged hole (initially reported as drilled) placed within a well defined pubic triangle. An examination of the figure by Bryony Coles published in 1990, determined that the hole widens within the body of the figure and that it contained a small patch of white granular material, possibly quartz.

Mahr initially determined that the pubic hole was "obviously intended for the insertion of a male organ". The idea that the figure originally featured a separate insertable phallus made of wood or some other material has been suggested by several scholars. Others have argued that the figure might be female or deliberately gender ambiguous. Coles has suggested that the pubic hole could have been a "hole for intercourse or giving birth", for the insertion of a separate phallus, or that the figure may have been "deliberately intended to be ambiguous, male in one context and female in another". Similarly, Miranda Aldhouse-Green has argued that the figure may reflect "deliberate ambiguity and double-meaning". The figure is one of several prehistoric wooden figures with both male and female sexual characteristics or whose intended gender is unclear. These include the Dagenham idol, the "God Dolly", and the Roos Carr figures.

== See also ==
- Iron Age wooden cult figures

== Sources ==
- Rynne, Etienn. "The Three Stone Heads at Woodlands, near Raphoe, Co. Donegal". The Journal of the Royal Society of Antiquaries of Ireland, volume 94, no. 2, 1964. JSTOR 25509564
- Waddell, John. The Prehistoric Archaeology of Ireland. Galway: Galway University Press, 1998. ISBN 978-1-8698-5739-4
