= Moccus =

Celtic god identified with Mercury

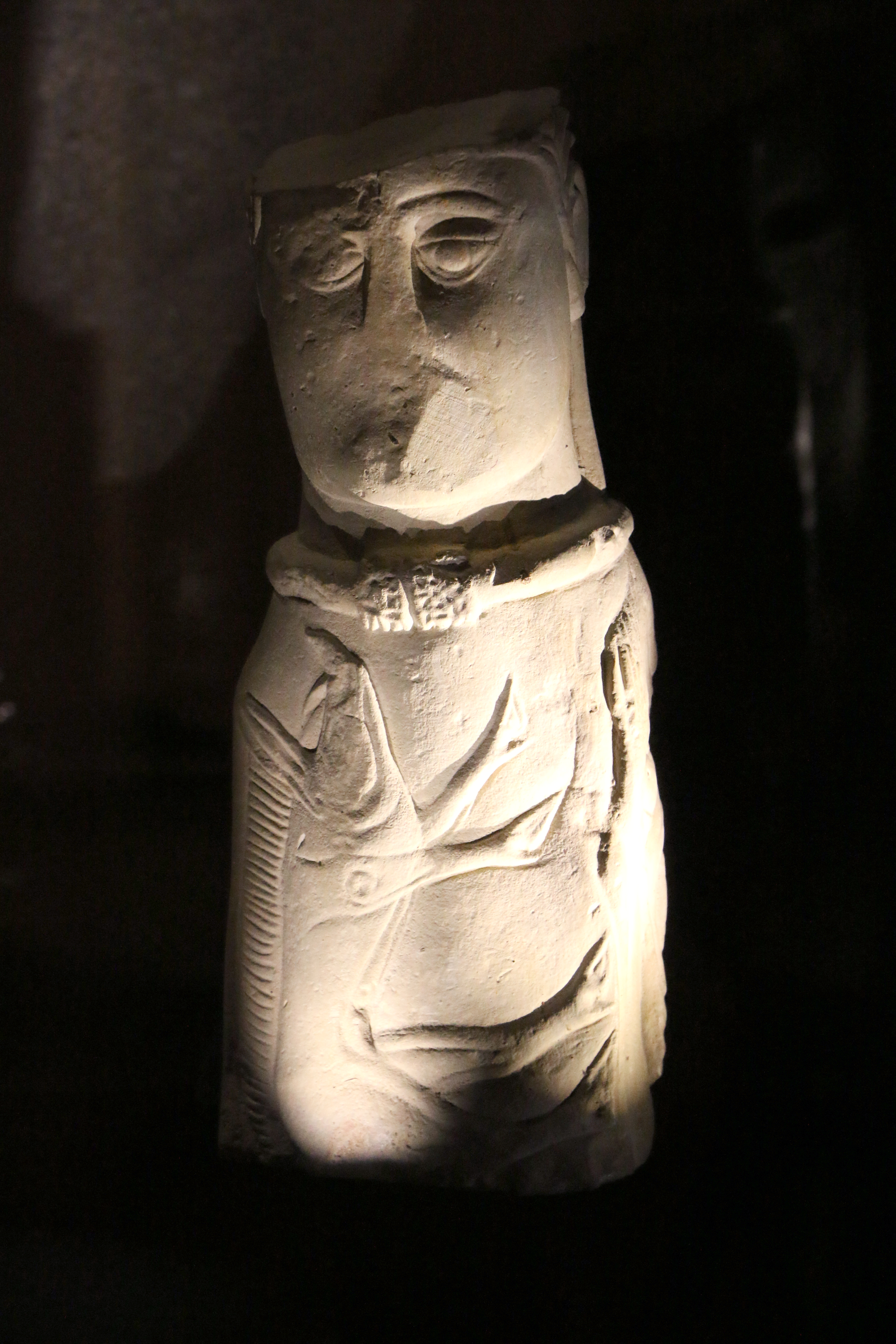
The "God of Euffigneix", a statuette found in the territory of the Lingones which has been connected to Moccus.

Moccus or Moccos is a Celtic god who is attested in one 2nd or 3rd century AD inscription from Langres, in which he is identified with the Roman god Mercury. Moccus has been connected, on etymological grounds, with pigs and boars. The boar was a potent symbol, of the hunt and of war, but also of prosperity.

Langres was a city of the Lingones, a Gallic tribe. The Lingones were perhaps devotees of Moccus. Another indication of boar worship, the Euffigneix statue of a Celtic god with boar-relief on his chest, was found in the territory of the Lingones.

== Background ==
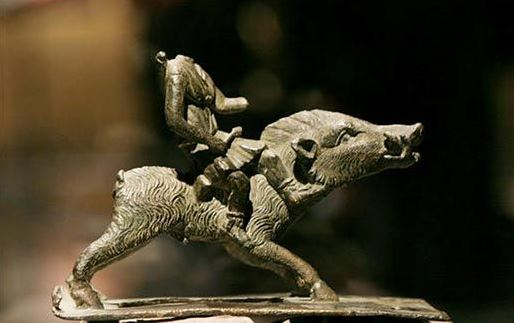
Arduinna, Gallo-Roman goddess of the Ardennes Forest, represented here as a huntress riding a boar.

The Lingones were a Gallic people whose tribal territory was centred on Andemantunnum, modern day Langres. The Lingones were granted Roman citizenship by the end the 1st century AD.

The boar was a potent symbol for the Celts. In Celtic iconography, they were depicted as especially ferocious, with exaggerated dorsal bristles and elongated ears. The boar was a symbol of war. Tacitus tells us that the Aesti (a Germanic or Celtic tribe) wore boar symbols into battle. On the Celtic Gundestrup cauldron, soldiers wear boar crested helmets. The Roman Legion XX, stationed in Chester, adopted the boar as an emblem. It was also a symbol of the hunt. Celtic hunter-gods depicted with boar imagery abound. Arduinna, the goddess of the Ardennes Forest, was often represented as a huntress riding a boar.

The boar was also a symbol of prosperity. Boars were commonly hunted, and perhaps even sacrificed, by the Celts. Strabo tells us that the Celts liked pork and evidence from Iron Age settlements, especially elite graves, amply supports this. In supernatural feasts of Irish mythology, pigs are daily slaughtered, eaten, and then brought back to life by magic.

== Attestation and etymology ==
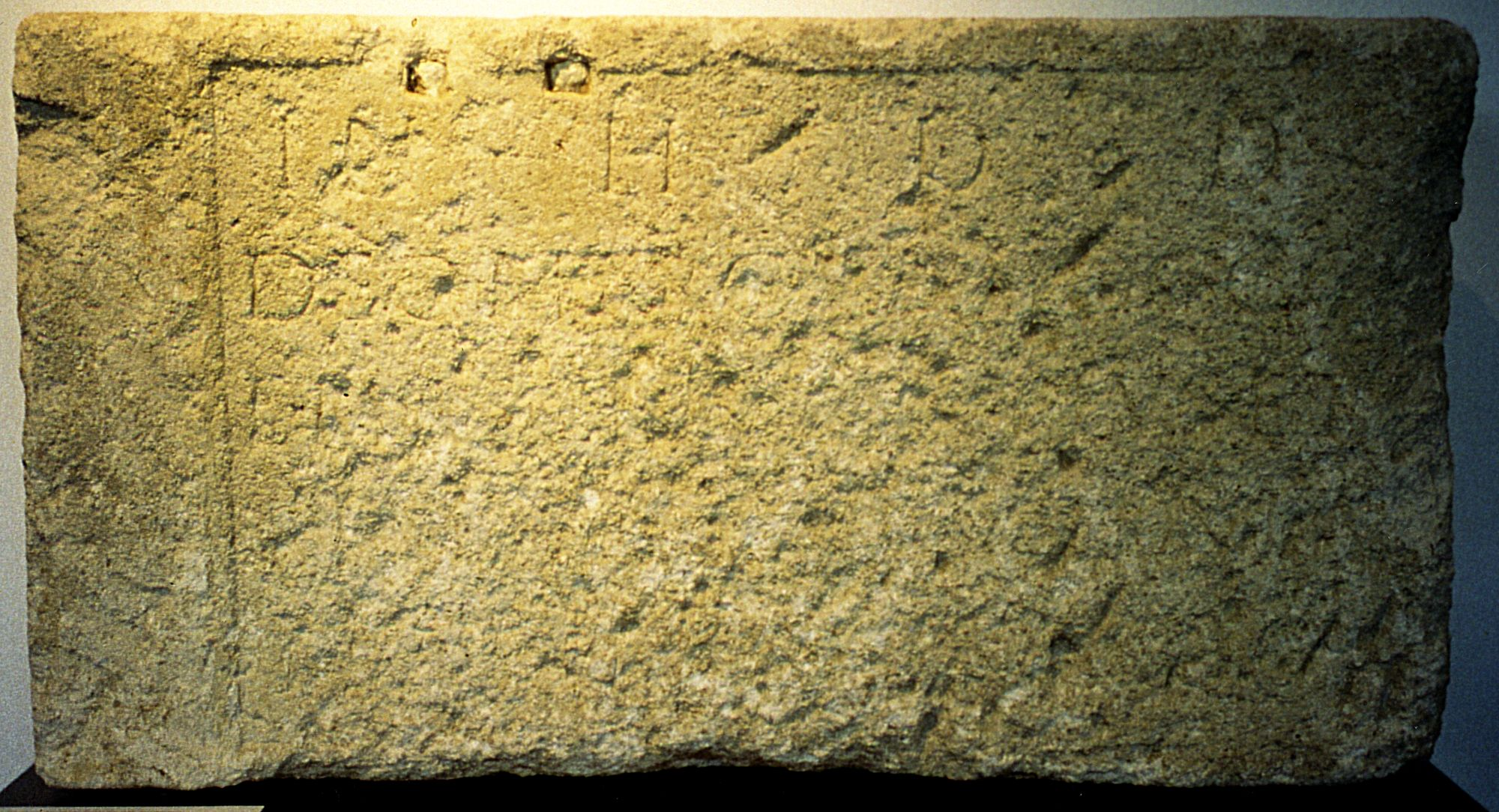
The tabula on which Moccus is attested.

Moccus is known from a single, barely legible votive inscription from Langres. The tabula on which it was inscribed was found in the foundations of a ramp near the Grand Séminaire of Langres, in 1642 or 1645. The inscription has been dated to the late 2nd or 3rd century AD. The inscription reads as follows:

Latin

In h(onorem) d(omus) d(ivinae)
deo Mercur(io) Mocco
L(ucius) Mascl(ius?) Masculus et
Sedatia Blandula
mater ex voto

English

In honour of the divine house,
to Mercury Moccus,
Lucius Masclius Masculus and
Sedatia Blandula,
his mother, [dedicate this] ex voto.

Moccus has been connected with pigs and boars on the basis of this theonym, which has been assumed to derive from a reconstructed Gaulish root word moccos, meaning pig or wild boar. This word is not otherwise attested except in personal names, such as Moccius, Moccia, Mocus, Mocconius, Cato-mocus (literally, war-pig, along similar lines to the personal name Catu-mandus, war-horse). However the word is evidenced by Celtic cognates, such as Old Irish mucc (pig), Welsh moch (pigs) and Old Cornish mehin (bacon). Cognates are not attested in other Indo-European branches, so the word probably entered proto-Celtic from a non-Indo-European substrate.

However, not all scholars have been convinced of this etymology and of Moccus's association with boars. Joshua Whatmough suggests that the theonym derives from a place name, perhaps that of nearby Moque or Le Moche. Garrett Olmsted explains "Moccos" as a k-reflex of *makukuo-, proto-Celtic for child (and thus cognate to Irish macc and Welsh map).

== Connections ==
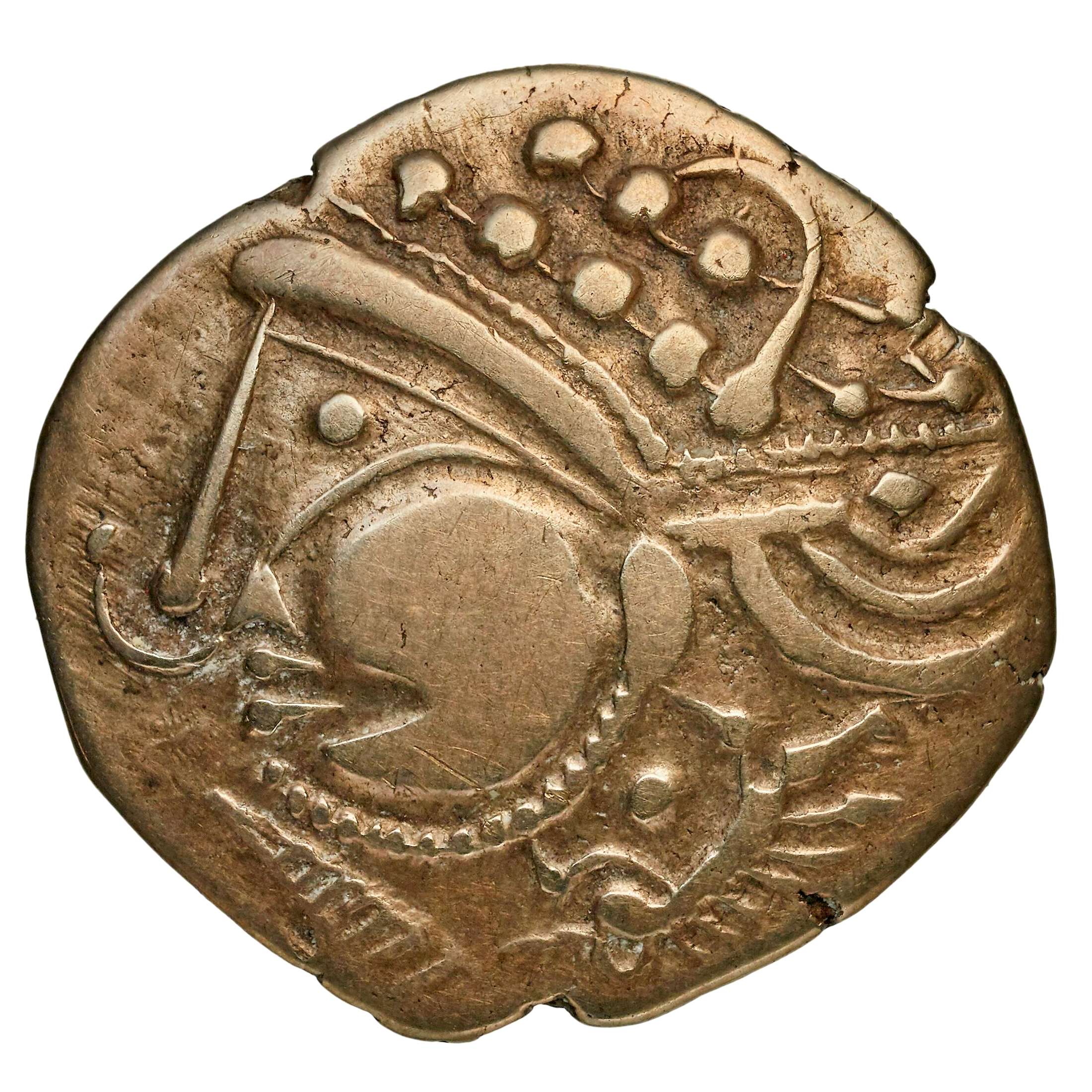
A stater of the Eburovices which has been connected with the Euffigneix statue.

Scholars such as Émile Thévenot and Philippe Jouët have connected Moccus with the Euffigneix statue (sometimes called the God of Euffigneix), a Celtic sculpture found in Euffigneix and dating to around the 1st century BC (early in the Roman occupation of Gaul). The statue depicts a torc-wearing figure with a large wild boar vertically over his torso. Such abstract animal imagery allows the statue to be identified as a depiction of a god. Thévenot points out that Euffigneix would have lain in the tribal territory of the Lingones. The Euffigneix statue has in turn been connected with the iconography on a coin of the Eburovices of Évreux, in which an upside-down boar appears on the neck of a torc-wearing human.

Another Celtic god associated with Mercury, the bear-god Artaius, is known from an inscription in Beaucroissant, Isère. Celticist Miranda Green suggests both were gods associated with hunting, perhaps protectors of those who hunted their respective animals.

James MacKillop suggests that Moccus is connected with the Gaulish Mercury, a figure attested in Roman sources and usually identified with the Celtic god Lugus. Jouët connects Moccus with the Irish myth in Oidheadh Chlainne Tuireann, in which Lugh (Irish Lugus) obtains the pig-skin of Tuis, which could heal any injury. Gwenaël Le Duc has suggested that both this inscription and the Euffigneix statue attest to Lugus.

== Bibliography ==
- Allen, D. F. (1976). "Some Contrasts in Gaulish and British Coins". In Duval, P.-M.; Hawkes, C. F. C. (eds.). Celtic Art in Ancient Europe. London / New York: Seminar Press. pp. 265–282. ISBN 978-0-12-785180-8.
- Green, Miranda (1989). Symbol and Image in Celtic Religious Art. London and New York: Routledge. ISBN 0-415-08076-2.
- Green, Miranda (1997). Dictionary of Celtic Myth and Legend. London: Thames and Hudson Ltd. ISBN 978-0500279755.
- Jouët, Philippe (2012). Dictionnaire de mythologie et de la religion celtiques. Yoran Embanner. ISBN 978-2-914855-92-1.
- Kiernan, Philip (2020). Roman Cult Images: The Lives and Worship of Idols from the Iron Age to Late Antiquity. Cambridge University Press.
- Thévenot, Émile (1968). Divinités et sanctuaires de la Gaule. Fayard.
