= Kūlgrinda (disambiguation) =

Kūlgrinda is a secret underwater causeway in the history of Lithuania.

Kūlgrinda may also refer to one of the following.

- Kūlgrinda (band), a Lithuanian pagan folk band
- Kūlgrinda, a 1984 historical novel by Petras Dirgėla
