= Opfermoor Vogtei =

Coordinates: 51°9′55″N 10°26′43″E

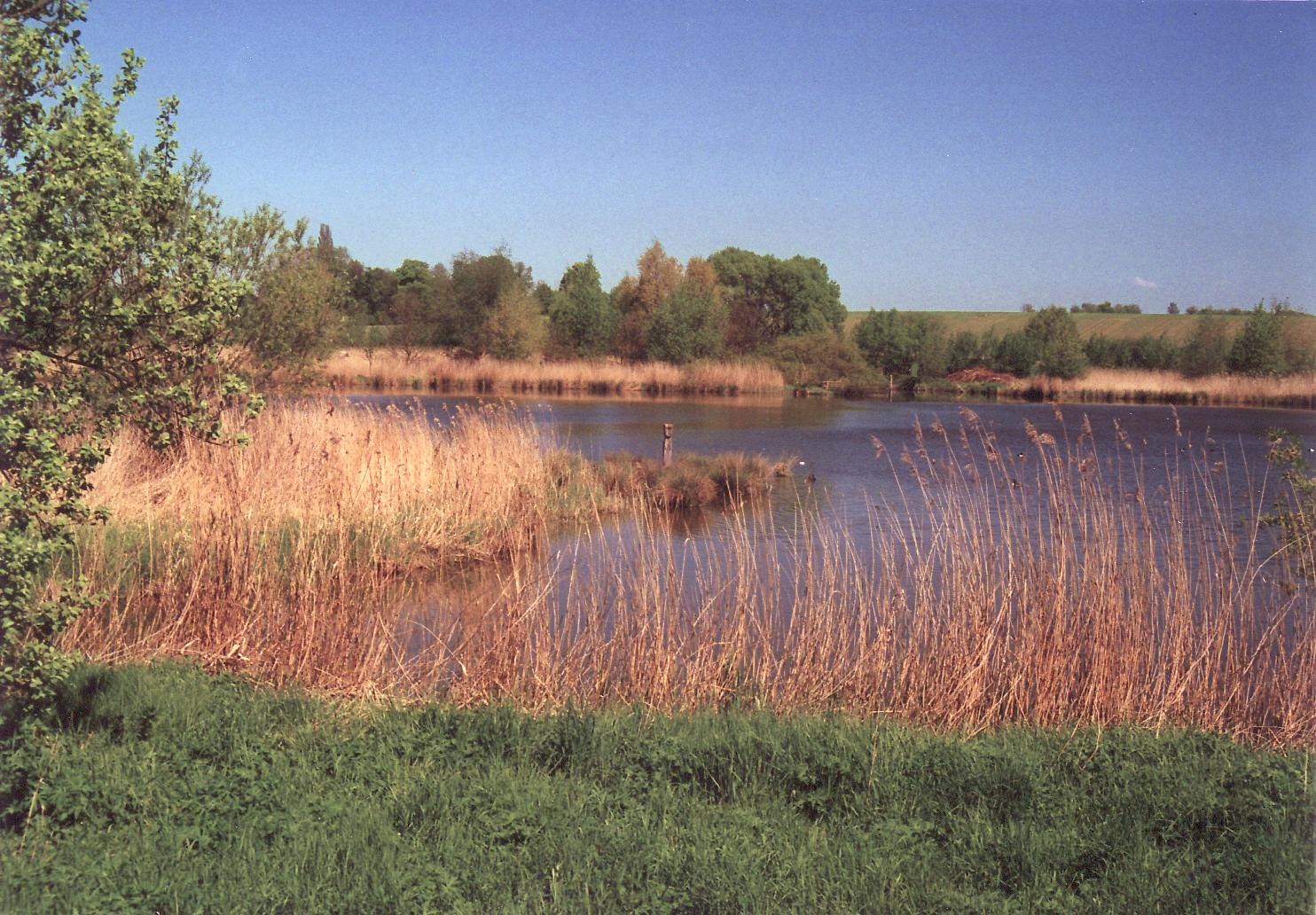
Opfermoor Vogtei: stylised cult figurine on the lakeshore promontory

The Opfermoor Vogtei is an open-air museum at the location of a prehistoric and protohistoric sacrificial bog (German: Opfermoor) in the municipality of Vogtei, Thuringia, in Germany. It lies within the former municipality of Oberdorla, approximately 200 metres (220 yd) from Niederdorla, and the site is also known by those names.

The site, which includes a shallow lake, was a supra-regional cult site from the Hallstatt Period (6th century BCE) to the Migration Age (5th century CE) developed by people whose descendants became, in Friedrich Maurer's nomenclature, the Rhine-Weser Group of Germanic people. It is the largest known Iron Age cult site in Central Europe and has yielded important information about pre-Germanic and Germanic religious practices. Excavations took place there between 1957 and 1964, and recovered artifacts and reconstructions of shrines are presented in an open-air museum on the site, which includes a reconstructed village, and an associated museum in Niederdorla.

== Site ==
The site is a natural depression in which groundwater collected, forming a marsh and an area of open water roughly 700 by 200 metres (2,300 ft × 660 ft) in extent; beginning around 100 BCE as established by studies of the sediment layers and peat, sedimentation reduced the extent of open water. Peat cutting began in 1947 and has again increased the size of the lake; the prehistoric discoveries were made during peat harvesting.

== Archaeological investigation ==
Peat cutting began at the site in 1947, leading to the discovery of archaeological deposits the following year. From 1957 until 1964, the site was excavated under the leadership of Günter Behm-Blancke, the director of the Museum für Ur- und Frühgeschichte Thüringens (Museum of the Prehistory and Protohistory of Thuringia) in Weimar, revealing circular enclosures of hazel branches, in the centre of which were altars with wooden cult figurines. Numerous bones of domesticated animals were found, above all of cattle but also including horses, sheep, goats, pigs, and a domestic cat; some wild animals: deer, bison, wolves, wild boar, otters, at least 27 pike, a fox, and a turtle; and 35 species of domesticated and wild birds. There were also human bones (from at least 40 different individuals), with the damage to the latter indicating human sacrifice: in one case in particular, the head and extremities had been hacked off and sunk in the bog, weighted down with branches, and the tools used had also been broken and sunk. The finds at this site are the best known archaeological evidence of Germanic human sacrifice. In addition there were a cultic boat, weapons which had presumably been used to make the sacrifice, harvest offerings such as bundles of flax, a variety of everyday objects and tools, and pieces of wood with worked ends that were probably used for divination in association with the sacrifices. In all at least 86 distinct cultic locations have been identified on-site. The finds originate from various parts of Roman Germania, and are not associated with any one Germanic tribe, suggesting a cult-place serving more than the immediate region. The circular cult-place was built by the Hermunduri in the 1st century BCE and became an important religious centre during the Migration Age.

The largest prehistoric settlement in Thuringia was excavated nearby at the Mallinden. The reconstructed buildings at the museum are based on examples found there.

== Interpretation ==
Dating of the finds showed the site to have been used for cultic purposes from the Hallstatt Period (6th century BCE) to long after the arrival of Christianity, with isolated depositions in the 11th and 12th centuries CE. Behm-Blancke identified five different modes of sacrifice (pulverised bones scattered on the ground; carefully cleaned, entire bones either piled or buried at the lakeside, with the skull on top or placed on a pole; leg-bones placed together beside a knocked-down offering pole, or tied together, with no skull present; leg-bones and skull deposited together in the lake, presumed to have been originally the animal's hide with legs and head intact, placed on a pole; skull alone, either placed on a pole or deposited on the ground or in the lake), and distinguished bog, lake, lakeside and spring sacrifices. The cultic nature of the depositions is clear, although opinions have varied as to whether the isolated bones, particularly skulls, represent simple offerings or the remains of sacramental feasts, which given the absence of some parts of the skeleton would have taken place elsewhere.

=== Hallstatt Period ===
The religious centre of the site in the early period is a rectangular altar of Muschelkalk limestone surrounded by a semicircular wall made of rocks and earth. Vessels containing food offerings were placed on the altar and a fire was lit. Buds on the charcoal remnants of the wood indicate a springtime ritual, likely in honour of a vegetation deity. The altar is comparable to contemporary and older finds in the northwestern Alps and to early Greek altars.

Beside the altar was a circular shrine surrounded by a wall, in the centre of which was an image in the form of a stele; goats and other animals had been sacrificed there. There are also small oval sacrificial sites marked off by rocks or branches, dating to the late Hallstatt Period. Some of these contained simple wooden idols, one of which had a decorated neck-ring. A large loom weight indicated a female divinity. Painted pottery shows typological kinship with Rhineland examples.

=== La Tène Period ===
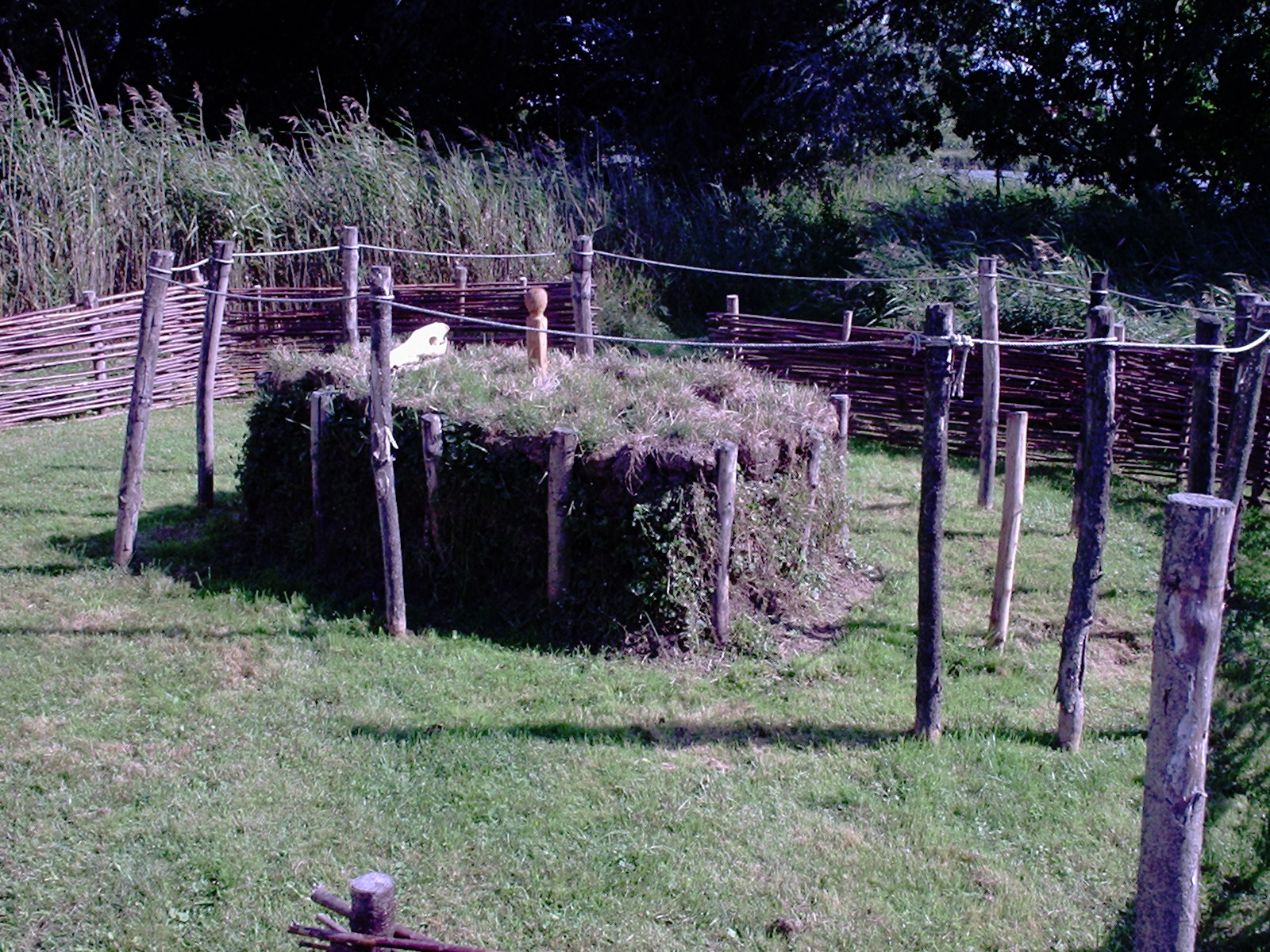
Reconstruction of a sod altar with bovine skull and pole idol

During the middle and late La Tène Period, a small lake developed at the site, and over centuries became the focus of sacrifice there: numerous wooden idols of varying form were set up at the edge of the water until the Migration Period. Cultic observances continued in the late Migration Age after the lake shrank as a result of sedimentation.

During the La Tène Period, the descendants of the Hallstatt Period inhabitants were affected by Celtic cultural influences. Apsoidal enclosures, as are found for example in the Trier temple area, became common. These enclosed altars made of blocks of sod or soil supported by wickerwork, with a tall post or a simple stick-figure cult image on the top. Cultic staffs used by the priests were associated with the altars. After a short time this Celtic-influenced arrangement was superseded by a "sacred place" with a phallus and a female forked-stick cult figurine—although Rudolf Simek has pointed out that fragmentary figurines from this site are in some cases interpreted as female on the basis of long hair and/or clothing, which may not have been so intended. These represent cult places of Germanic migrants, whose pottery indicates that they came from the area of the rivers Oder and Warta.

=== Germanic Period ===
==== 1st century BCE ====
The Hermunduri appeared in northern Thuringia at the end of the 1st century BCE. They created a large circular cultic area at the site, with small enclosures, which also contained cultic posts and an image made from a forked stick. The cultic area underwent two periods of construction. At its centre was a large rectangular wooden altar with corner posts; numerous bones from sacrificed animals were found near it. Skull fragments from human sacrifices were found on the western edge of the cultic area. On its northern side were two unusual sacrificial sites with a sword set upright in the ground and a human skull. Tacitus mentions a conflict between the Hermunduri and the Chatti on the River Werra as having taken place at about this time. After the battle, which was won by the Hermunduri, sacrifices continued at the lake site.

==== Roman Period ====
During the mid-Roman Period, use of the site focused on the veneration of various deities distinguished by their idols and attributes, which took place in shared circular shrines. In the 3rd century CE, this format was superseded by a single shrine, in which a wooden cult image of a goddess was placed near the altar. A sowilo rune found on a vessel may indicate her name. The figure shows Gallo-Roman influence and may be compared to Diana, to whom deer and swine were also sacrificed. A craftsmen's settlement at Haarhausen (Amt Wachsenburg) and sacrifices of oxen and offerings at the cemetery in Haßleben indicate influence on the Hermunduri via workers from the region of the Roman Limes. The shrine contained a coffin with a female skeleton inside; the grave was destroyed in the 4th century, possibly during the disturbances associated with the formation of the Thuringii.

==== Migration Age ====
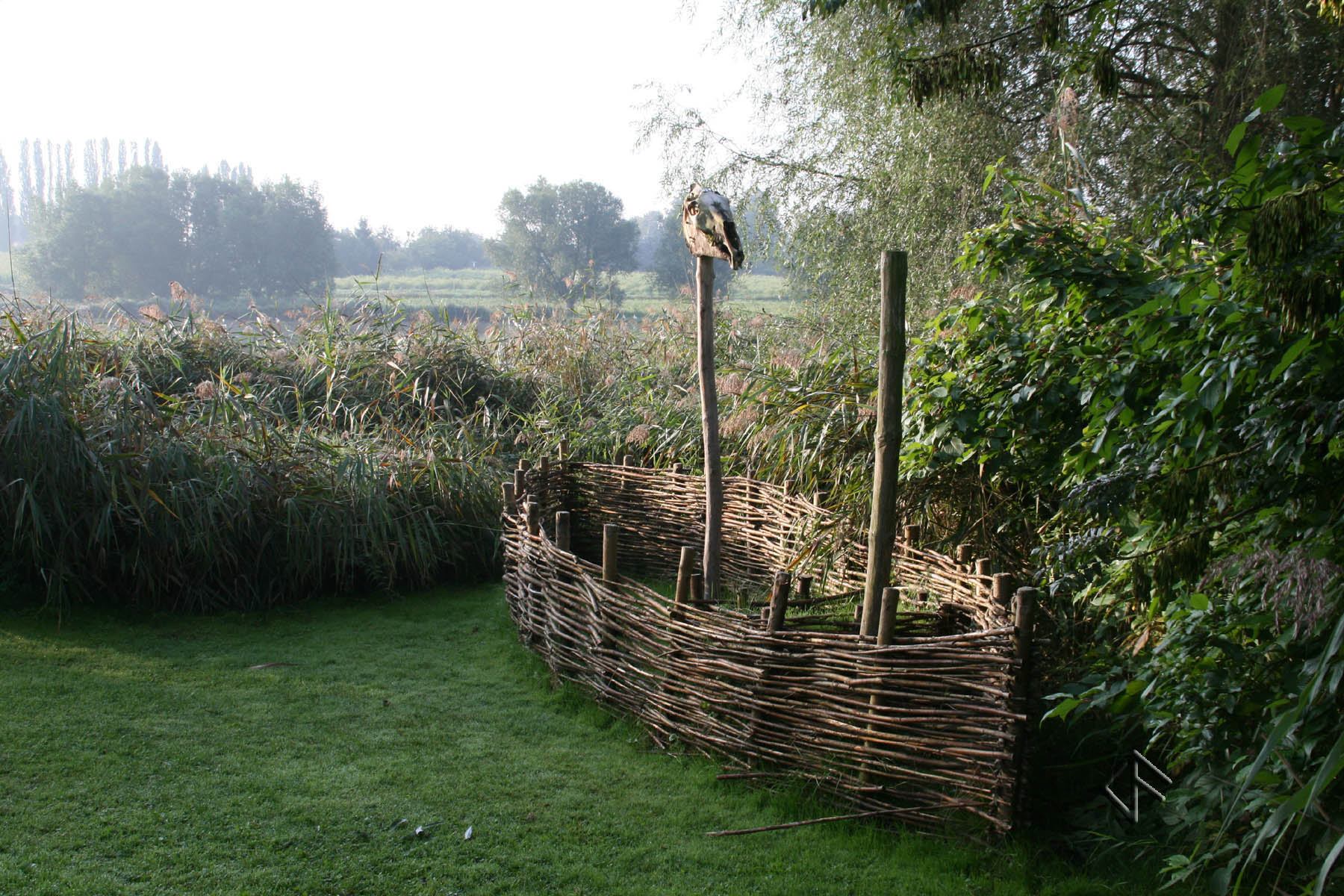
Recreation of 5th-century ship shrine

In the 5th century, two ship shrines were created at the site. The larger was formed of branches with a hole indicating the steering oar and was associated with a male divinity, who was represented by a tall post idol surmounted by a horse's head. The smaller ship shrine had a sacrifice of cattle and was dedicated to a goddess. Ship shrines are also attested from earlier periods. In the late Migration Age, the site was a major sacrificial location. Several offerings were found within, but no idols. At some point, the enclosure was destroyed by fire.

==== Medieval Period ====
The archaeological evidence does not support continuous use after the early Holy Roman Empire, but 10th- and 11th-century pottery and dog bones indicate sacrifices at the site even after the introduction of Christianity. Heathen observances died out after the foundation of the Archdiaconate of Oberdorla, which was probably a response to the presence of the widely important heathen site.

== Significance of finds ==
With the assistance of comparative research and of evidence from older discoveries relating to religious practices in Europe, the finds at the site have contributed to new understanding of cult practices in the region in the Hallstatt, La Tène, Roman and Migration Ages, including:

- Construction and form of shrines, including enclosures and evidence of huts which may have sheltered the cult images
- Types of offering poles and cult images
- Ritual tools, particularly hammers or axes and clubs
- Animal sacrifice to male and female divinities (including specific issues such as the incidence of horse sacrifice and comparison of the animals sacrificed with those consumed in the adjacent settlement)
- Human sacrifice with dismemberment
- Attributes of deities (such as types of hammer)
- Turf altars and altar tables

It is also possible to compare the elements of proto-Germanic and Germanic cult practice at Oberdorla with local customs which may be in part survivals of heathen traditions.

The extensive preserved material at the site also provide valuable information about diet, animal husbandry, and material culture. In particular, the large numbers of well-preserved animal remains are an important source of information on the nature and size of domesticated animals during the periods when they were sacrificed, including the spread of house cats from areas of Roman settlement into non-Roman Germanic areas. In part because of excavation problems, it is also one of the few inland Central European sites where remains of fish have been recovered: pike and some tench. In addition there are fragments of a fish trap and of hand nets and well-preserved harpoons and fish hooks consisting of a sharpened stick which was turned with a tug on the line after being swallowed in the bait. The site also yielded one of the earliest known Germanic bows and a five-hole weaving tablet.

== Museum ==
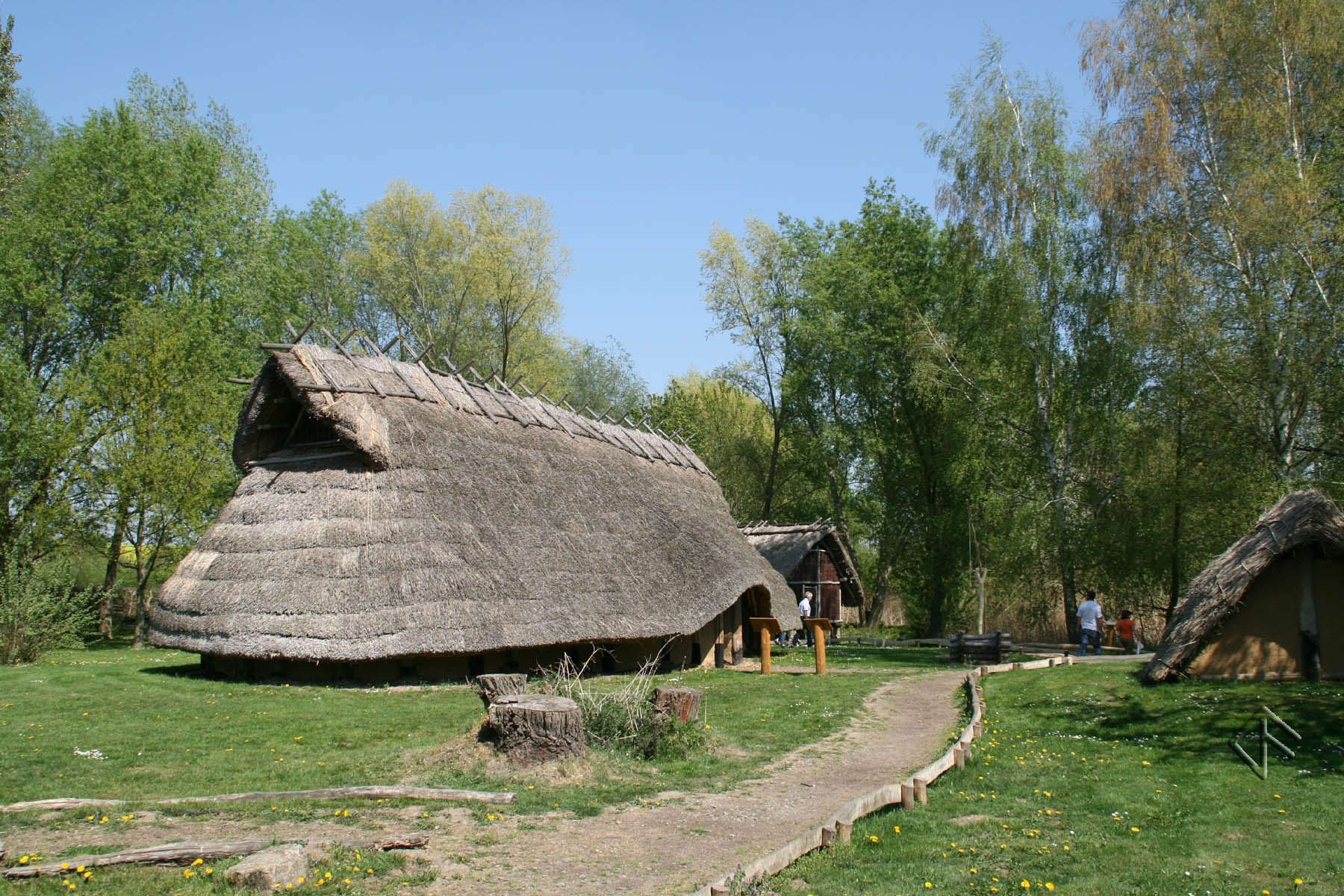
Reconstructed 3rd-century Germanic village

Some of the discoveries from the excavation are on display at the Opfermoor Museum on the northern edge of Oberdorla, including the skeletal remains of a woman with her skull on a stake, reproducing the way she was found. In the open-air museum itself, which opened in July 1992, are ten reconstructions of shrines from various periods and also a reconstruction of a 3rd-century Germanic village, consisting of a longhouse (housing for humans and their livestock), three Grubenhäuser (pit-houses) and a barn. The museum offers periodic presentations and classes in ancient Germanic clothing, weaponry, cookery and baking, spinning and weaving, and games. A Germanic festival and a Roman market take place on-site in alternating years, with costumed living history reenactors seeking to recreate everyday life in one or the other context. Neo-Pagans have also held rituals at the site.

In addition, the district museum in Mühlhausen, the Museum am Lindenbühl, has an exhibit about the site, and Günter Behm-Blanke's papers and some of the discoveries from the site are in the Museum für Ur- und Frühgeschichte Thüringens in Weimar.

A display on the early history of the Hainich region based primarily on discoveries at the site is planned for the Hainich National Park near Kammerforst.

In 2012, to mark the 20th anniversary of the museum's opening and in Behm-Blancke's centenary year, a memorial stone to him was erected at the museum village.
