= Kūlgrinda =

Manmade track across swamps, found in and around Lithuania

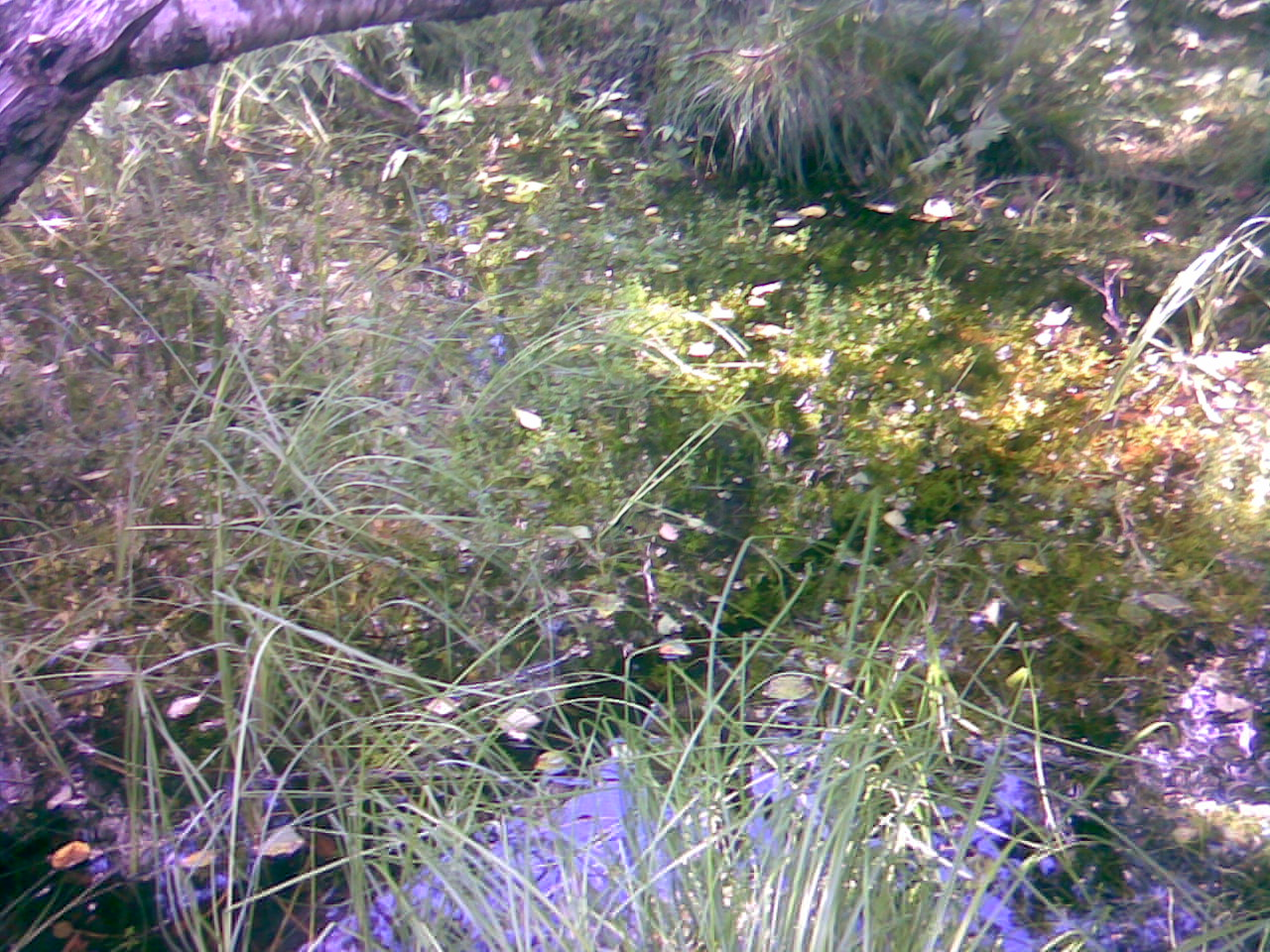
Kulgrinda by Medvėgalis hillfort

Kūlgrinda (plural kūlgrindos; from the Samogitian kūlis 'stone' and grinda 'pavement', itself from grįsti 'to rake, pull together') is a hidden, usually winding, underwater stony road or ford across swamps, swampy areas, lakes, or along rivers, used as a defense in the lands of Baltic tribes, in particular, in the history of Lithuania. Similar secret roads made primarily of wood and ground were known as medgrinda (from medis, 'tree') and žemgrinda (from žemė, 'earth, ground') respectively. Old Prussians are known to have built kulgrindas already in the first centuries (of Common Era), while the Lithuanian ones are dated to the Middle Ages.

== Function and construction ==
Undetectable from the surface, these roads were usually known only to the locals, and as such were an important element of the defense against various invaders, including the Teutonic Knights in the 13–14th centuries. Kūlgrindas provided safe shortcuts between villages, hillforts, and other defensive structures. They were built by bringing stones, wood, or gravel over frozen swamps in the winter and letting them sink once the ice melted. Such procedure would be repeated several times. Sometimes wooden posts were inserted to protect the elevated area from washing away.

== Surviving examples ==
The remnants of kūlgrindas are most often found in the territory of Lithuania, but also in Kaliningrad Oblast (former East Prussia), Belarus, and Latvia. It is estimated that Lithuania has 27 kūlgrindas and 7 medgrindas, about half of them in Samogitia.

The longest and best-known surviving kūlgrinda is Sietuva kulgrinda in Samogitia. It survived in three segments: the middle segment across the Sietuva swamp and along the Sietuva stream between lakes Lūkstas and Paršežeris and two segments on higher grounds: the noertheastern and southwestern parts. It was used up to the 19th century as a road between Kaltinėnai and Tverai. One of the first to investigate the Sietuva kūlgrinda was Ludwik Krzywicki.

Other kūlgrindas are found in the Amalvas swamp in southern Lithuania and at Šiuraičiai near Priekulė. The Alkupis kūlgrinda near Kvėdarna was severely damaged during land amelioration by Soviet authorities. The oldest medgrinda was found in Kernavė and is dated to the 4–7th centuries.

== See also ==
- Timber trackway
  - Corduroy road
  - Wittemoor timber trackway
  - Wittmoor bog trackway
