= Braak Bog Figures =

Two wooden carvings discovered in Braak, Northern Germany

Coordinates: 54.1034°N 10.5931°E

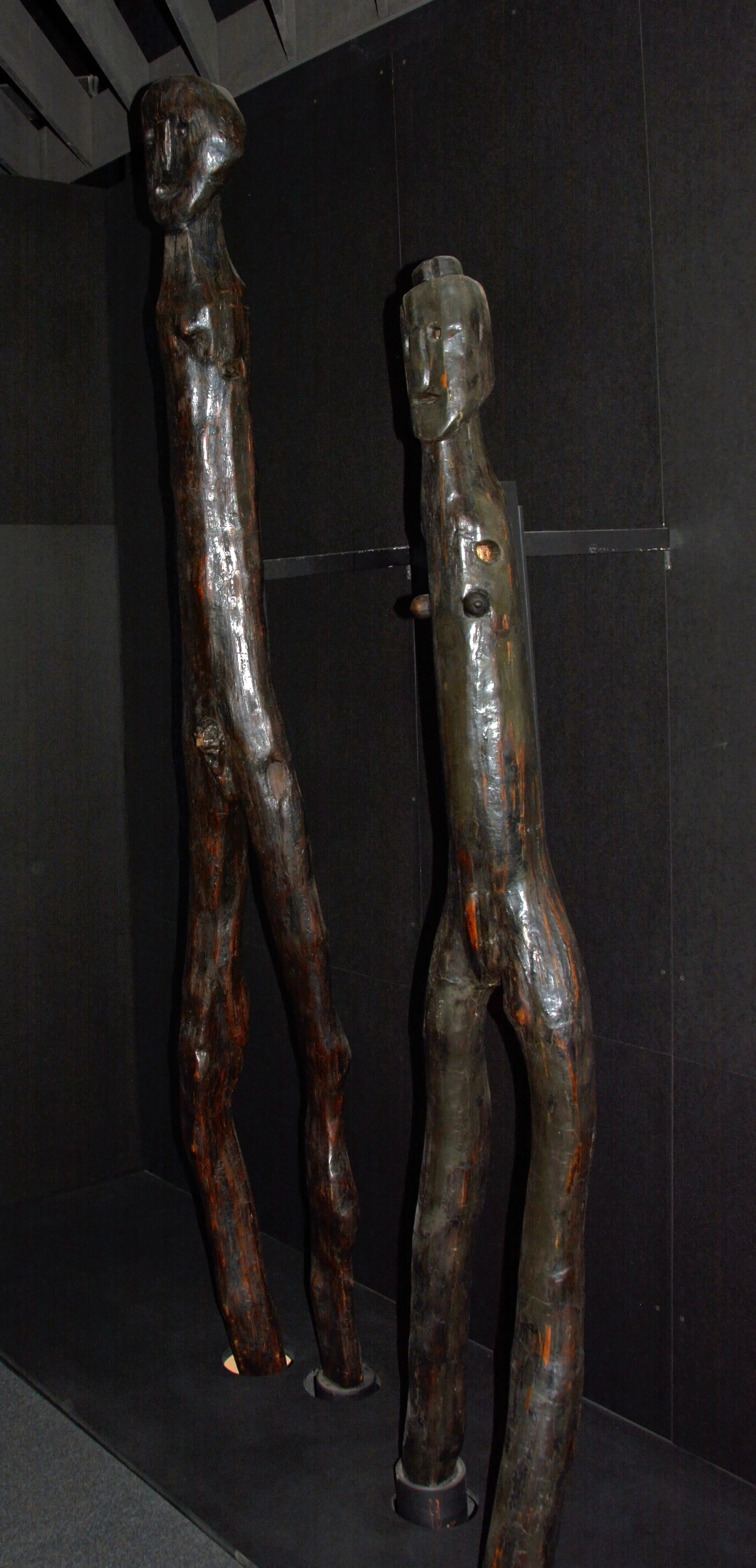
Braak Bog Figures in the Schleswig-Holstein state archaeology museum at Gottorf Castle.

The Braak Bog Figures are two wooden carvings discovered in 1947 in a peat bog in Braak, Schleswig-Holstein, Northern Germany. Part of a larger tradition of similar figures spanning the period from the Neolithic to the Middle Ages, they are human-like in appearance and have been carbon dated to the 2nd or 3rd century BCE; the Schleswig-Holstein state archaeology museum puts them as far back as 400BCE. Several hypotheses have been proposed to explain their function and what they may represent, from depictions of deities to ancestor worship.

== Appearance and dating ==
Carved from carefully selected naturally forked oak branches, the figures are human-like and are 275 centimetres (108 in) (male) and 230 centimetres (91 in) (female) in height. They have sockets for arms (the appendages are missing) and pebbles may have been used for their eyes. The figures exhibit marked sexual dimorphism: in addition to the difference in height, the female has her hair in a topknot and the male has short hair with bangs, and the sexual organs are emphasized. The breasts of the female figure are "set in separately" and the male figure's genital had been "struck off". The noses are also differentiated, but both have open mouths as if screaming. Fires had repeatedly been built near the site of the find.

The Braak figures are carbon dated to the 3rd to 2nd century BCE, but have also been dated to the early 4th century BCE. They are among several anthropomorphic wooden figures of varying form unearthed from the Neolithic and into the Middle Ages, in areas of Northern Europe ranging from Schleswig-Holstein in Germany to Norrland in Sweden. The majority of these figures date to the Iron Age and the Roman period. Of these, the Braak Bog Figures are the largest found in Germany, and Malcolm Todd calls them the "most imposing".

== Interpretations ==
Fokke Sierksma commented in 1960 that as the figures were found together in a peat bog, near a pile of stones containing fragments of pottery and evidence of fire, these find circumstances "together with the considerable dimension of the figures, and the combination of a male and a female figure, make it virtually certain that they represent deities of Northern Germanic tribes. These located the residence of their gods in peat bogs, and regarded the sacred union of a fertility god and a fertility goddess as prerequisite for the continued propagation of life in all its forms".

Hilda Ellis Davidson (1975) comments that these figures may represent a "Lord and Lady" of the Vanir, a group of Norse gods, and that "another memory of [these wooden figures] may survive in the tradition of the creation of Ask and Embla, the man and woman who founded the human race, created by the gods from trees on the seashore". It is also possible to regard them as part of ancestor worship.

Malcolm Todd (2009) comments that the Braak Bog Figures and other similar bog figures have a "significance [that is] difficult to determine but [they] should be related to the supra-mundane and perhaps specifically to the presiding deities of fertility and war".

== Current location and controversy ==
The Braak Bog Figures are in the Schleswig-Holstein state archaeology museum at Gottorf Castle. The post-war conservator there, Karl Schlabow, has been accused of over-restoring archaeological exhibits, including accentuating the sexual characteristics of the Braak figures.

== See also ==
- Bog body, human bodies placed in peat bogs
- Hörgr, attested in Old Norse sources as a pile of stones in North Germanic religious practice
- Wetlands and islands in Germanic paganism, religious role of wetlands and depositions in them
