= Broddenbjerg idol =

5th-century BC wood figure found in Denmark

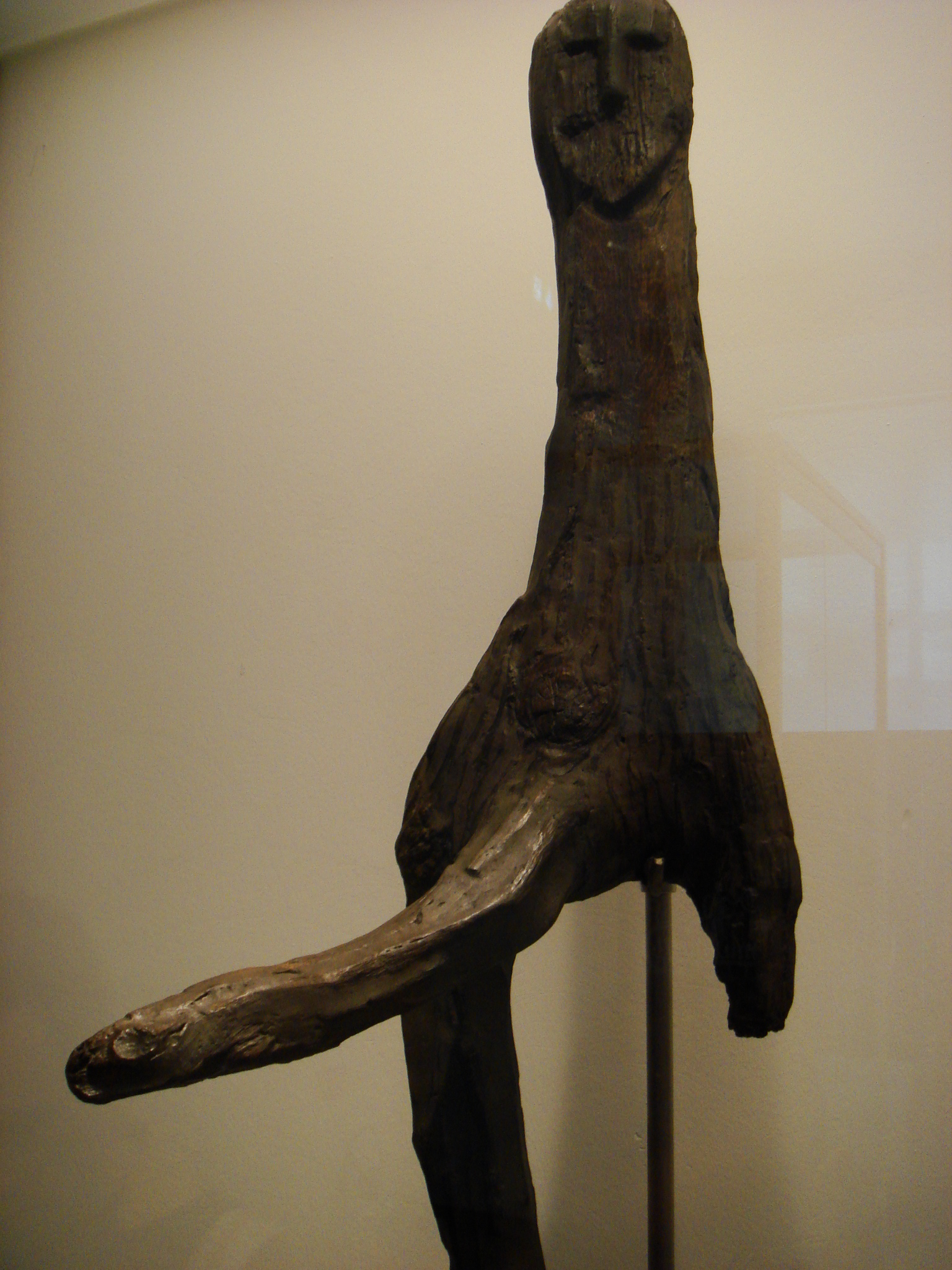

The Broddenbjerg idol is a wooden ithyphallic figure found in a bog at Broddenbjerg, near Viborg, Denmark and now in the National Museum of Denmark in Copenhagen. It is dated to approximately 535–520 BCE.

The figure was discovered in a bog in spring 1880 by someone cutting peat. It is carbon-dated to approximately 535–520 BCE, the later Bronze Age, making it the oldest such figure in Denmark; prior to testing, it had been dated later, to the Roman Iron Age. It is made of an oak branch which was undoubtedly chosen for its shape and is approximately 88 cm (35 in) high, with no arms, two legs formed by the natural branches, and an erect penis approximately 28 cm (11 in) long, the head of which has been marked off by scoring. One leg is broken off; the other is tapered, so that the figure would presumably have been placed upright in the marshy ground. At the top a face has been carved, with a pointed chin which may indicate a beard; this has been seen as an indication that the figure was created by a Celtic culture. The right eye is much more fully indicated than the left, which is only a line; several other such carved figures also have asymmetrical faces. A line beneath the face may indicate a neck-ring or the top of clothing. Resin had been applied to the groin area and the phallus.

It is one of the best known from Denmark of a group of presumed cult images that have been found mainly in wetlands and peat bogs throughout northern and central Europe. An altar-like arrangement with stones for grinding corn and clay vessels which may have contained food for offerings were found beside it.

== See also ==
- Dagenham idol
