= Euffigneix statue =

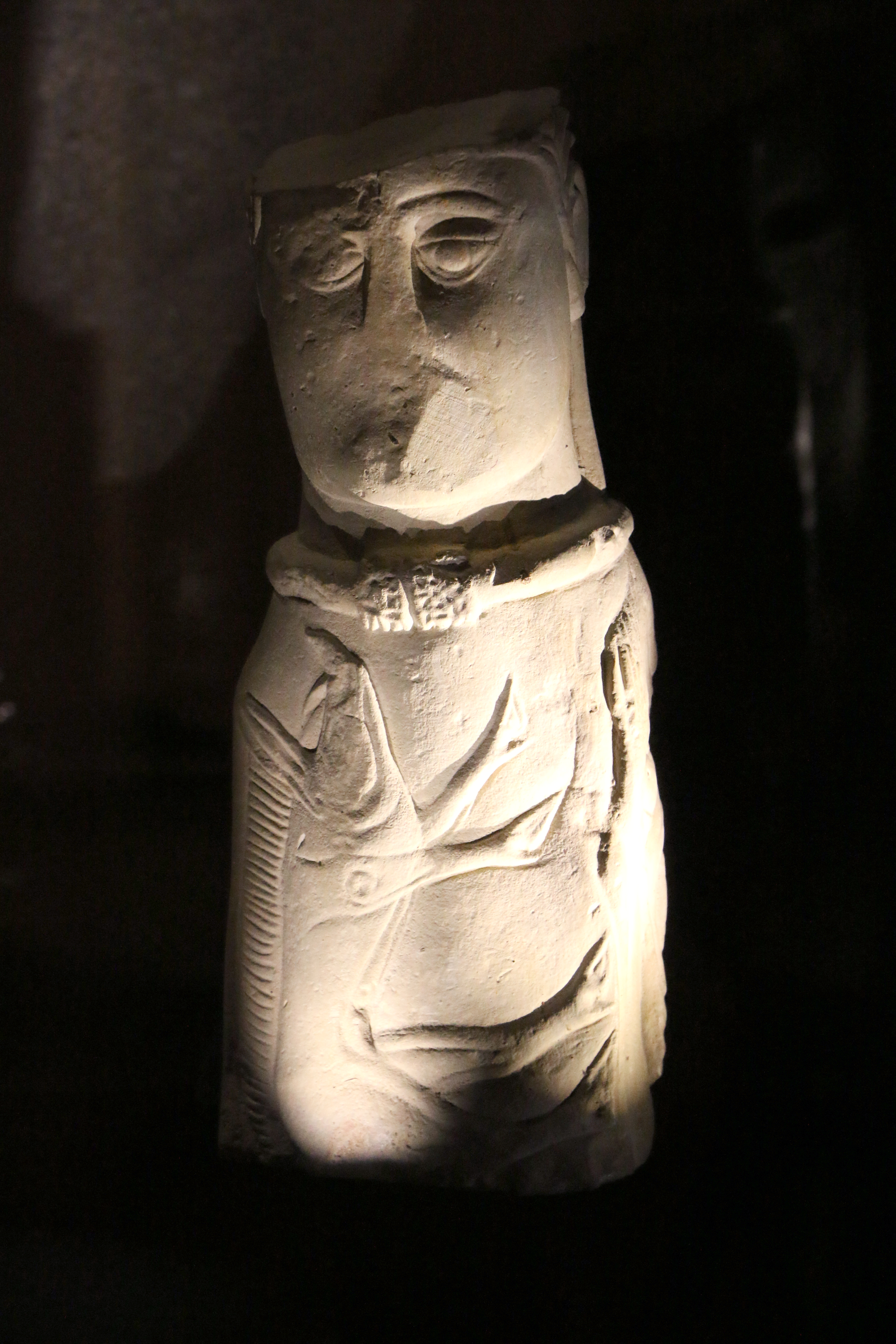
Euffigneix statue

The Euffigneix statue or God of Euffigneix is a Celtic stone pillar statue found near Euffigneix, a commune of Haute-Marne, France. The statue has been dated to the 1st century BC, within the Gallo-Roman period. The statue is a human bust with a large relief of a boar on its chest. The boar was a potent symbol for the Celts and the figure has been thought to represent a Gaulish boar-god, perhaps Moccus.

== Discovery ==
The statue was apparently discovered by chance in 1922 by a farmer, when digging his horse out of some mud near Euffigneix. The statue was in a pit filled with bones. The find spot was not able to be securely located in 1930, when excavations were attempted by Adrien Blanchet. These excavations found nothing.

The statue is now at the Musée des Antiquités Nationales.

== Description ==
The statue is made of limestone. It is cylindrical, somewhat squared around the torso. It measures 26cm tall and 18cm wide. It is broken at the top and bottom. Archaeologist Philip Kiernan has suggested it once bore the characteristic square base of the Iron Age Gallic buste-socles. The reverse of the sculpture below the torc is also badly damaged.

The statue is the bust of a young beardless man. His head, tilted slightly to the right, sits atop an armless torso. A bas-relief of a boar takes up the front of this torso. The boar is sideways, with its face towards the figure's head; it is muscular and bristling, with elongated ears. In place of a left arm, a large stylised eye has been carved onto on his side. Around the figure's neck is a torc with ornate studs. His facial features are badly damaged. The mouth and lower part of the nose have been obliterated. The right eye is damaged. The sculptor has rendered his ears and eyes as heavy-set, but detailed and uncommonly well-proportioned. The top of the figure's head has been sheared off, leaving little of his hair except at the back of his head and in front of his ears. What survives of this hair reveals the care with which it was sculpted. The hair is tied into a palmette-shaped ponytail at the back of his head; long locks on either side reach to the figure's collarbone, tucked behind his ears and into his torc.

== Interpretation ==
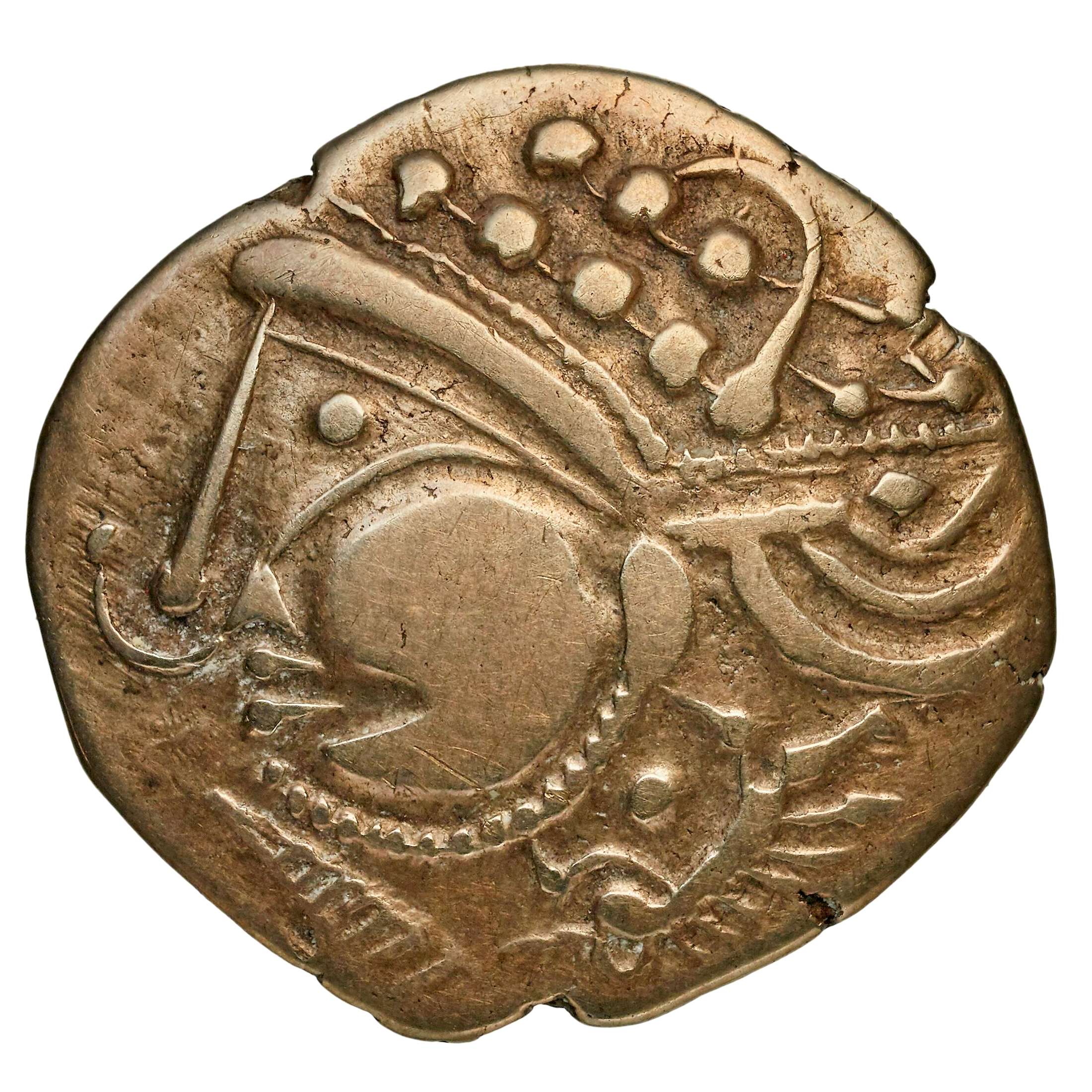
A coin of the Eburovices, depicting a human head with a boar on its neck.

The small size suggests that it was intended for a person or household, rather than larger-scale cult. The form of the statue has been described a trunk-like and its design as owing much to Celtic wood-carving. Paul-Marie Duval has suggested the statue is a copy in stone of an anthropomorphic wooden original. If so, the design is a lucky survival, as few examples of Celtic wood-carving have survived the centuries.

The statue has been dated to early in the Roman occupation of Gaul, around the 1st century BC. Stone sculpture is much more common in this era, and the style of the facial features and boar-relief suggest such a date.

The statue has been thought to represent a god mainly because of the large boar-relief on its chest. In Celtic art, human figures with abstract animal attributes are commonly associated with divinity. Boars were particularly venerated by the Celts. They were depicted in cult imagery with large ears and elaborate bristles. The boar god was called "Moccus" by the Gallic tribe Lingones and "Baco" by the Gauls of the Chalon-sur-Saône region. Indeed, Émile Thévenot has pointed out that Euffigneix lies within the tribal territory of the Lingones, so the statue may be a representation of Moccus. The boar was a symbol of war, of wild nature, and of the hunt; the statue may therefore be of a god of war or a hunter-protector.

However, interpretation is difficult. The statue is an isolated piece. Celtic bronze statuettes of boars sometimes served a religious function, but as household items they were sometimes simply prophylactic. The figure may rather be a representation of a Gaulish hero with a symbol of the hunt.

The boar on this deity's chest has been likened to representations of boars on the coinage of the Ambiani, Veliocasses, and Sequani. A very similar arrangement, in which an upside-down boar appears on the neck of a torc-wearing human, is on a coin of the Eburovices of Évreux.

The eye on the left hand side has been suggested to be apotropaic, warding off the evil eye; a representation of the presumed boar-god's omniscience; or part of another animal figure, whose muzzle is just visible.
