= Wittemoor timber trackway =

Coordinates: 53°7′25.10″N 8°24′14.27″E

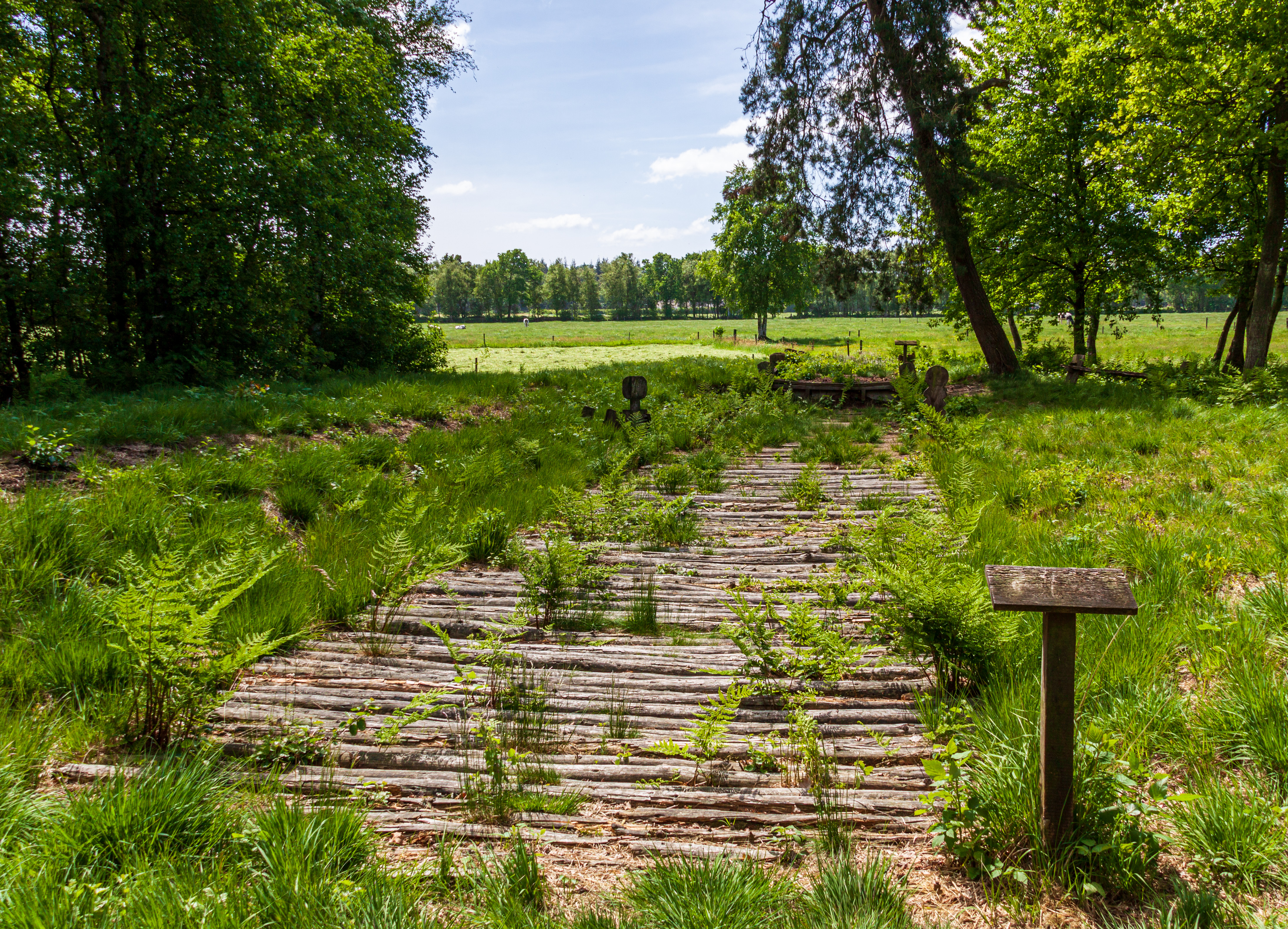
Reconstructed stretch of causeway, with reproductions of cult figurines on either side

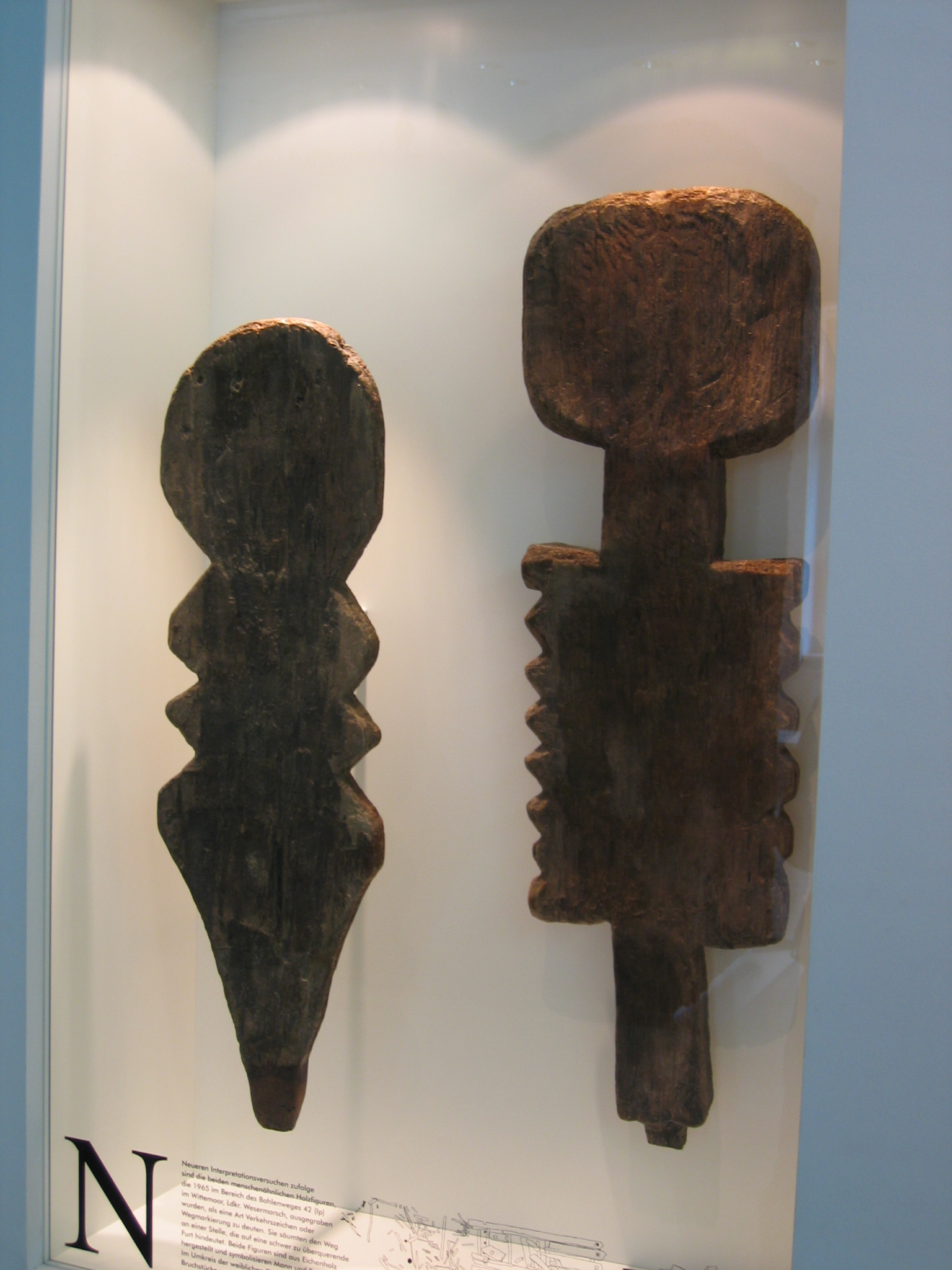
Female (left) and male cult figurines

The Wittemoor timber trackway is a log causeway or corduroy road across a bog at Neuenhuntdorf, part of the Berne in the district of Wesermarsch in Lower Saxony, Germany. Originating in the pre-Roman Iron Age, it is one of several such causeways which have been found in the North German Plain, particularly in the Weser-Ems region. It was excavated in 1965 and 1970 and prehistoric wooden cult figurines were discovered in association with it. It is trackway number XLII (IP).

The trackway runs north–south and has been dated by dendrochronology to 135 BCE. It ran across the Wittemoor bog, connecting the more elevated geest at Hude with the River Hunte. An Iron Age settlement near a spring in the Lintel section of Hude was at the southern end. A section of the trackway has been reconstructed.

Six abstract wooden figurines were found during excavation of the trackway. The first were faceless male and female stelae, among the few Iron Age carvings to be preserved. Carved in silhouette out of oak planks 3 to 7 centimetres (1.2 to 2.8 in) thick, they are highly stylised, the male about 105 centimetres (41 in) tall with a rectangular body, the female about 95 centimetres (37 in) tall with breasts or shoulders indicated by a slanted cut, broad hips and vulva. They stood on either side of the trackway at the point where it crosses a stream, the male figure slotted into a plank, the female on a small mound. Fire sites also on either side of the track, one at each end of the crossing, and stones and worked alder sticks around two simple cult poles immediately north of the female figure suggest that offerings were made there. The figurines had all been laid flat, which it has been suggested was to prevent desecration. There was also a pole archway over the trackway between the two figures and the crossing. The figures are thought to have had an apotropaic (protective) function, although aesthetic decoration has also been suggested as an additional function. The other four poles, one of which was hatchet-shaped, were at damaged locations in the causeway, and may have been either warning markers or cult objects.
