= Ralaghan =

Townland in County Cavan, Ireland

Ralaghan is a townland located outside Shercock, County Cavan in Ireland.

== Ralaghan Man ==
In 1908 a rare, carved anthropomorphic figure, which has been named Ralaghan Man, was uncovered at the bog of Ralaghan.
