= Euffigneix =

- Commune
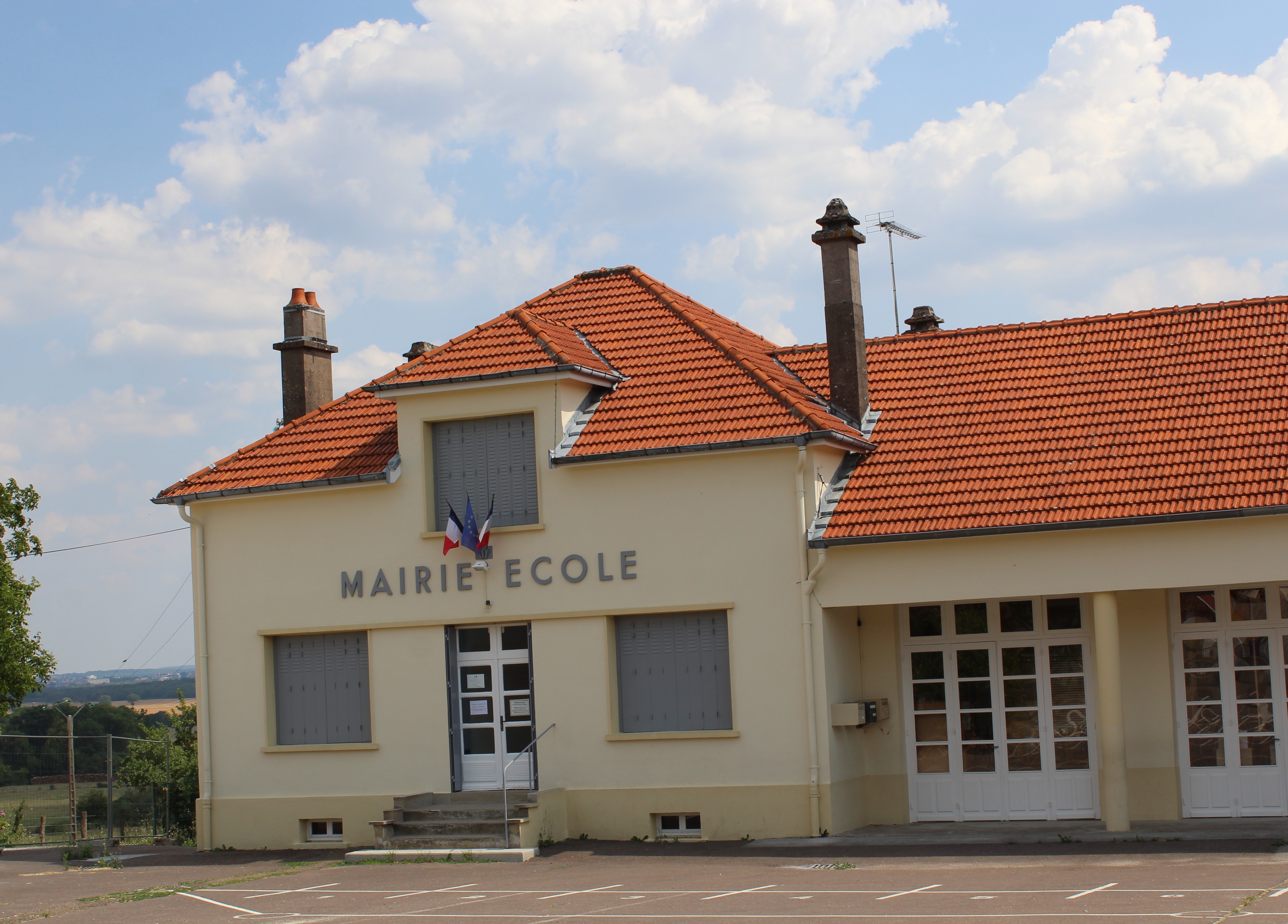
- The town hall in Euffigneix

- Coat of arms
- Location of Euffigneix
- Location within France Location within Grand Est
- Coordinates: 48°07′50″N 5°02′45″E
- Country: France
- Region: Grand Est
- Department: Haute-Marne
- Arrondissement: Chaumont
- Canton: Chaumont-1
- Intercommunality: CA Chaumont

Government
  - Mayor (2020–2026): Frédéric Mutz
- Area^{1}: 9 km^{2} (3.5 sq mi)
- Elevation: 310 m (1,020 ft)
- Population (2023): 299
  - Density: 33/km^{2} (86/sq mi)
- Demonym(s): Euffinois, Euffinoises
- Time zone: UTC+01:00 (CET)
  - Summer (DST): UTC+02:00 (CEST)
- INSEE/Postal code: 52193 /52000
- ^{1} French Land Register data, which excludes lakes, ponds, glaciers > 1 km^{2} (0.386 sq mi or 247 acres) and river estuaries.

Euffigneix (French pronunciation: [øfiɲɛ]) is a commune in the Haute-Marne department in north-eastern France. The Euffigneix statue was found here.

== See also ==
- Communes of the Haute-Marne department
