= Roos Carr figures =

Prehistoric wooden figures, Yorkshire, England

The Roos Carr figures are a group of prehistoric wooden figurines found at Roos Carr, near Withernsea in the East Riding of Yorkshire, England, in 1836.

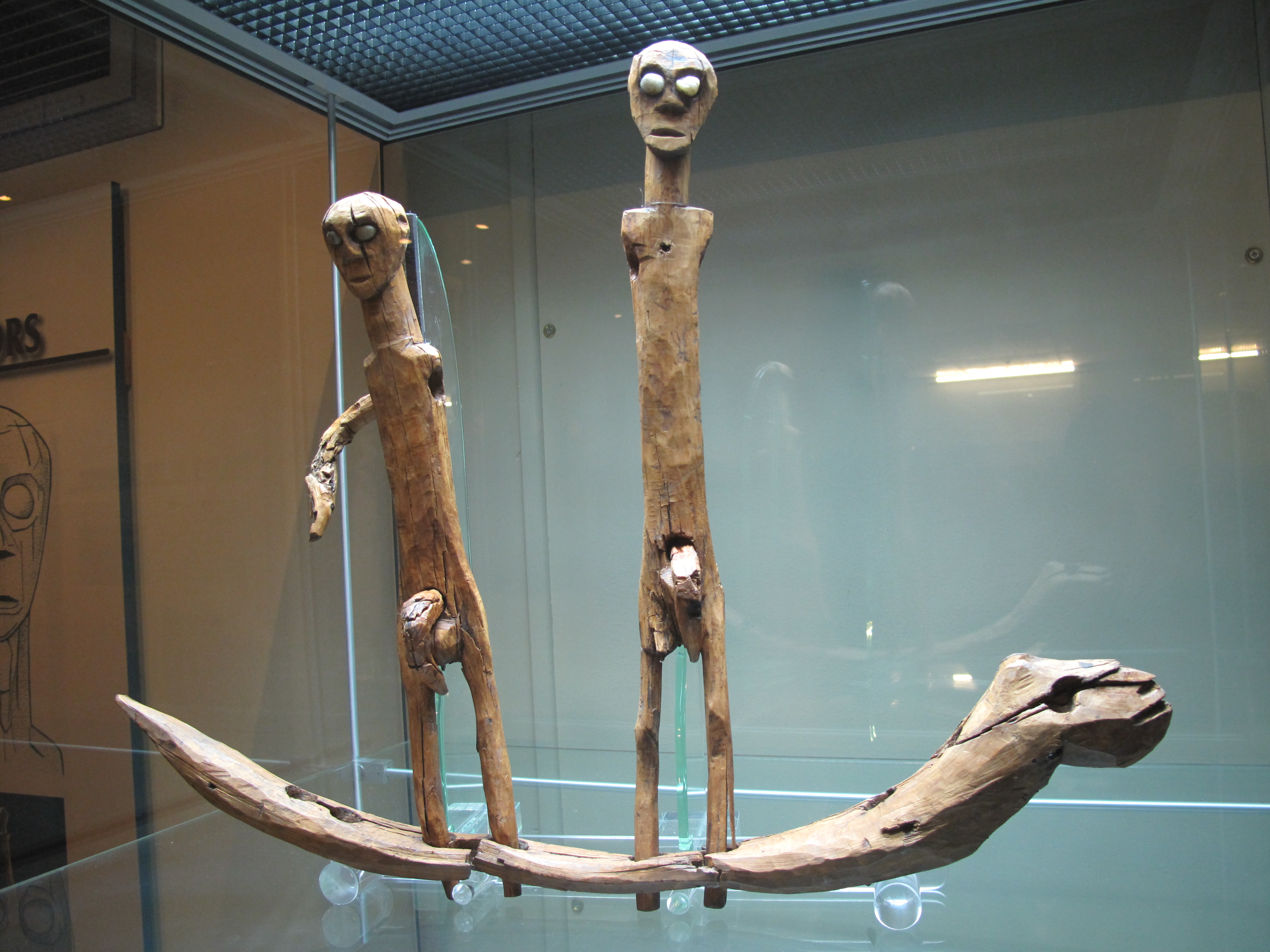
Museum display of Roos Carr figures

== Discovery ==
The figures were found in 1836 by labourers digging a ditch at Roos Carr. The figures were found at a depth of approximately 2 m alongside other wooden objects including a box, a boat with a serpent-head prow, and other degraded objects.

Four of the figures and the boat were donated to the Hull Literary and Philosophical Society and are now in the collection of Hull and East Riding Museum. The museum acquired a fifth figurine from the collection in 1902.

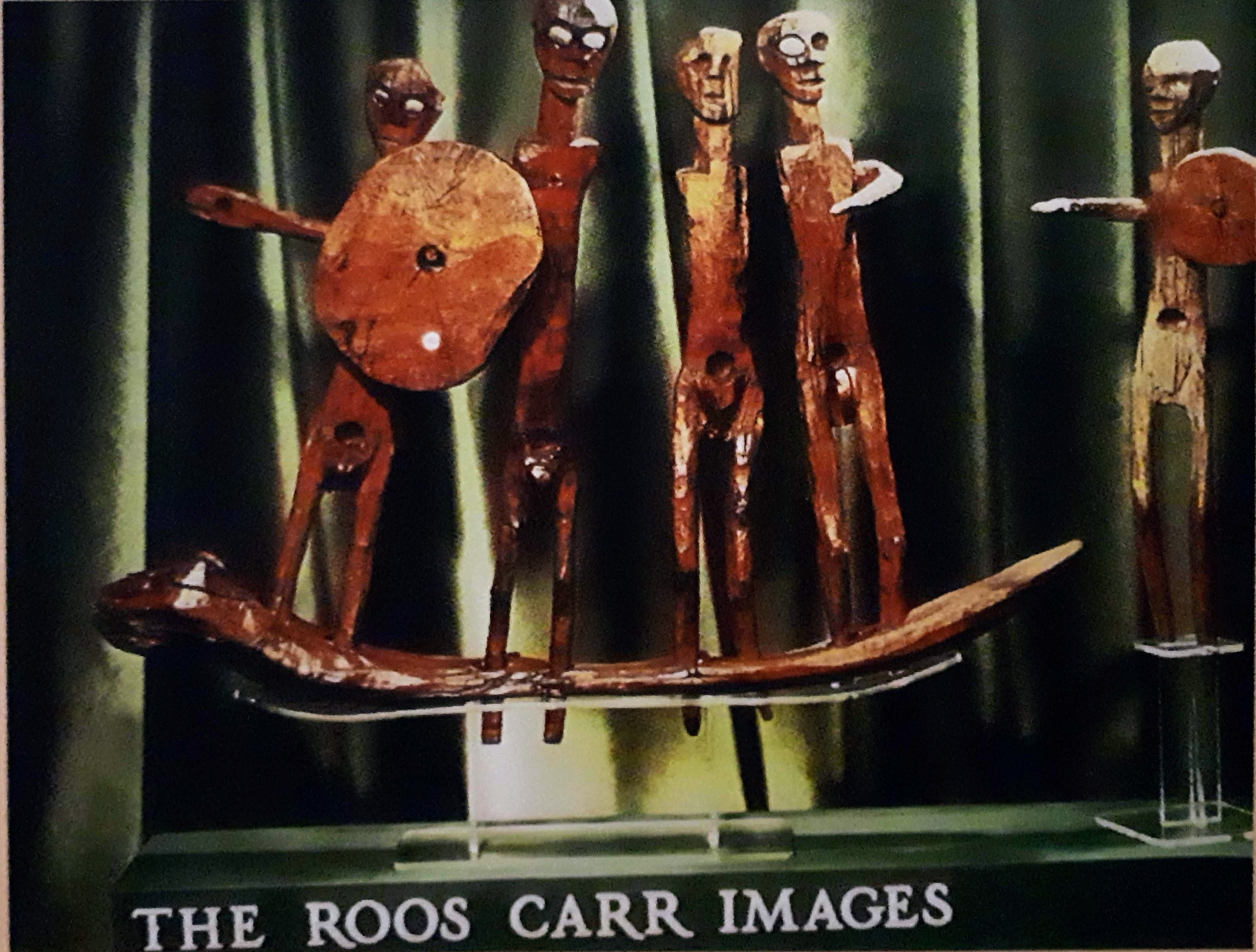

== Description and interpretation ==
The figures are likely to be votive offerings. They are all carved from yew wood into humanoid shapes with carved facial features and quartzite eyes. Male and female figures are depicted with what appears to be a removable penis present in the collection. Each boat has space for four figurines and so the original deposit probably contained at least two 'crews'. In 1841 Poulson recorded eight figures known from the site and research suggests that three figures may be from one crew and two from another.

The figures have been radiocarbon dated to 770–409 BC as reported by Dent in 2010 and to 606–509 BC by Coles in 1990. Both dates places the figures in the early Iron Age in date. Similarly dated wooden figures are known from at least six other sites in Britain and Ireland.

== Public display ==
The figures have been on display in Hull and East Riding Museum and its antecedents. From February to July 2022 they were included as part of 'The World of Stonehenge' exhibition at the British Museum.

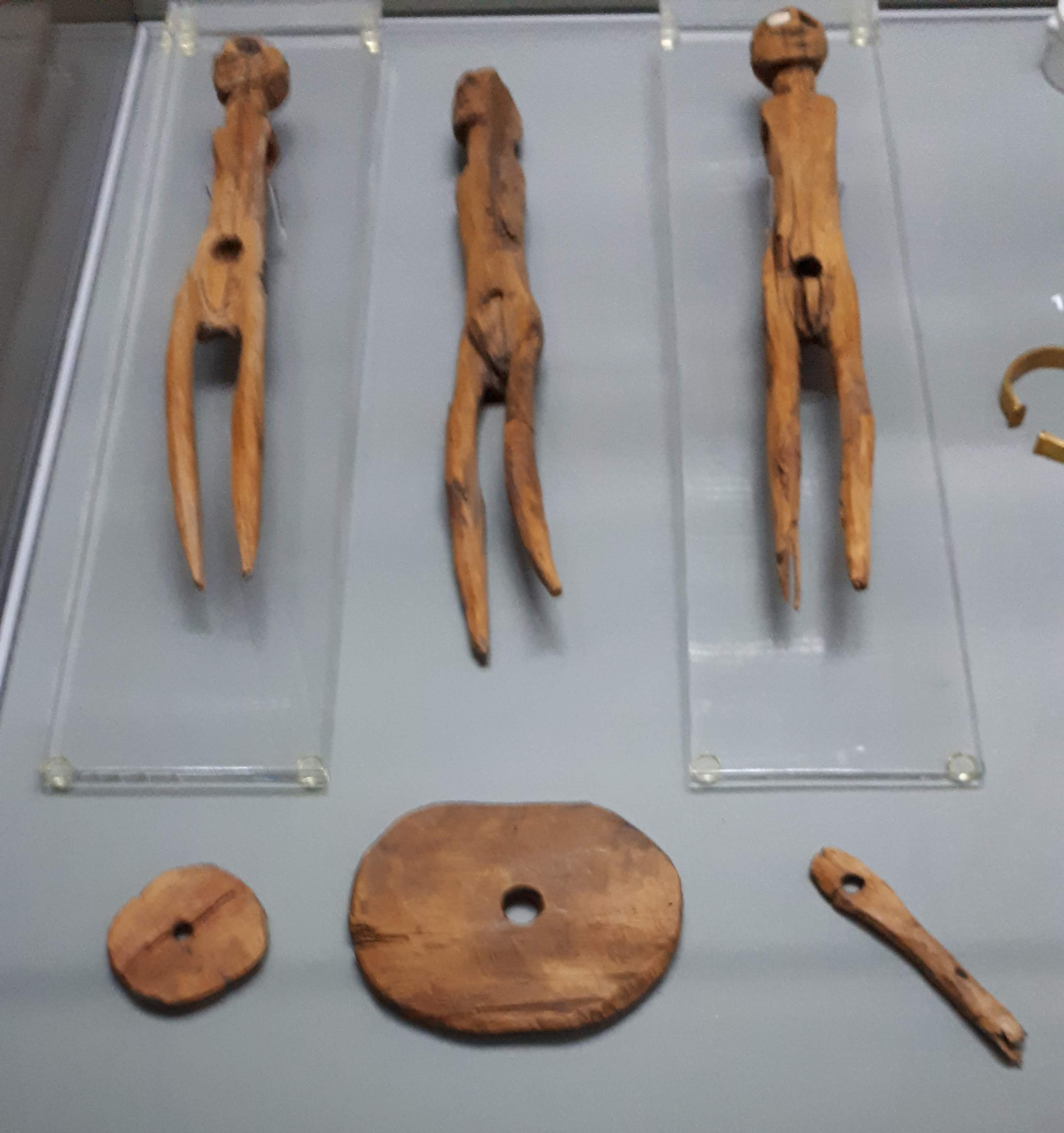
Roos Carr figures
