= Donar's Oak =

Sacred tree of the Germanic pagans

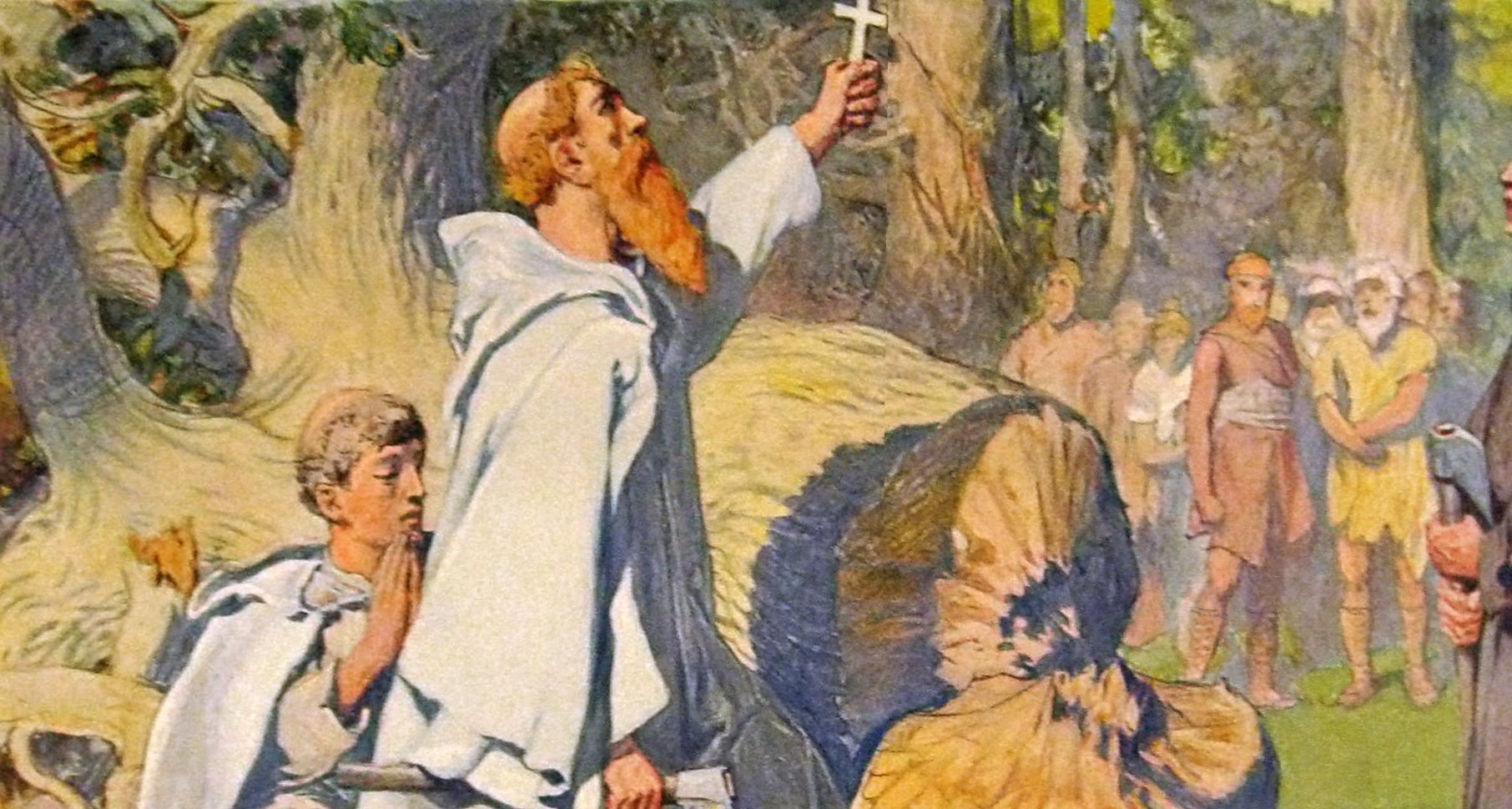
Bonifacius (1905) by Emil Doepler

Donar's Oak (also Thor's Oak or, via interpretatio romana, Jove's Oak) was a sacred tree of the Germanic pagans located in an unclear location around what is now Hesse, Germany. According to the 8th-century Vita Bonifatii auctore Willibaldo, Saint Boniface, an Anglo-Saxon missionary, and his retinue cut down the tree earlier in the same century. Wood from the oak was then reportedly used to build a church at the site dedicated to Saint Peter. Sacred trees and sacred groves were widely venerated by the Germanic peoples.

== Willibald's Life of Saint Boniface ==
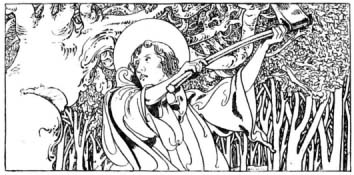
A depiction of Saint Boniface destroying Thor's oak from The Little Lives of the Saints (1904), illustrated by Charles Robinson

According to Willibald's 8th-century Life of Saint Boniface, the falling of the tree occurred during Boniface's life earlier the same century at a location at the time known as Gaesmere (for details, see discussion below).

Although no date is provided, the felling may have occurred around 723 or 724. Willibald's account is as follows (note that Robinson has translated robor Iobis, "tree of Jove", as "oak of Jupiter"):

Cum vero Hessorum iam multi, catholica fide subditi ac septiformis spiritus gratia confirmati, manus inspositionem acciperunt, et quidem, nondum animo confortati, intermeratae fidei documenta integre perceipere rennuerunt, alii etiam lignis et fontibus clanculo, alii autem aperte sacrificabant; alii vero aruspicia et divinationes, prestigia atque icantationes occulte, alii quidem manifeste exercebant; alii quippe auguria et auspicia intendebant diversosque sacrificandi ritus incoluerunt; alii etiam, quibus mens sanior inerat, omni abeicta gentilitatis profantione, nihil horum commisserunt. Quorum consultu atque consilio roborem quendam mirae magnitudinis, qui prisco paganorum vocabulo appellatur robor Iobis, in loco qui dicitur Gaesmere, servis Dei secum adstantibus succidere temptavit. Cumque, mentis constantia confortatus, arborem succidisset, — magna quippe aderat copia paganorum, qui et inimicum deorum suorum intra se diligentissime devotabant, — sed ad modicum quidem arbore praeciso, confestim inmensa roboris moles, divino desuper flatu exagitata, palmitum confracto culmine, corruit et quasi superni nutus solatio in quattuor etiam partes disrupta est, et quattuor ingentis magnitudinis aequali longitudine trunci absque fratrum labore adstantium apparuerunt. Quo viso, prius devotantes pagani etiam versa vice benedictionem Domino, pristina abiecta maledictione, credentes reddiderunt. Tunc autem summae sanctitatis antistes, consilio inito cum fratribus, ligneum ex supradictae arboris metallo oratorium construxit eamque in honore sancti Petri apostoli dedicavit.

Now at that time many of the Hessians, brought under the Catholic faith and confirmed by the grace of the sevenfold spirit, received the laying on of hands; others indeed, not yet strengthened in soul, refused to accept in their entirety the lessons of the inviolate faith. Moreover some were wont secretly, some openly to sacrifice to trees and springs; some in secret, others openly practiced inspections of victims and divinations, legerdemain and incantations; some turned their attention to auguries and auspices and various sacrificial rites; while others, with sounder minds, abandoned all the profanations of heathenism, and committed none of these things. With the advice and counsel of these last, the saint attempted, in the place called Gaesmere, while the servants of God stood by his side, to fell a certain oak of extraordinary size, which is called, by an old name of the pagans, the Oak of Jupiter. And when in the strength of his steadfast heart he had cut the lower notch, there was present a great multitude of pagans, who in their souls were earnestly cursing the enemy of their gods. But when the fore side of the tree was notched only a little, suddenly the oak's vast bulk, driven by a blast from above, crashed to the ground, shivering its crown of branches as it fell; and, as if by the gracious compensation of the Most High, it was also burst into four parts, and four trunks of huge size, equal in length, were seen, unwrought by the brethren who stood by. At this sight the pagans who before had cursed now, on the contrary, believed, and blessed the Lord, and put away their former reviling. Then moreover the most holy bishop, after taking counsel with the brethren, built from the timber of the tree a wooden oratory, and dedicated it in honor of Saint Peter the apostle.

== Germanic tree and grove veneration ==
Sacred groves and sacred trees were venerated throughout the history of the Germanic peoples and were targeted for destruction by Christian missionaries during the Christianization of the Germanic peoples. Ken Dowden notes that behind this great oak dedicated to Donar, the Irminsul (also felled by Christian missionaries in the 8th century), and the Sacred tree at Uppsala (described by Adam of Bremen in the 11th century), stands a mythic prototype of an immense world tree, described in Norse mythology as Yggdrasil.

== Location of Gaesmere ==
By the nineteenth century Gaesmere was identified as Geismar in the Schwalm-Eder district, for instance by August Neander. There are a few dissenting voices: in his 1916 translation of Willibald's Vita Bonifacii, George W. Robinson says "The location [of the tree] is uncertain. There are in Hesse several places named Geismar." The historian Thomas F. X. Noble (2000) describes the location of the tree felling as "still unidentified". In the late 19th century the folklorist and philologist Francis Barton Gummere identified the Gaesemere of the attestation as Geismar, a district of Frankenberg located in Hesse.

However, most scholars agree that the site mentioned by Willibald is Geismar near Fritzlar. In 1897 the historian C. Neuber placed the Donar Oak "im Kreise Fritzlar". While Gregor Richter in 1906 noted that one scholar considered Hofgeismar as a possible location, he himself comments that most people consider Geismar near Fritzlar as the right place. Unequivocal identification of Geismar near Fritzlar as the location of the Donar Oak is found in the Catholic Encyclopedia, in teaching materials for religious studies classes in Germany, in the work of Alexander Demandt, in histories of the Carolingians, and in the work of Lutz von Padberg. The Reallexikon der Germanischen Altertumskunde notes that for Willibald it was probably not necessary to specify the location any further because he presumed it widely known. This Geismar was close to Büraburg, then a hill castle and a Frankish stronghold.

== Role in Bonifatian hagiography and imagery ==
One of the focal points of Boniface's life, the scene is frequently repeated, illustrated, and reimagined. Roberto Muller, for instance, in a retelling of Boniface's biography for young adults, has the four parts of the tree fall down to the ground and form a cross. In Hubertus Lutterbach's fictional expansion of the Boniface correspondence, Boniface relates the entire event in a long letter to Pope Gregory II, commenting that it took hours to cut the tree down, and that any account that says the tree fell down miraculously is a falsification of history.

== See also ==
- List of individual trees
- Capitulatio de partibus Saxoniae, a law code imposed by Charlemagne in 785 that prescribes death for Saxon pagans refusing to convert to Christianity
- Massacre of Verden, a massacre of 4,500 captive pagan Saxons ordered by Charlemagne in 782
- Caill Tomair, a grove dedicated to Thor destroyed by the forces of Brian Boru in early 1000
