= Sacred trees and groves in Germanic paganism and mythology =

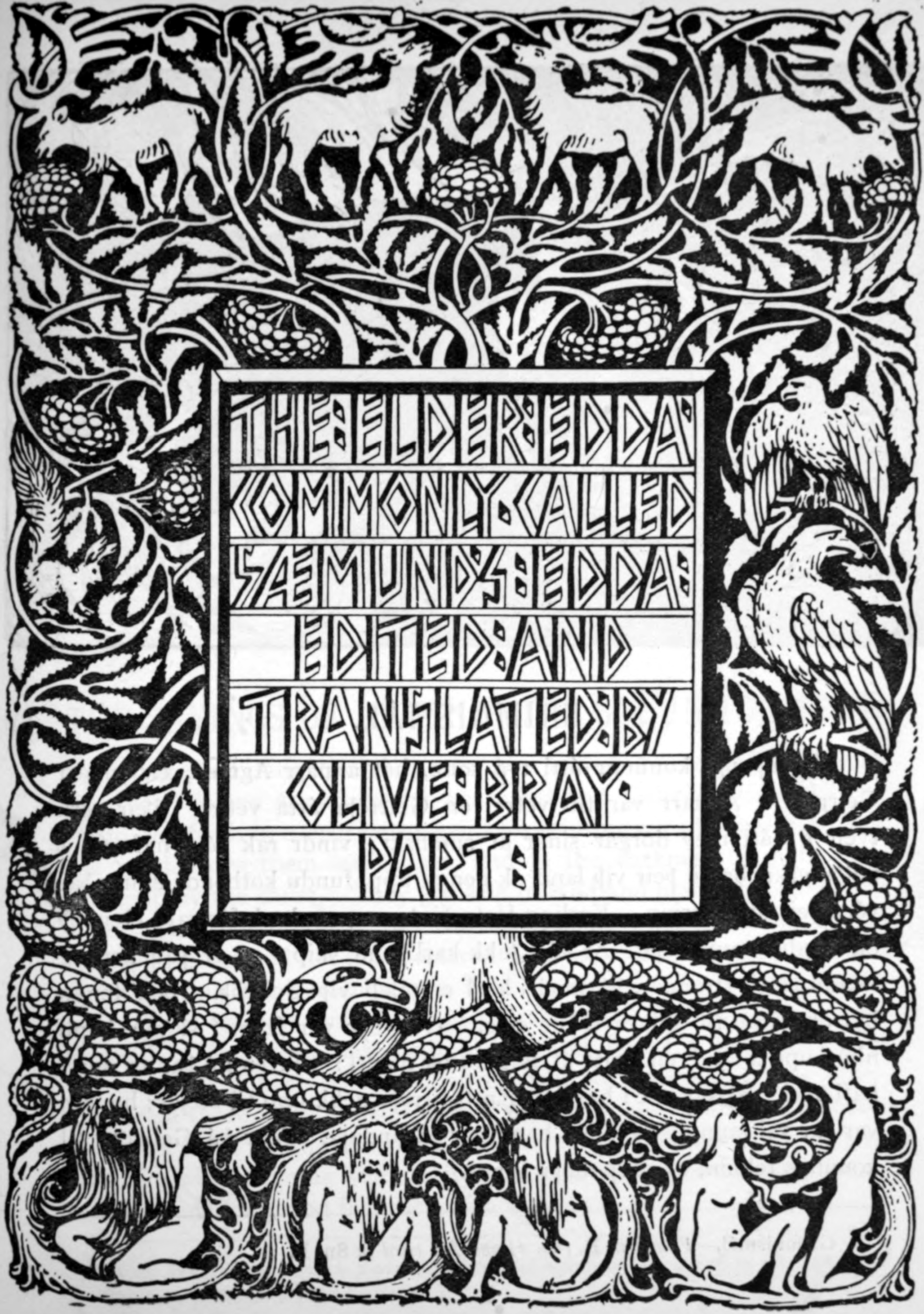
A stylized depiction of the cosmological tree Yggdrasil by W. G. Collingwood in Olive Bray's English translation of the Poetic Edda

Trees hold a particular role in Germanic paganism and Germanic mythology, both as individuals (sacred trees) and in groups (sacred groves). The central role of trees in Germanic religion is noted in the earliest written reports about the Germanic peoples, with the Roman historian Tacitus stating that Germanic cult practices took place exclusively in groves rather than temples. Scholars consider that reverence for and rites performed at individual trees are derived from the mythological role of the world tree, Yggdrasil; onomastic and some historical evidence also connects individual deities to both groves and individual trees. After Christianisation, trees continue to play a significant role in the folk beliefs of the Germanic peoples.

== Terminology ==
The pagan Germanic peoples referred to holy places by a variety of terms and many of these terms variously referred to stones, groves, and temple structures. From Proto-Germanic *harugaz, a masculine noun, developed Old Norse hǫrgr meaning 'altar', Old English hearg 'altar', and Old High German harug meaning 'holy grove, holy stone'. According to philologist Vladimir Orel, the term was borrowed from the continental Celtic *karrikā or, alternately, the same non-Indo-European source as the Celtic source. A more general term for a sacred place was *wīhą reflected in Old Norse vé.

The Proto-Germanic masculine noun *nemedaz, which developed into Old Frankish nimid ('holy grove'), similarly either developed from, or is otherwise connected to, Gaulish nemeton, Latin sacellum and Old Irish nemed 'holiness'.

Another Proto-Germanic masculine noun *lauhaz, has given rise to words with a variety of meanings in various Germanic languages, including Anglo-Saxon lēah, 'meadow', Middle Low German lo, 'bush', and Old High German laoh, löh, 'grove, copse, bush'; it is cognate with Latin lūcus, 'sacred grove'.

Scandinavian placenames occur with the name of a deity compounded with lundr, 'grove', or viðr, 'wood'.

== Attestations and archaeological record ==
Sacred trees and groves are widely attested among the records of the ancient Germanic peoples. Some scholars hypothesize that they even predated the development of temples (according to Rudolf Simek, "there were sacred woods long before there were temples and altars").

In his Germania, Tacitus says that the Germanic peoples "consecrate woods and groves and they apply the name of gods to that mysterious presence which they see only with the eye of devotion", Tacitus describes the grove of the Semnones and refers to a castum nemus ('chaste grove') in which the image of the goddess Nerthus was hallowed, and other reports from the Roman period also refer to rites held by continental Germanic peoples in groves, including the sacrifices in forest clearings of survivors by the Cherusci after their victory at the Battle of the Teutoburg Forest, recounted by Tacitus in his Annals based on a report by Germanicus. Such groves were sometimes dedicated to a particular deity: in addition to the case of Nerthus, there was a silva Herculi sacra ('wood sacred to Hercules', an interpretatio romana) near the River Weser, and the Semnones reportedly held their rituals in honor of the regnator omnium deus ('god the ruler of all'). The scholar of Germanic religion Jan de Vries noted that placenames such as Frølund (Denmark), and Ullunda, Frösvi, and Mjärdevi (Sweden), in which the name of a deity is compounded with words meaning "grove" or "wood", suggest a continuation of the same practice, but are found almost exclusively in eastern Scandinavia; however, there is a Caill Tomair recorded near Dublin, an oak forest apparently sacred to Thor.

Reverence for individual trees among the Germanic peoples is a common theme in medieval Christian denunciations of backsliding into paganism. In some cases, such as Donar's Oak (according to legend, felled by Christian missionary Saint Boniface), these were associated with particular gods, and the association of individual trees with saints can be seen as a continuation of the tradition into modern times.

The Landnámabók, which describes the settlement of Iceland and dates from the 13th century, tells of a skáld by the name of Þórir snepill Ketilsson who, after his crew encountered and fended off raiding vikings, arrived in Iceland and founded a sacred grove there:

...Thorir took possession of all of the whole of Fnjoskadale, as far as Odeila. He made his home at Lund [Old Norse 'grove'], and held the grove sacred.

Sacred trees and groves leave few archaeological traces, but two such sites may have been identified, both in Sweden. A mouldering birch stump surrounded by animal bones, especially from brown bear and pig, was discovered under the church on Frösön in Jämtland in 1984. The finds have been carbon dated to the late Viking Age. Possible burnt offerings have been found on a hill at Lunda near Strängnäs in Södermanland; the archeologist Gunnar Andersson has argued that the combination of the finds and the placename—which can mean "the grove"—point to this being the remnants of a sacrificial grove. Scholars have proposed that publicly revered trees such as that at the temple in Uppsala were regarded as counterparts to the mythic world tree Yggdrasil.

== Notable examples ==
The present section divides particularly notable examples into texts discussing the religious activities of the ancient Germanic peoples involving trees and groves (Germanic paganism) and their appearance in the myths of the Germanic peoples, particularly the North Germanic peoples (Germanic mythology).

=== Germanic paganism ===
Sacred trees and groves are mentioned throughout the history of the ancient Germanic people, from their earliest attestations among Roman scribes to references made by medieval Christian monks. Notable examples of sacred trees and groves in the historical record among the ancient Germanic peoples include the following:

Name	Location	Description	Attestations
Grove of Baduhenna	Ancient Frisia	According to Roman senator Tacitus in his first century CE work Annals, the Frisians dismembered 900 Roman soldiers in a grove dedicated to the goddess in 28 CE.	Annals
Grove of Nerthus	On an "island in the ocean", often identified as Zealand, Denmark	In his first century CE ethnography of the Germanic peoples, Roman senator Tacitus describes a sacred grove dedicated to the goddess Nerthus	Germania
Grove of the Semnones	Possibly northern Germany	According to Tacitus, the Semnones, a populous and powerful Germanic people, allowed none to enter the grove without being fettered and blindfolded. If the blindfolded falls, they must crawl out of the grove. There they venerated what Tacitus refers to as "regnator omnium deus" and regularly gather to execute a human sacrifice. (See grove of fetters.)	Germania
Donar's Oak	Near Hesse, Germany	Donar's Oak was a sacred tree located in an unclear location around what is now the region of Hesse, Germany. According to the 8th century Vita Bonifatii auctore Willibaldi, the Anglo-Saxon missionary Saint Boniface and his retinue cut down the tree earlier the same century. Wood from the oak was then reportedly used to build a church at the site dedicated to Saint Peter.	Vita Bonifatii auctore Willibaldi
Irminsul	Near Obermarsberg, Germany	Sacred pillar-like objects, perhaps tree stumps, held sacred by the pagan Saxons	Royal Frankish Annals, De miraculis sancti Alexandri, Kaiserchronik
Sacred tree at Uppsala	Gamla Uppsala, Sweden	According to Adam of Bremen, a huge evergreen tree stood by the Temple of Uppsala. According to Hervarar saga, it was smeared with blood after a horse sacrifice was performed.	Gesta Hammaburgensis ecclesiae pontificum, Hervarar saga
Caill Tomair	Near Hiberno-Norse Dublin	Destroyed by Irish forces led by Brian Boru in early 1000 CE after the Battle of Glenmama (Old Irish 'Thor's Grove').	Annals of Inisfallen

=== Germanic mythology ===
In Norse mythology, the northernmost extension of Germanic mythology, several sacred trees are mentioned. The most prominent of these trees is the holy tree central to the cosmos, Yggdrasil. Prominent trees mentioned in Germanic mythology include the following:

Name	Location	Description	Attestations
Barnstokkr	The center of King Völsung's hall	Völsung's hall is built around the tree, it bears "fair blossoms", and stretches through the roof of the structure. The tree is flanked on both sides by large hearths.	Völsunga saga
Glasir	In front of the doors of Valhalla (unattributed verse, Prose Edda)	A particularly beautiful tree with red-gold foliage	Poetic Edda, Prose Edda
Hoddmímis holt	Unstated	Generally considered to be another name for Yggdrasil. Future refuge of Líf and Lífþrasir during the cataclysmic events of Ragnarök	Poetic Edda, Prose Edda
Læraðr	On top of Valhalla	Generally considered another name for Yggdrasil. Grazed upon by the hart Eikþyrnir and the goat Heiðrún	Poetic Edda, Prose Edda
Mímameiðr	See description	Generally considered to be another name for Yggdrasil. Cannot be hurt by fire or iron, bears fruit beneficial for pregnant women, the cock Víðópnir roosts on top of it	Fjölsvinnsmál
Yggdrasil	Cosmological, central to all things	An immense ash tree, central to the cosmos and considered sacred. Its branches and roots extend far into the nine worlds, and at its three roots are three wells: Urðarbrunnr, where the gods assemble daily in a thing and the three norns tend the tree, Hvergelmir, and Mímisbrunnr. Creatures live within Yggdrasil, including the dragon Níðhöggr, the squirrel Ratatoskr, an unnamed eagle, and the stags Dáinn, Dvalinn, Duneyrr and Duraþrór.	Poetic Edda, Prose Edda

== Post-Christianisation ==
After the nominal Christianisation of Anglo-Saxons and Saxons in the 7th and 8th centuries, many heathen practices centered on trees such as worship and giving of gifts were made punishable crimes. Despite this, 11th century accounts describe the continuation of votive offering deposition at trees in England and worship in groves in Saxony. English Penitential laws made in the 11th century explicitly forbid the use of a friðplott or friðgeard—a peaceful area around stones, trees or springs.

In later folklore, offerings are made to tree spirits such as Askafroa in Scandinavia and Germany, and the Women of One Tree Hill in England. In the latter case, gifts to the trees are explicitly linked with a returned gift of increased land fertility. There exists also a Scandinavian folk tradition of farmers making small offerings to a "warden tree", regarded as exercising a protective function over the family and land.

There was a tradition in Setesdal and Telemark to give small offerings of food or alcohol to some trees, where wights were believed to live. Some examples from Setesdal mentioned by Johannes Skar are a sacred rowan in Straumsland and the Lande Oak in Bygland, among other. In Telemark, according to Rikard Berge, there was before 1840-s a sacred pine in Smørklepp called "Gravsfura", which stood on a small hill, probably a burial mound. Berge also mentions a sacred oak in Jønneberg, in Bø. In addition to single trees, there is known at least one sacred grove: Berge mentions a sacred birch grove called "Huddebjørkane" ("the hulder birches"), which once stood close to the church in Vinje.

== See also ==
- Anthropomorphic wooden cult figurines of Central and Northern Europe, wooden cult images created by the Germanic peoples
- Ask and Embla, the first human beings in Norse mythology, created from trees and whose names may mean "ash" and "elm"
- Dream of the Rood, an Old English poem describing the crucifixion of Jesus from the point of view of a sentient tree
- Hlín, a Norse goddess whose name some scholars have suggested may mean 'maple tree'
- Ilmr, an Old Norse goddess whose name may mean 'elm'

== Sources ==
- Andersson, Gunnar. 2006. "Among trees, bones, and stones: The sacred grove at Lunda" in Andrén, Anders, Kristina Jennbert, and Catharina Raudvere. Old Norse Religion in Long-Term Perspectives: Origins, Changes, and Interactions. Nordic Academic Press. ISBN 978-91-89116-81-8
- Birley, A. R. 1999. Trans. Tacitus, Germania. Oxford University Press. ISBN 978-0-19-283300-6
- Berge, Rikard (1922). Flotubud-guden og andre nyleg funne gudebilæte.
- Berge, Rikard (1940). Vinje og Rauland, vol. 1.
- Hacken, Richard. 2022. Worship of the German Forest: An Historical Overview. Academia Letters.
- Hermann Pálsson. 2006 [1972]. Landnámabók: The Book of Settlements. University of Manitoba Press. ISBN 9780887553707
- Magnell, Ola; Iregren, Elisabeth. 2010. "Veitstu Hvé Blóta Skal : The Old Norse Blót in the Light of Osteological Remains from Frösö Church, Jämtland, Sweden". Current Swedish Archaeology. 18. Nordic Academic Press. ISSN 1102-7355
- Orel, Vladimir. 2003. A Handbook of Germanic Etymology. Brill. ISBN 9004128751
- Ringe, Don (2006). From Proto-Indo-European to Proto-Germanic. A Linguistic History of English. Vol. 1 (1st ed.). New York City: Oxford University Press. ISBN 978-0-19-928413-9. OCLC 64554645. OL 7405151M. Wikidata Q131605459.
- Simek, Rudolf. 2007. Translated by Angela Hall. Dictionary of Northern Mythology. D.S. Brewer. ISBN 0-85991-513-1
- Skar, Johannes (1903). Gamalt or Sætesdal, vol. 1.
- Vinje, Arne (1996). Kult og kyrkje.
- De Vries, Jan. 1970. Altgermanische Religionsgeschichte. Vol. 1. Grundriss der germanischen Philologie 12/I. 3rd ed (repr. 2nd ed [1956]). De Gruyter. OCLC 634541207. (in German)
