= Barnstokkr =

Mythological tree

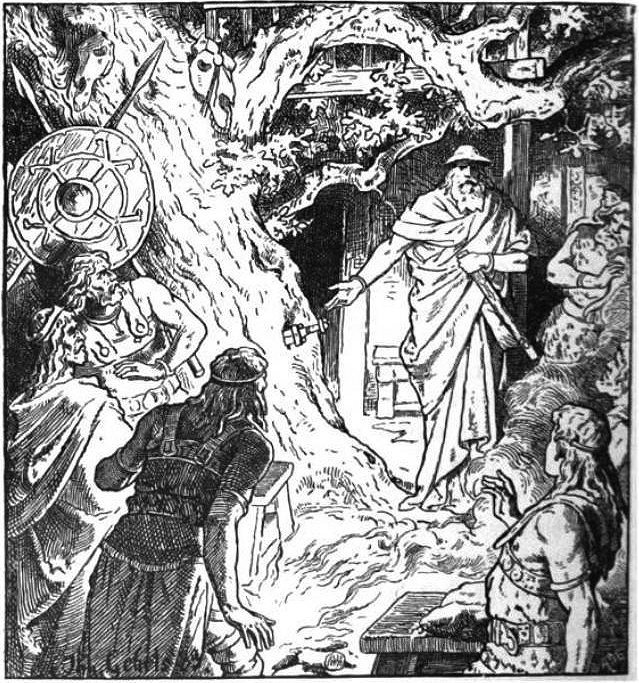
"Sigmund's Sword" (1889) by Johannes Gehrts.

In Norse mythology, Barnstokkr (Old Norse, literally "child-trunk") is a tree that stands in the center of King Völsung's hall. Barnstokkr is attested in chapters 2 and 3 of the Völsunga saga, written in the 13th century from earlier tradition, partially based on events from the 5th century and the 6th century, where, during a banquet, a one-eyed, very tall man appears and thrusts a sword into the tree which only Sigmund is able to pull free. Scholarly theories have been put forth about the implications of Barnstokkr and its relation to other trees in Germanic paganism.

== Völsunga saga ==
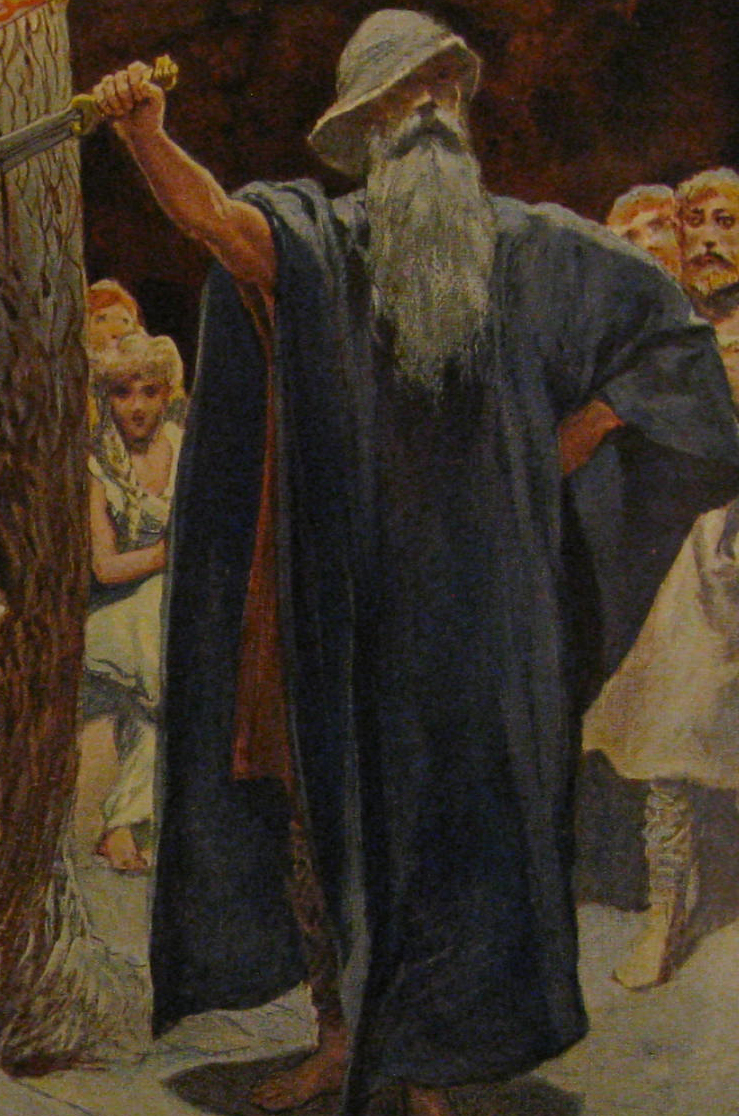
"Odin in the Hall of the Völsungs" (1905) by Emil Doepler.

Barnstokkr is introduced in chapter 2 of Völsunga saga where King Völsung is described as having "had an excellent palace built in this fashion: a huge tree stood with its trunk in the hall and its branches, with fair blossoms, stretched out through the roof. They called the tree Barnstokk[r]".

In chapter 3, King Völsung is holding a marriage feast for his daughter Signy and King Siggeir at King Völsung's hall. At the hall, large fires are kindled in long hearths running the length of the hall, while in the middle of the hall stands the great tree Barnstokkr. That evening, while those attending the feast are sitting by the flaming hearths, they are visited by a one-eyed, very tall man whom they do not recognize. The stranger is wearing a hooded, mottled cape, linen breeches tied around his legs, and is barefooted. Sword in hand, the man walks towards Barnstokkr and his hood hangs low over his head, gray with age. The man brandishes the sword and thrusts it into the trunk of the tree, and the blade sinks to its hilt. Words of welcome fail the crowd.

The tall stranger says that he who draws the sword from the trunk shall receive it as a gift, and he who is able to pull free the sword shall never carry a better sword than it. The old man leaves the hall, and nobody knows who he was, or where he went. Everyone stands, trying their hand at pulling free the sword from the trunk of Barnstokkr. The noblest attempt to pull free the sword first, followed by those ranked after them. Sigmund, son of King Völsung, takes his turn, and—as if the sword had lain loose for him—he draws it from the trunk. The saga then continues.

== Theories ==
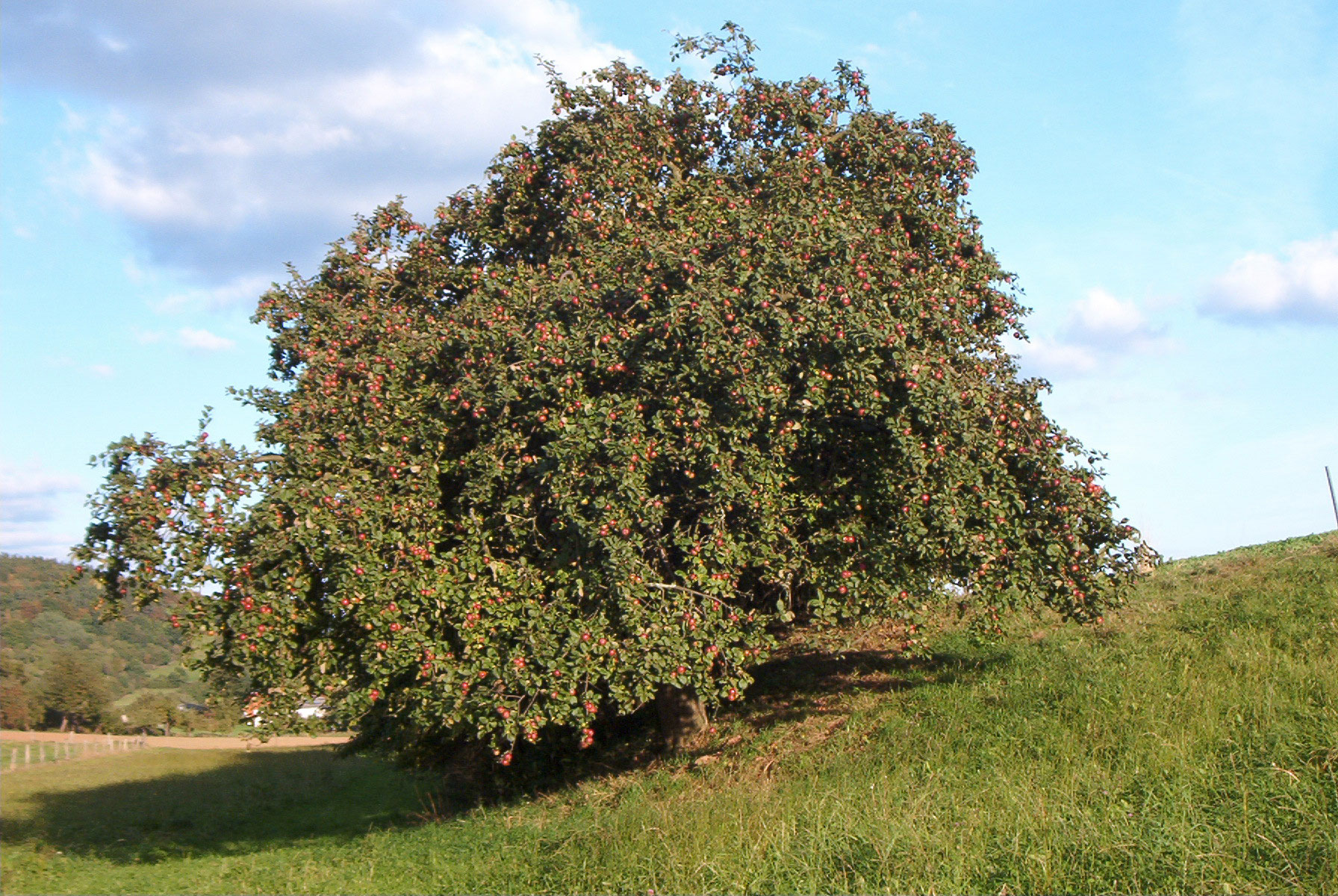
An apple tree in Germany.

Hilda Ellis Davidson draws links to the sword placed in Barnstokkr to marriage oaths performed with a sword in pre-Christian Germanic societies, noting a potential connection between the carrying of the sword by a young man before the bride at a wedding as a phallic symbol, indicating an association with fertility. Davidson cites records of wedding ceremonies and games in rural districts in Sweden involving trees or "stocks" as late as the 17th century, and cites a custom in Norway "surviving into recent times" for "the bridegroom to plunge his sword into the roof beam, to test the 'luck' of the marriage by the depth of the scar he made".

Davidson points out a potential connection between the descriptor apaldr (Old Norse "apple tree") and the birth of King Völsung, which is described earlier in the Völsunga saga as having occurred after Völsung's father Rerir sits atop a burial mound and prays for a son, after which the goddess Frigg has an apple sent to Rerir. Rerir shares the apple with his wife, resulting in his wife's long pregnancy. Davidson states that this mound is presumably the family burial mound, and proposes a link between the tree, fruit, mound, and the birth of a child.

Davidson opines that Siggeir's anger at his inability to gain the sword that Odin has plunged into Barnstokkr at first sight appears excessive, and states that there may be an underlying reason for Siggeir's passionate desire for the sword. Davidson notes that the gift of the sword was made at a wedding feast, and states that Barnstokkr likely represents the 'guardian tree', "such as those that used to stand beside many a house in Sweden and Denmark, and which was associated with the 'luck' of the family", and that the 'guardian tree' also had a connection with the birth of children. Davidson cites Jan de Vries in that the name barnstokkr "used in this story was the name given to the trunk of such a tree because it used to be invoked and even clasped by the women of the family at the time of childbirth."

Providing examples of historical structures built around trees, or with 'guardian trees' around or in the structure in Germanic areas, Davidson states that the "'luck' of a family must largely depend on the successful bearing and rearing of sons, and there is a general belief that when a guardian tree is destroyed, the family will die out." In connection with this, Davidson theorizes that at the bridal feast, it should have been Siggeir, the bridegroom, who drew the sword from the tree, "and that its possession would symbolize the 'luck' which would come to him with his bride, and the successful continuation of his own line in the sons to be born of the marriage". The sword having been refused to him, Davidson theorizes that this may well have been intended as a deadly insult, and that this lends a tragic air to the scene in the hall.

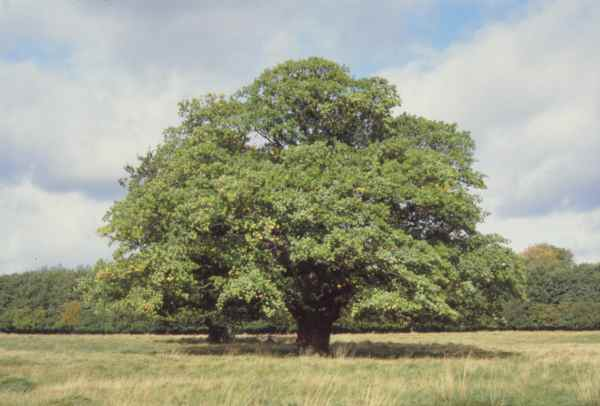
An oak tree in Denmark.

Jesse Byock (1990) states that the name Barnstokkr may not conceivably be the original name of the tree, and instead that it is possible that it may have originally been bran(d)stokkr', the first part of the compound potentially having been brandr, (meaning brand or firebrand), a word sometimes synonymous with "hearth", and pointing to a potential connection to the fire burning within the hall. Byock notes that the tree is called an eik (Old Norse "oak"), which has an unclear meaning as the Icelanders often employed the word as a general word for "tree", and the tree is also referred to as apaldr, which is also a general term for trees. Byock theorizes that the latter reference to an apple tree may imply a further symbolic meaning pointing to the apple tree of the goddess Iðunn, and that the Barnstokkr may be further identified with the world tree Yggdrasil.

Andy Orchard (1997) states that the role and placement of Barnstokkr as a "mighty tree, supporting and sprouting through the roof of Völsung's hall" has clear parallels in Norse mythology with the world tree Yggdrasil, particularly in relation to Yggdrasil's position to the hall of Valhalla. Orchard further points out parallels between Sigmund's ability to solely remove the sword from the trunk and King Arthur's drawing of the sword Excalibur.

== Modern influence ==
In Richard Wagner's Der Ring des Nibelungen opera cycle, the tree appears as Barnstock, when the hero Siegmund, with a great tug, pulls from it a sword that he names Nothung. The tree however is in the house of Hunding, who takes the place of Siggeir as husband of Sieglinde and enemy of Siegmund. Barnstokkr has been theorized as English author and philologist J. R. R. Tolkien's immediate source for a scene in his 1954 work The Lord of the Rings depicting the fictional character of Frodo Baggins and his acceptance of the weapon Sting after it has been thrust "deep into a wooden beam". Some of the structures described in Tolkien's Lord of the Rings have been described as "recalling" the position and placement of Barnstokkr in Völsunga saga, with which Tolkien was familiar.

== See also ==
- Glasir, the golden tree that stands before Valhalla.
- Læraðr, a tree that sits atop Valhalla, grazed upon by a goat and a hart.
- Sacred tree at Uppsala, an evergreen tree before the Temple of Uppsala.
- Rama breaking Shiva's bow Pinaka at his wedding with Sita
