= Northern Swabians =

The Northern Swabians (German: Nordschwaben; Latin: Norsavi, Nordosquavi) were a people of early medieval Germania living in and giving their name to the Schwabengau.

== History ==
They are mentioned as the Norsavi in a letter from the Frankish king Theudebert I to the Roman emperor Justinian I in 534. They are the second people listed as having submitted to the Franks, after the Thuringians. They may have submitted following the Frankish–Thuringian war of 531. They apparently lived in the north of Thuringian territory. They were probably subject to the Thuringians before coming into the Frankish orbit.

Gregory of Tours records that when in 568 the Lombards abandoned their territory and moved into Italy, taking some Saxons with them, the Franks settled Suavos et alias gentes ('Swabians and other peoples') in the vacated areas. These Swabians are usually identified with the Norsavi of the slightly earlier source. Gregory's story of Suevi settling in territory abandoned by Saxons at the time the Lombards invaded Italy is repeated in the late 8th century by Paul the Deacon in his History of the Lombards and in the mid-10th century by Widukind of Corvey in The Deeds of the Saxons. Widukind calls the settlers Suavi Transbadani, Suevi beyond the Bode. The area settled is usually identified as an area south of the Bode, a territory called the pagus Suevia ('country [of] Swabia') in a document issued by King Henry I in 934. Widukind adds that the Suavi have different laws from the rest of the Saxons.

Archaeological evidence shows that the area between the Bode and the Unstrut lay within the Frankish cultural sphere until the late 7th century, when there is evidence of a shift towards Saxon culture. According to the Vita Bonifatii of Willibald, the Thuringian duke Heden was so tyrannical that a portion of the people transferred their allegiance voluntarily to the Saxons. This is probably a reference to the Northern Swabians. The Annals of Metz, under the year 748, treat the region as a part of Saxony and identify the Nordosquavi as Saxons. The Annals of Fulda under the year 852 and the Annals of Xanten under 868 distinguish them from the Saxons and Thuringians.

The distinctiveness of the people and the region survived into the 13th century. The Sachsenspiegel considers the Saxons of the Schwabengau as geborene Swaben ('born Swabian'). A Latin tract of the late 12th or early 13th century, De origine gentis Swevorum, claims that the Northern Swabians migrated from Scandinavia, settling in Thuringia in 555–556 following a war with the Franks and Thuringians.

== Identity ==
Reinhard Wenskus identified the Northern Swabians as a remnant of the ancient Semnones. Robert Gordon Latham differentiated the Norsavi of Theudebert's letter from the settlers mentioned by Gregory, Paul and Widukind. The former were a product of the breakup of the Suevi mentioned in Ptolemy's Geography. Latham identifies the Norsavi with the Anglii and Warini who received their own law code. This supports identifying the Swæfe of the poem Widsith—who lived in close proximity to the Anglii—with the Northern Swabians.

Matthias Springer regards the term "northern Swabians" as intended to distinguish the inhabitants of the area that came to be known as Swabia (i.e., the Alemanni) from the Suevi who migrated into Gallaecia. This hypothesis cannot explain the naming of the Schwabengau.

== Bibliography ==
- Bachrach, Bernard S.; Bachrach, David S., eds. (2014). Widukind of Corvey: Deeds of the Saxons. Catholic University of America Press.
- Clay, John-Henry (2020). "Boniface in Hessia and Thuringia". In Michel Aaij; Shannon Goodlove (eds.). A Companion to Boniface. Brill. pp. 270–298.
- Green, Dennis Howard; Siegmund, Frank, eds. (2003). The Continental Saxons from the Migration Period to the Tenth Century: An Ethnographica Perspective. The Boydell Press.
- Kälble, Mathias (2009). "Ethnogenese und Herzogtum Thüringen im Frankenreich (6.–9. Jahrhundert)". In Helmut Castritius; Dieter Geuenich; Matthias Werner (eds.). Die Frühzeit der Thüringer: Archäologie, Sprache, Geschichte. De Gruyter. pp. 329–413.
- Latham, Robert Gordon (1862). The English Language (5th revised ed.). Walton and Maberly.
- Leleu, Laurence (2012). "Les sources saxonnes et la spatialisation du pouvoir en Saxe, IX^{e}–XI^{e} siècles: Premiers résultats". Territorium: 1–39.
- Plassmann, Alheydis (2016). "De origine gentis Swevorum". In Graeme Dunphy (ed.). Encyclopedia of the Medieval Chronicle (Online ed.). Brill. doi:10.1163/2213-2139_emc_SIM_00864.
- Tyrrell, Vida Alice (2012). Merovingian Letters and Letter Writers (PDF) (PhD diss.). University of Toronto.
- Wood, Ian (2003). "Beyond Satraps and Ostriches: Political and Social Structures of the Saxons in the Early Carolingian Period". In Dennis Howard Green; Frank Siegmund (eds.). The Continental Saxons from the Migration Period to the Tenth Century: An Ethnographica Perspective. The Boydell Press. pp. 271–297.
