= De bono mortis =

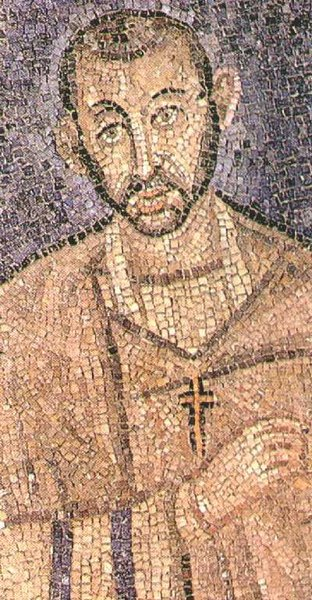
Detail from possibly contemporary mosaic (c. 380–500) of Ambrose in the Basilica of Sant'Ambrogio

De bono mortis ("Death as a good") is a sermon by St. Ambrose (340–397), a Doctor of the Church. The text, which argues that death is not a bad thing to be feared, was written between 387 and 391. A companion piece or supplement to his De Iacob, it was composed "as two sermons, perhaps for the catechumens awaiting baptism at Easter". Profoundly informed by neoplatonism, it is one of the texts through which Augustine of Hippo, Ambrose's pupil in Milan, came under the influence of that philosophy.

== Content and importance ==
Ambrose argues that death is a good thing feared only by the foolish. The death of the body (other deaths he identifies are those of sin and to sin) is an emancipation of the soul, now free from the body, which is to be desired by all.

The "three deaths" Ambrose distinguishes are "death to sin so as to live to God; death as the completion of this present life; and the death of the soul due to sin". The death of the body ("natural death", or "death as the completion of this present life") is, far from being bad or even neutral, a good thing. According to Pierre Hadot, Ambrose derives this doctrine to a great extent from Origen; his neo-platonism—the language of Plato and Plotinus he received through Porphyry.

De bono mortis, as does his De Isaac vel anima, contains passages derived from Plotinus's Enneads, and the two exerted an influence on Augustine of Hippo, who was living in Milan teaching rhetoric and studying neoplatonism, and may have listened to them as sermons. One of the medieval codices that contains De bono mortis is the eighth-century Ragyndrudis Codex, a collection traditionally thought to have been used by Saint Boniface to protect himself during his martyrdom in 754.

== Editions and translations ==
Ambrose's writings are well preserved. An early edition was prepared by Desiderius Erasmus and printed in Basel by Johann Froben, in 1527. The subsequent so-called "Roman" edition was ordered by popes Pius IV and Pius V; it was started by Felice Peretti di Montalto, then a Franciscan friar and later pope Sixtus V. This edition was published in five volumes between 1580 and 1585, and is said to "supersede all others, until the publication of the excellent work of the Benedictines"—that is, the edition published in the Patrologia Latina, vols. 14–17, which is sometimes still used in modern times "for the sake of clarity". Recent editions of the text are by Felicita Portalupi (University of Turin, 1961) and William Theodore Wiesner (Catholic University of America, 1970). Both those editions are based on the 1896 Latin text by Karl Schenkl for the Corpus Scriptorum Ecclesiasticorum Latinorum, as is the Catholic University's translation of seven of Ambrose's works, including De bono mortis.
