= Elder Mother =

Figure in English and Scandinavian folklore

The Elder Mother is an elder-guarding being in English and Scandinavian folklore known by a variety of names, such as the Danish Hyldemoer ("Elder-Mother") and the Lincolnshire names Old Lady and Old Girl.

== In England ==
The Elder Mother is thought to be the guardian of the elder trees, and it was said, until recent times in various parts of England and Scandinavia that to take wood from the elder tree one would have to ask the Elder Mother first, or else ill luck would befall the woodsman. The woodsman would have to ask the Elder Mother like so:

"Old girl, give me some of thy wood and I will give thee some of mine when I grow into a tree."

One such story of the Elder Mother's revenge concerns a writer earlier in the 20th century.

When calling in on the mother of a sick child, the mother told him:

"It were all along of my maister’s thick ‘ead. It were in this ‘ow't’ rocker comed off t'cradle, and he hadn’t no more gumption than to mak’ a new ‘un out on illerwood (elder wood) without axing the Old Lady’s leave, and in course she didn’t like that, and she came and pinched the wean that outrageous he were a’most black in t’ face; but I bashed un off, and putten an eshen on, and the wean is gallus as owt agin."

Another tale, from Somerset, casts the Elder Mother as the villain, a witch that a farmer sees as an elder milking his cow. The farmer shoots at the witch with a silver bullet but misses and is chased back into the farmhouse. The old granny, however, picks up the burning coal from the fire with a shovel and throws it at the elder tree, burning cinders, and thus the witch is dead.

A tale from Northamptonshire tells of man who cut a stick from an elder, and saw that the tree was bleeding. Later he meets the local witch and sees that she has a bloodied bandage on her arm.

Another tale not only has the elder-tree witch (sometimes later claimed to be various famous characters such as Mother Shipton) as the somewhat dubious heroine, but also with saving England from being conquered by a king and his knights (sometimes said to be Danes). This is also the story of how the Rollright Stones that lie on the border between Oxfordshire and Warwickshire came to be. When the king and his knights marched towards Long Compton they came upon a witch who told the king:

"Seven long strides thou shalt take,

And if Long Compton thou shalt see,

King of England thou shalt be."

The king however went onwards saying:

"Stick, stock, stone
As King of England I shall be known."

However, on the King's seventh stride a hill rose up before Long Compton making him unable to see the town. The witch was there again with her chant:

"As Long Compton thou canst not see

King of England thou shalt not be.
Rise up stick and stand still stone
For King of England thou shalt be none;
Thou and thy men hoar stones shall be

And I myself an eldern tree."

And thus the king and his knights were turned to stone and the witch turned herself into an elder tree.

== In Denmark ==
In Denmark, the Hyldemoer (“Elder-mother”) or Hyldequinde (“Elder-woman”) is a spirit like a wood-nymph or dryad that lives in the elder tree. The spirit is said to haunt or torment people who build from elder wood unless they ask permission first.

== Similar and related beliefs ==
In Denmark, an elder twig put in the mouth was traditionally thought to drive out evil spirits and thus could cure toothache. Also in Denmark, if you were to stand under an elder on Midsummer's Eve you could see the Elf-king and his host. A similar tradition existed in Scotland where it was said to happen on All Hallows or Samhain.

In England, it was thought that the elder tree could never be hit by lightning and that carrying the twigs of an elder could protect their bearer from rheumatism. Farmers used to protect their animals from evil by placing a cross made from elder on their cow-sheds and barns.

In some Slavic countries, such as Russia, it is thought that the tree had the power to ward off evil. In Sicily, it was claimed to have the power to ward off snakes.

== See also ==
- Askafroa
- Sacred trees and groves in Germanic paganism and mythology
