= Askafroa =

Legendary creature in folklore

The Askafroa (Swedish: wife of the ash tree), also known as the Danish Askefrue is a type of legendary creature in Scandinavian folklore, similar to the Greek Hamadryads. The Askafroa is the guardian (tutelary deity) of the ash tree. The Askafroa was thought to be a malicious creature that did much damage, and to appease her, it was necessary to make a sacrifice to her on Ash Wednesday.

The Askafroa lives in ash trees in the Scania region of Sweden, and is said to be a very dangerous creature. She is the soul of the tree and if it is cut down, she will exert revenge. To appease her, one must provide offerings every Ash Wednesday by pouring water on her roots and declaring: "I am offering to you so that you do us no harm".

The ash tree has a very prominent place in Nordic mythology. It was, together with the oak tree, the most magical tree to which special powers were assigned, such as the ability to stop blood flow or as an antidote to snake poison. The mythological tree Yggdrasil was also an ash tree.

The Swedish scholar Hyltén-Cavallius recorded in his ethnographic work Wärend och Wirdarne a belief of a female creature living in the ash tree, in Ljunit Hundred. The elders sacrificed to the Askafroa on the morning of Ash Wednesday. Before the sun had risen, they poured water over the roots of the ash tree. While doing this, they said: "Nu offrar jag, så gör du oss ingen skada", meaning "Now I sacrifice [to you], so that you do us no harm". Hyltén-Cavallius further writes that they believed that if anyone broke branches or twigs from the ash tree, they would become ill.

== Popular culture ==
- The online role-playing game Dark Age of Camelot features enemies in the form of Askefruer/Askafroa.
- A similar narrative is found in the Swedish children's book Furan by Lisen Adbåge where a family moves to a cottage and starts cutting down trees, whereupon the trees take revenge and start invading the cottage. In the end, the whole family is turned into trees themselves.

== See also ==
- Elder Mother
- Sacred trees and groves in Germanic paganism and mythology
