= Spirit guide (disambiguation) =

A spirit guide, in the spiritualism, is an entity that remains as a discarnate spirit to act as a guide or protector to a living incarnated individual.

Spirit guide may also refer to:

- Guardian angel, a type of angel that is assigned to protect and guide a particular person, group or nation
- Shoulder angel, an angel representing conscience
- Spiritual direction, the practice of being with people as they attempt to deepen their relationship with the divine, or to learn and grow in their personal spirituality
- "Spirit Guide" (song), a 2017 song by Decrepit Birth
- Totem, a spirit being, sacred object, or symbol that serves as an emblem of a group of people

== See also ==
- Guardian spirit (disambiguation)
