= Ragyndrudis Codex =

Codex from the Middle Ages

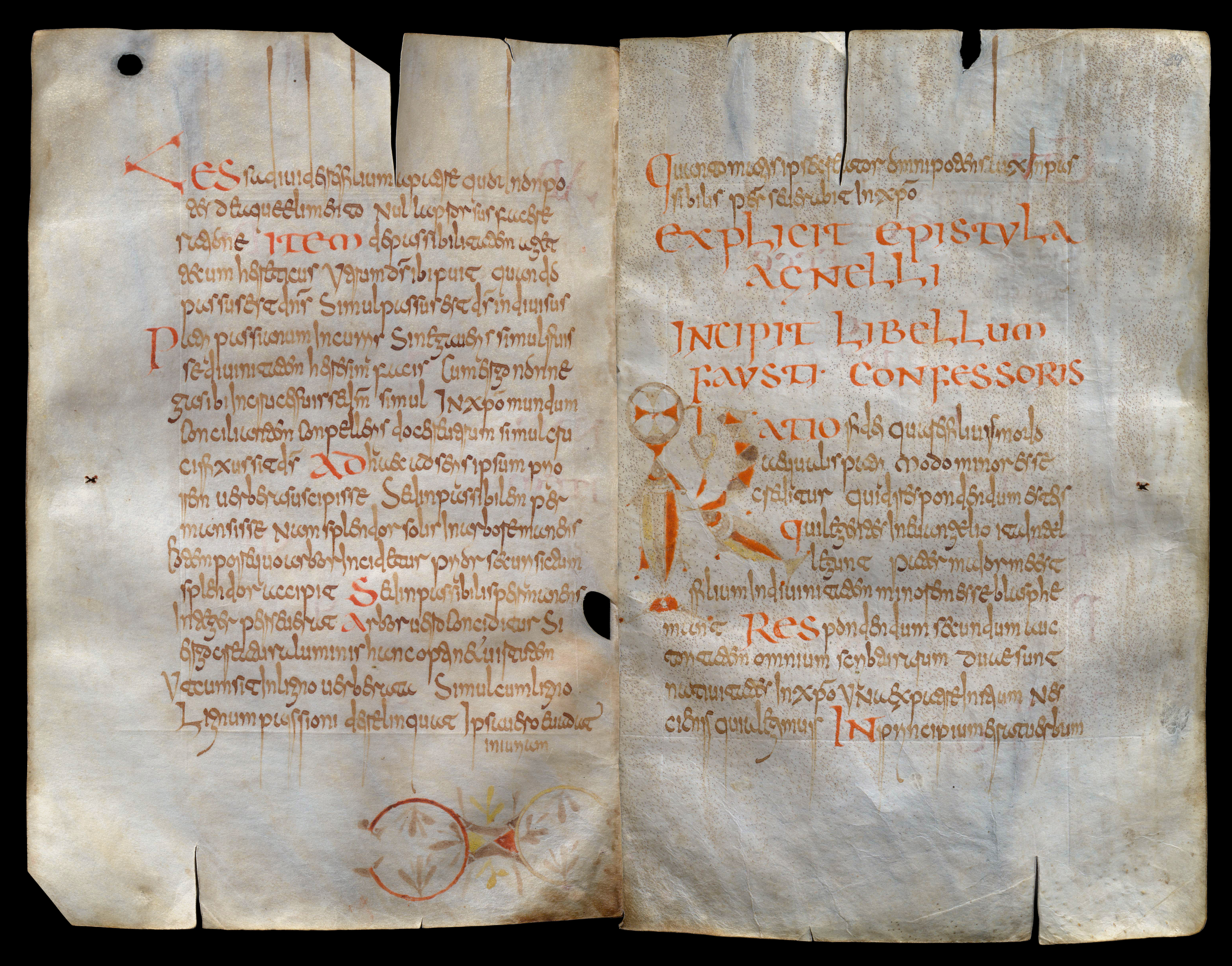
Excerpt from the Ragyndrudis Codex. It bears parallel nail holes on the margins of each page.

The Ragyndrudis Codex (Codex Bonifatianus II) is an early medieval codex of religious texts, now in Fulda in Germany, which is closely associated with Saint Boniface, who according to tradition used it at the time of his martyrdom to ward off the swords or axes of the Frisians who killed him on 5 June 754 near Dokkum, Friesland. This long association has given the codex the status of a contact relic.

The earliest source considered as evidence for a connection between the eighth-century codex and Boniface is in a tenth-century vita of the saint written in Utrecht, which says that the saint held a gospel over his head as protection. The Ragyndrudis Codex is not a gospel, but rather a collection of texts on exegesis, apologia, and dogma, but this has not prevented the Codex from being regarded as the saint's shield, an idea enforced by deep cuts through the (original) binding and pages. The Codex is held in the Domschatz, the treasury of the Fulda Cathedral; a facsimile is on display in the cathedral's museum.

== Name and background ==
The Ragyndrudis Codex is one of three "Bonifatian" books, a set of three manuscripts traditionally considered to have been in the possession of Saint Boniface. The others are the so-called Victor Codex (Codex Bonifatianus I) and the Cadmug Gospel (Codex Bonifatianus III). All Codices Bonifatiani are held in Fulda, though in different locations: I and III are held in the Hessian State Library in Fulda, and II is held in the Domschatz of Fulda Cathedral, on loan from the library of the Fulda seminary. All three Codices Bonifatiani have eighth-century bindings. Facsimiles of the Ragyndrudis Codex are on display in the cathedral's museum and in the Hessian State Library: three facsimiles of the Ragyndrudis Codex were made by Ludwig Ritterpusch on the occasion of Pope John Paul II's visit to Fulda in 1980.

First mention of the three as a set pertaining to the life of Boniface was made by the Jesuit Nicolaus Serarius (1555–1609), who described the three in a vita of the saint (1604).

=== Codices Bonifatiani I and III ===
The Victor Codex, Codex Bonifatianus I, also known as the Codex Fuldensis, was produced in the middle of the sixth century for Victor of Capua, and is known for its content, script, and history. It contains a Gospel harmony and is an important witness for a number of textual cruxes in the New Testament. Victor himself corrected and edited the manuscript, and signed off on it on a date that translates to the 12 April 547. It was long thought that a particular turn of phrase found also in Boniface's correspondence was evidence of his having used the manuscript, but Malcolm Parkes proved that the phrase was added to the Codex by an eighth-century scribe in Fulda after Boniface's death. Bonifatius Fischer believes that the glosses in the margin of the Epistle of James could well be by the saint, since they are written in a southern English hand in the early eighth century. The binding was probably made in Northumbria.

The Cadmug Gospel, Codex Bonifatianus III, is a small "pocket gospel book" from the second half of the eighth century. The name "Cadmug" (also read as "Vidrug" and "Cadmag") appears on 65r; on the verso, is noted—erroneously—that Boniface himself wrote the manuscript, an error dating from the time when it was loaned to Arnulf of Carinthia, at the end of the ninth century.

=== Ragyndrudis Codex ===
The name "Ragyndrudis" is found on folio 2v, in a Latin phrase: in honore dni nostri ihu xpi ego ragyndrudis ordinaui librum istum ("in honour of our Lord Jesus Christ, I Ragyndrudis arranged this book"). No successful identification with a historical Ragyndrudis has been made, but a laywoman called Ragyndrugis who was linked (through marriage) to the Abbey of Saint Bertin in Saint-Omer, France, is a likely candidate according to Rosamond McKitterick.

The manuscript is written in a Luxeuil-derived minuscule from the late seventh or early eighth century; McKitterick argues the origin may be Corbie Abbey in Picardy in northern France – the abbey was founded by monks from Luxeuil, and scribes from the continent and the British Isles worked side by side there: the handwriting shows both continental and insular characteristics. Additionally, there are eighth-century corrections and glosses in an Anglo-Saxon hand.

== Contents ==
The Codex contains 14 texts pertaining to exegesis, apologia, and dogma.

While some sources report that the codex is "a collection of mainly anti-Arian texts", this is not entirely correct—the codex contains a number of those (short) texts, but it also contains Ambrose's De bono mortis and Isidore of Seville's Synonyma. The Ragyndrudis Codex is one of many codices containing the Synonyma, a text connected with Anglo-Saxon monastic foundations on the continent. The text of the Decretum Gelasianum is the earliest complete manuscript copy.

1. Epistola Leo I papae ad Flavianum episcopum Constantinopolitanum, 2v-11v
2. Theodoro episcopo Foroiulensi Leo urbis Romae episcopus, 11v-14v
3. Disputatio beati Cerealis episcopi Castellensis contra Maximinum Arriomanitam, 14v-34v
4. Epistula Agnelli episcopi Ravennatensis ad Arminium De ratione fidei, 34r-39r
5. Libellum Fausti confessoris episcopus Reiensis De ratione fidei, 39r-45r
6. Fides edita sancti Ambrosii episcopi De spiritu sancto, 45r-47v
7. Testimonia de deo patri et filio et spiritu sancto, 47v-53v
8. Regula fidei catholicae facta a Nicena, 53v-55r
9. Regula fidei secundum CCCXVIII patris, 55r-55v
10. Regula fidei caholicae contra omnes hereses Hieronimi presbyteri, 56r-57r
11. Explanacio fidei catholicae (Decretum Gelasianum), 57r-61v
12. Sancti Ambrosii De bono mortis, 62r-96r
13. Notitio regionum et civitatum quibus sanctorum apostolorum et evangelistarum venerabilia corpora requiescunt (De locis apostolorum), 96r-97r
14. Liber sancti Ysidori episcopi (Synonyma de lamentatione animae peccatricis), 98v-143r

== Legacy ==
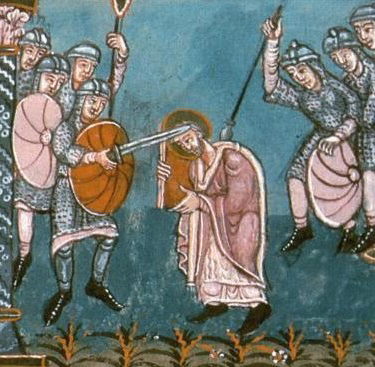
One of the earliest images of Saint Boniface using a book as protection. Detail from Fuldaer Sakramentar, ca. 975.

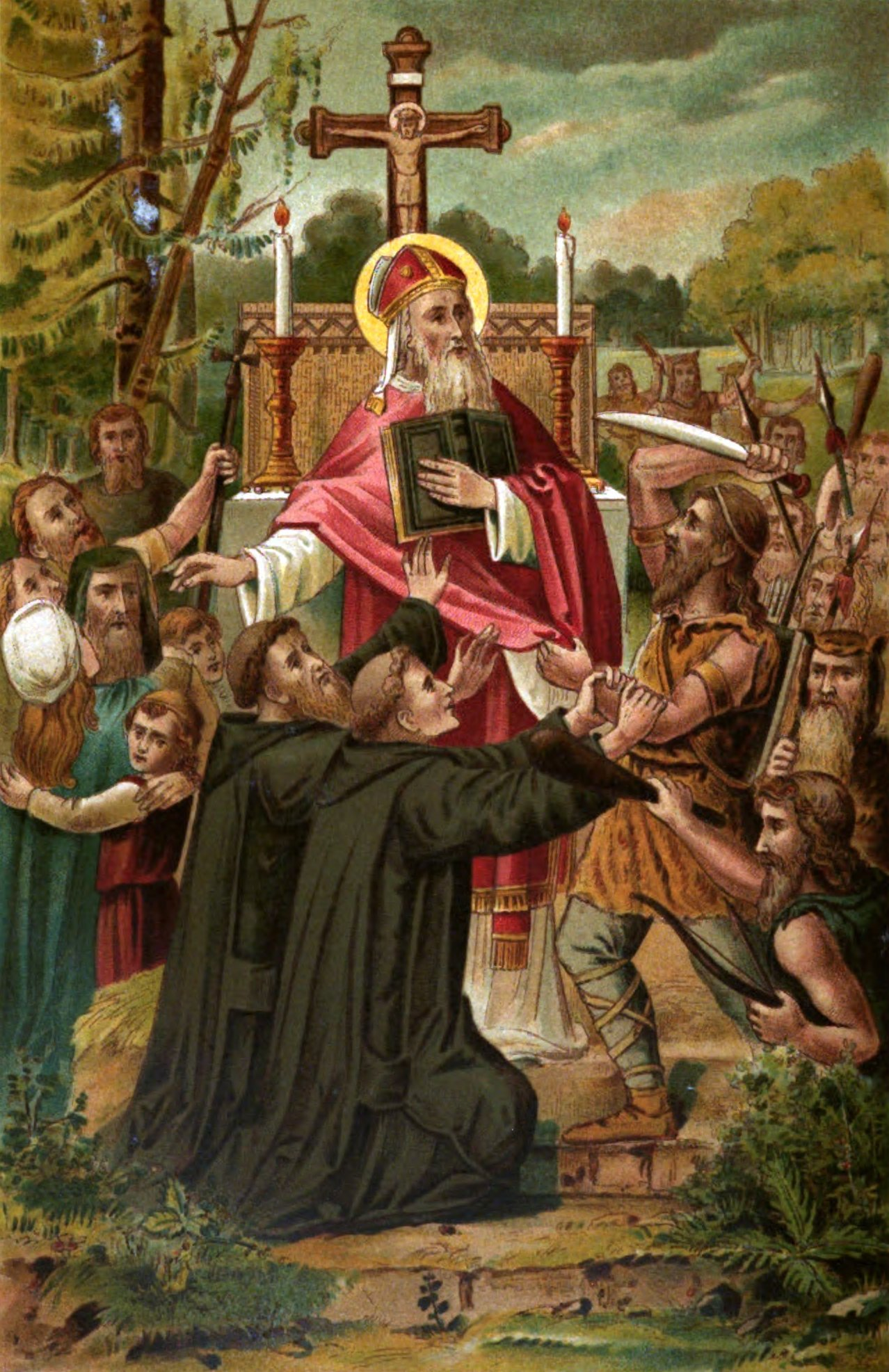
1903 depiction of St Boniface's martyrdom, the saint holding a book in front of his chest.

The legacy of the codex is based on the life and death of Saint Boniface who, in 753, had gone off to Friesland one more time to try and convert the Frisians. On the morning of June 5, 754, Boniface, camping in the Frisian countryside with 50 or so comrades, was getting ready to accept new converts, when the camp was overrun by pagan bandits who killed all the missionaries and destroyed their possessions. While the earliest hagiographical accounts of Boniface and his martyrdom had him order his comrades to lay down their arms and accept martyrdom willingly, later accounts added that he held a book over his head to protect himself – this is what Boniface scholar Lutz von Padberg calls the Schutzhypothese, the "protection hypothesis", and it has become an enduring image of the saint.

The first account to include this detail is the so-called Vita altera Bonifatii, which was written in Utrecht (the closest Frankish/Christian settlement to Friesland) and which is preserved in a revision ascribed to Utrecht's bishop, Radbod, who held the seat from 900–917. It is repeated in most other vitae that followed, of which Otloh of St. Emmeram's (eleventh century) is the most important. This book, though it is called a "gospel" in the Utrecht and Otloh vitae, is usually identified with the Ragyndrudis Codex. Adding to the Schutzhypothese are five deep cuts which appear to strengthen the theory, but von Padberg argues that the position and character of the cuts do not match the hypothesis; in addition, Boniface was an uncommonly tall man, which makes it even more unlikely that such cuts would have been made while he held the Codex over his head. According to von Padberg, the Codices Bonifatiani must have left Utrecht and been in Fulda in 825, or the Utrecht tradition would have more clearly identified them. Images of the saint holding up a book for protection are being produced in Fulda by the year 970, when a series of sacramentaries are illustrated with images of Boniface's work as a missionary and his martyrdom.

That Boniface would have carried a collection of books with him on his journeys is without doubt. Whether the Ragyndrudis Codex was one of those books is not – its contents appear unrelated to any missionary work, and it is certainly not a gospel. Still, it is possible that it was one of the books that were found afterward in Friesland and brought back to Utrecht, whence they traveled up the Rhine to Mainz and then Fulda. Marco Mostert considers it possible, even likely, that Radbod's recension of the vita made its way to Fulda, where the legend became attached to the damaged books that could have been Boniface's, and that by the tenth century the status of these books had been elevated to that of contact relics.

A 2012 article in Der Spiegel reported that recent investigations found evidence of a nail having been driven through the book, which could have been the result of the book being nailed to a tree, in a Germanic, anti-Christian ritual.

Michael Drout supposes that J. R. R. Tolkien's Book of Mazarbul in The Fellowship of the Ring, especially its physical condition, owes something to the Ragyndrudis Codex.
