= Caill Tomair =

Former Norse sacred grove in Ireland

Caill Tomair (Middle Irish "Thor's Grove"), or Þorsviðr in Old Norse, was a sacred grove dedicated to the North Germanic god Thor. Though its exact location is uncertain, it is believed to have been located near the Norse-Gaelic city of Dublin. According to Cogadh Gáedhel re Gallaib, a 12th-century Munster chronicle that glorifies Brian Boru's campaigns against Norse and Gaelic rivals, The grove was destroyed by forces led by Brian Boru early in the year 1000 AD.

According to scholar Poul Holm, the grove was likely targeted due to its role among the local population:

[Caill Tomair] must have been a sacred wood and was deliberately cut down by Brian Boru of Munster when he conquered the town at Christmas in the year 1000. The cutting was a considerable undertaking and may have been conducted to clear an open passage to the town as much as to undercut a pagan rite which by then must have been rapidly declining.

According to the Cogadh Gáedhel re Gallaib, when Brian Boru captured Dublin in the year 1000, his forces symbolically destroyed Caill Tomair by cutting it down and burning it. This act represented the subjugation of the Norse and the dismantling of their religious and cultural symbols. The destruction was so impactful that it was still being remembered 14 years later, during the Battle of Clontarf in 1014, when the chaos of battle was likened to the felling and burning of the grove.

== Possible location ==
Historian Seán Duffy, in his 2014 work on Brian Boru, suggests Caill Tomair was located near Dublin but outside the main settlement; he speculates it may have been in the area of what is now Phoenix Park.

== See also ==
- Donar's Oak, an oak dedicated to Thor cut down by Anglo-Saxon Missionary Saint Boniface in the 8th century
