= Willibald of Mainz =

Willibald of Mainz was an Anglo-Saxon priest and author. Born in Wessex, he was living in Mainz when he was commissioned by Archbishop Lullus and Bishop Megingoz of Würzburg to write a biography of the late missionary-saint Boniface. He is called Willibald of Mainz to distinguish him from Willibald of Eichstätt, although it has been suggested that the two might be one person.

Start of the Vita Bonifatii in the earliest manuscript, from c. 800

Written in Latin probably between 763 and 768, Willibald's Vita Bonifatii ('Life of Boniface') (Note: Or Liber sancti Bonifatii, 'Book of Saint Boniface'.) is the earliest known biography from the Germanic-speaking world. Willibald had never met Boniface but he interviewed those who had. There is debate over whether he made use of Boniface's correspondence. In the Vita, for example, he does not mention the foundation of the abbey of Fulda or several other events prominent in the correspondence. He is the source, however, for Boniface's felling of the Oak of Jupiter.

In his prologue, Willibald refers to interest in the life of Boniface coming from as far away as Tuscany, the frontiers of Gaul and "the furthest reaches of Britain", suggesting that his intended readership was international. Among his models were histories of Pseudo-Hegesippus and Eusebius of Caesarea, and the Dialogues of Gregory the Great. He wrote in a distinctive Anglo-Latin style modelled after that of Aldhelm.

Willibald's Vita Bonifatii has eight chapters. The first is devoted to Boniface's childhood, seeking to demonstrate that he had desired to be a monk from a very young age. The next two chapters cover his education and early preaching career. Chapters 4–7 concern his missions among the pagans (and Christians) of Germania. Chapter 8 recounts his martyrdom, the transfer of his relics to Fulda and a few posthumous miracles. A ninth chapter reporting a miracle that occurred during Boniface's mission in Frisia was added somewhat later by another author and is not found in all manuscripts.
