= De origine gentis Swevorum =

Rubricated (red) title and initial in the 14th-century manuscript Paris, Bibliothèque nationale de France, MS Latin 4895 A

Start of the text in the earliest manuscript

De origine gentis Swevorum (or Origo gentis Swevorum) is a short anonymous Latin tract on the origins of the northern Swabians, the inhabitants of the Nordschwabengau in Saxony. The earliest manuscript (Biblioteca Apostolica Vaticana, Pal. lat. 1357) dates to about 1250 and the work itself was probably composed about that time or perhaps some decades earlier.

De origine gentis Swevorum is influenced by the accounts of Saxon origins in Rudolf of Fulda, Widukind of Corvey and the Annals of Quedlinburg and by the account of Lombard origins in Paul the Deacon's History of the Lombards. The author's purpose is to show that the northern Swabians had been settled in the Nordschwabengau since the year 555–556. It claims that they migrated there from the north. It describes wars between the northern Swabians and the Franks and Thuringians, but its historical reliability is doubtful.

== Editions ==
- Hirsch, Paul. De origo gentis Swevorum. Monumenta Germaniae Historica, Scriptores rerum Germanicarum. Hanover, 1935.
