= Vörðr =

Guardian spirit of Norse religion

In Norse mythology, a vǫrðr (Old Norse: [ˈwɔrðz̠], pl. varðir [ˈwɑrðez̠] or verðir [ˈwerðez̠] — "warden," "watcher" or "caretaker") is a warden spirit, believed to follow from birth to death the soul (Old Norse: hugr, see Hug (folklore)) of every person.

== History ==
In Old Swedish, the corresponding word is varþer; in modern Swedish vård. The belief in this type of guardian spirits remained strong in Scandinavian folklore up until the last centuries and continues to be found in northern faith based religions today. The English word '"wraith" is derived from vǫrðr, while "ward" and "warden" are cognates.

At times, the warden could reveal itself as a small light or as the shape of the person – see Hamr (folklore). The perception of another person's warden could cause a physical sensation such as an itching hand or nose, as a foreboding or an apparition. The warden could arrive before the actual person, which someone endowed with fine senses might perceive. The warden of a dead person could also become a revenant, haunting particular spots or individuals. In this case, the revenant warden was always distinct from more conscious undeads, such as the draugar.

Under the influence of Christianity, the belief in wardens changed in those adherent to the religion. Some view the spirit as being more akin to the Christian concept of a good and a bad conscience, while others view them as guardian angels.

== Warden trees ==
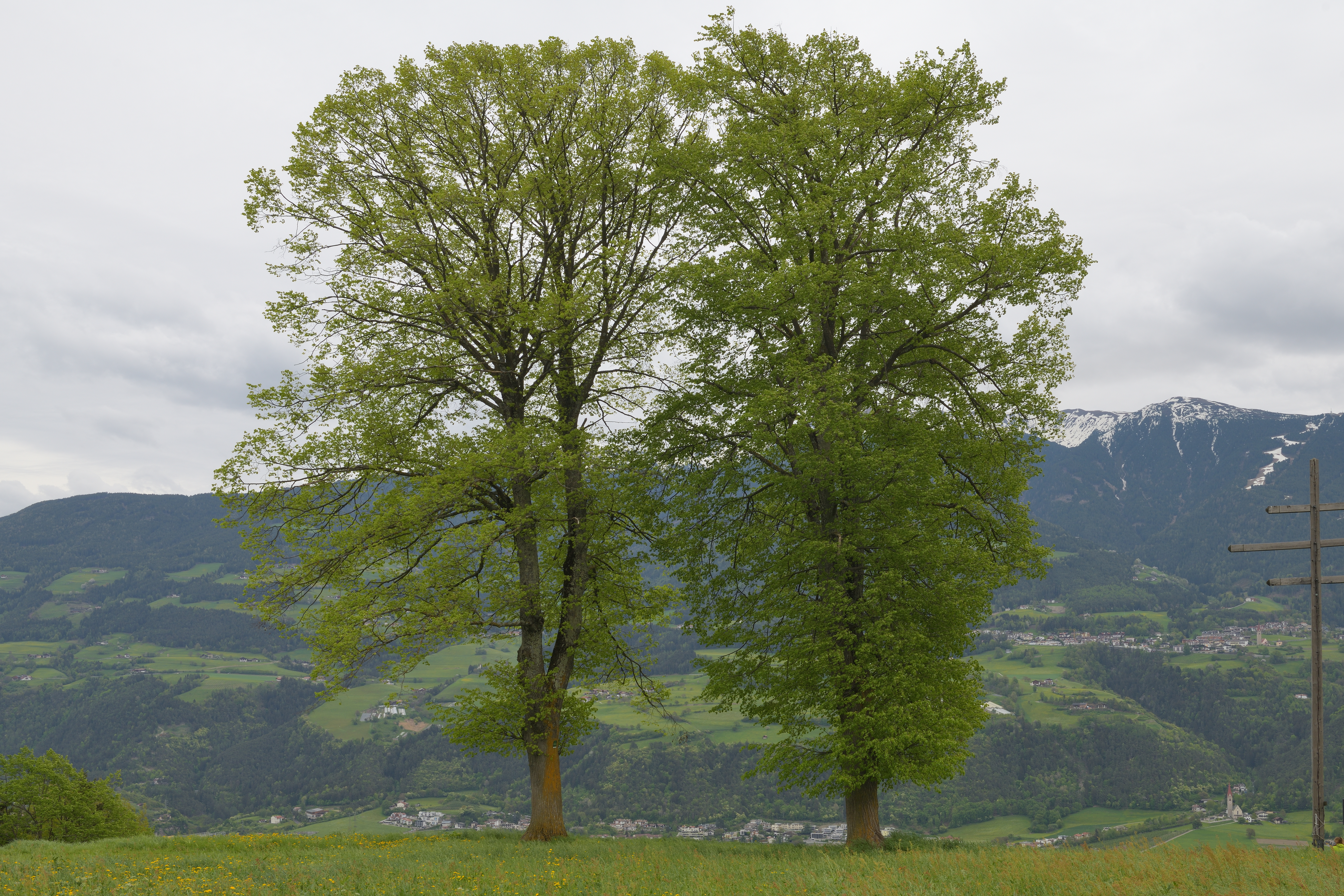
Linden tree

A very old tree (often a linden, ash or elm) growing on the farm lot could be dubbed a "warden tree" (Danish: værnetræ),(Swedish: vårdträd), or (Norwegian: tuntre) and was believed to defend it from bad luck. Breaking a leaf or twig from the warden tree was considered a serious offence. The respect for the tree was so great that the family housing it could adopt a surname related to it, such as Linnæus, Lindelius and Almén. It was often believed that the wights (Swedish vättar) of the yard lived under the roots of the warden tree, and to them, one sacrificed treats to be freed from disease or bad luck. The Guardian trees were said to have been taken from sacred groves as saplings by pre Christian Germanic peoples, though today can be planted from anywhere.

== See also ==
- Fylgja
- Hamingja
- Huginn and Muninn
- Luonto (Finnish paganism)
- Fravashi
- Guardian spirit (disambiguation)
