= Lutz von Padberg =

German historian (1950–2026)

Lutz E. von Padberg (22 February 1950 – 16 July 2026) was a German historian whose specialty was medieval history and in particular the Christianization of the Germanic peoples. He was an expert on Saint Boniface, having written biographies of the saint and studies of his veneration.

== Life and career ==
Born in Essen, von Padberg received his doctorate from the Westfälische Wilhelms-Universität in Münster in 1980. His habilitation from the University of Paderborn followed in 1993, where he taught until 1999 as Privatdozent. Since 1999 he was a professor of medieval history in Paderborn. From 1986 until 1999 he also taught as a visiting professor at the Evangelical Theological Faculty Leuven, and since 1986 he taught historical theology at the Freie Theologische Hochschule Gießen. Von Padberg retired from teaching in 2013.

Von Padberg's early publications were on theology and feminism as a theological challenge, and since then published extensively on the work of Anglo-Saxon and other missionaries during the Christianization of the Germanic peoples. His Habilitationsschrift, Mission und Christianisierung, was published in 1995 by Franz Steiner Verlag, and is a synthesis of earlier research (especially by Arnold Angenendt and Otto Gerhard Oexle) on the social life of the missionaries and the social consequences of their activities; Von Padberg was praised as profoundly knowledgeable on the matter, and his book as a very useful synthesis with "exciting" interpretations.

He was an expert on the life and work of Saint Boniface, and his Der Ragyndrudis-Codex des hl. Bonifatius (with Hans-Walter Stork) is a comprehensive study of the Ragyndrudis Codex, a codex which occupies an important place in the veneration of the saint. In his 1996 monograph Studien zur Bonifatiusverehrung: Zur Geschichte des Codex Ragyndrudis und der Fuldaer Reliquien des Bonifatius von Padberg examines the so-called "protection hypothesis", the theory that the Ragyndrudis Codex was used by the saint to protect himself during his martyrdom in Dokkum in Friesland. He concludes that it is possible that this codex (with two other important codices which have also been saved for posterity and are held in Fulda) was indeed owned by the saint but that the physical evidence makes it unlikely that the "protection hypothesis", a recurring theme in images and vitae of the saint, is correct.

Von Padberg died in Münster on 16 July 2026, at the age of 76.

== Publications ==
- Die Bibel: Grundlage für Glauben, Denken und Erkennen. Prolegomena zu einer biblischen Erkenntnislehre. Neuhausen/Stuttgart: Hänssler, 1986.
- Der Ragyndrudis-Codex des hl. Bonifatius. Teilfaksimileausgabe im Originalformat der Handschrift und Kommentar. With Hans-Walter Stork. Paderborn: Bonifatius-Verlag; Fulda: Parzeller, 1994. ISBN 3-87088-811-3.
- Mission und Christianisierung: Formen und Folgen bei Angelsachsen und Franken im 7. und 8. Jahrhundert. Franz Steiner, Stuttgart 1995, ISBN 3-515-06737-X.
- Studien zur Bonifatiusverehrung: Zur Geschichte des Codex Ragyndrudis und der Fuldaer Reliquien des Bonifatius. Frankfurt: Josef Knecht, 1996. ISBN 3-7820-0752-2 (Fuldaer Hochschulschriften 25).
- Heilige und Familie: Studien zur Bedeutung familiengebundener Aspekte in den Viten des Verwandten- und Schülerkreises um Willibrord, Bonifatius und Liudger. 2nd edition. Mainz: Gesellschaft für mittelrheinische Kirchengeschichte, 1997. ISBN 3-929135-15-9 (Quellen und Abhandlungen zur mittelrheinischen Kirchengeschichte 83).
- Die Christianisierung Europas im Mittelalter. 2nd edition. Stuttgart: Reclam, 2009. ISBN 3-15-017015-X.
- Bücherverzeichnis zur Kirchengeschichte: Eine kommentierte Bibliographie. With Michael von Fürstenberg. Paderborn: Bonifatius-Verlag, 1999. ISBN 3-89710-061-4.
- Bonifatius: Missionar und Reformer. Munich: C. H. Beck, 2003. ISBN 3-406-48019-5 (C. H. Beck Wissen in der Beck’schen Reihe 2319).
- Die Inszenierung religiöser Konfrontationen. Theorie und Praxis der Missionspredigt im frühen Mittelalter. Stuttgart: Hiersemann, 2003. ISBN 3-7772-0324-6 (Monographien zur Geschichte des Mittelalters 51).
- Christianisierung im Mittelalter. Darmstadt/Stuttgart: Theiss, 2006. ISBN 3-8062-2006-9.
- In Gottes Namen? Von Kreuzzügen, Inquisition und gerechten Kriegen. Gießen/Basel: Brunnen, 2010, ISBN 978-3-7655-1753-2.
