= Guardian spirit =

Guardian spirit may refer to:

- Guardian angel, a type of angel that is assigned to protect and guide a particular person, group, or nation
- Patron saint, a saint who is regarded as the heavenly advocate of a nation, place, craft, activity, class, clan, family, or person
- Totem, a spirit being, sacred object, or symbol that serves as an emblem of a group of people
- Tutelary deity, a deity or spirit who is a guardian, patron, or protector of a particular place, geographic feature, person, lineage, nation, culture, or occupation

== See also ==
- Spirit guide (disambiguation)
