= Glasir =

In Norse mythology, Glasir (Old Norse "gleaming") is a tree or grove, described as "the most beautiful among gods and men", bearing golden red leaves located in the realm of Asgard, outside the doors of Valhalla. Glasir is attested in the 13th century Prose Edda book Skáldskaparmál where it receives three mentions, one of which mentions its location and all of which focus on the golden leaves of the tree. Glasislundr (Old Norse "Glasir's Grove") appears in the Poetic Edda poem Helgakviða Hjörvarðssonar.

== Attestations ==
The Poetic Edda poem Helgakviða Hjörvarðssonar opens in Glasislundr, where a talking bird offers his services in exchange for a sacrifice from the prince Atli Iðmundarson.

In chapter 32 of the Prose Edda book Skáldskaparmál, poetic means of referring to gold are provided, including "Glasir's foliage". In chapter 34, the question "why is gold called Glasir's foliage or leaves?" is posed. In response, Glasir is described as standing before the doors of the hall of Valhalla, all of its foliage red gold. An unattributed verse is then recorded:

Glasir stands with golden leaf before Sigtyr's [Odin's] halls.

Glasir is then described as the "most beautiful tree among gods and men". In a surviving fragment of the skaldic poem Bjarkamál located in chapter 45, Glasir is again listed as a kenning for gold ("Glasir's glowing foliage").

== See also ==
- Glæsisvellir
