= Sacred tree at Uppsala =

Historical pagan sacred tree

The sacred tree at Uppsala was a sacred tree that grew at the Temple at Uppsala, Sweden, in the second half of the 11th century. It is even more sparsely documented than the famous temple by which it stood. In the 1070s, the writer of a scholium in Adam of Bremen's Gesta Hammaburgensis ecclesiae pontificum explained:

Near that temple is a very large tree with widespread branches which are always green both in winter and summer. What kind of tree it is nobody knows. There is also a spring there where the pagan are accustomed to perform sacrifices and to immerse a human being alive. As long as his body is not found, the request of the people will be fulfilled.

It is not known what species it was. Scholarly debate has long described it as an ash tree, believing it to be of the same species as Yggdrasil, though Frits Läffler has suggested that it was a yew tree.

The description of the tree and the location of a well nearby are reminiscent of the evergreen Yggdrasil, which stood above the Well of Urd, and it is possible that the Swedes consciously had created a copy of the world of their Norse gods at Uppsala.

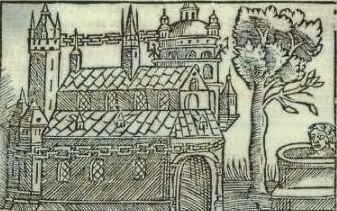
Image showing the sacred tree to the right of the temple, from Olaus Magnus' Historia de Gentibus Septentrionalibus (1555). To the right of the tree is a depiction of a man being sacrificed in the spring.

The later Icelandic source Hervarar saga contains a description of how the tree was used in the pagan rites, concerning an event taking place only a few years after the scholium was written. It is in reference to the ancient Indo-European ritual of horse sacrifice:

Svein, the King's brother-in-law, remained behind in the assembly, and offered the Swedes to do sacrifices on their behalf if they would give him the Kingdom. They all agreed to accept Svein's offer, and he was then recognized as King over all Sweden. A horse was then brought to the assembly and hewn in pieces and cut up for eating, and the sacred tree was smeared with blood. Then all the Swedes abandoned Christianity, and sacrifices started again. They drove King Ingi away; and he went into Västergötland.

== See also ==
- Sacred trees and groves in Germanic paganism and mythology
- List of individual trees
