= Saint Boniface =

Anglo-Saxon missionary and saint (died 754)

Saint Boniface OSB
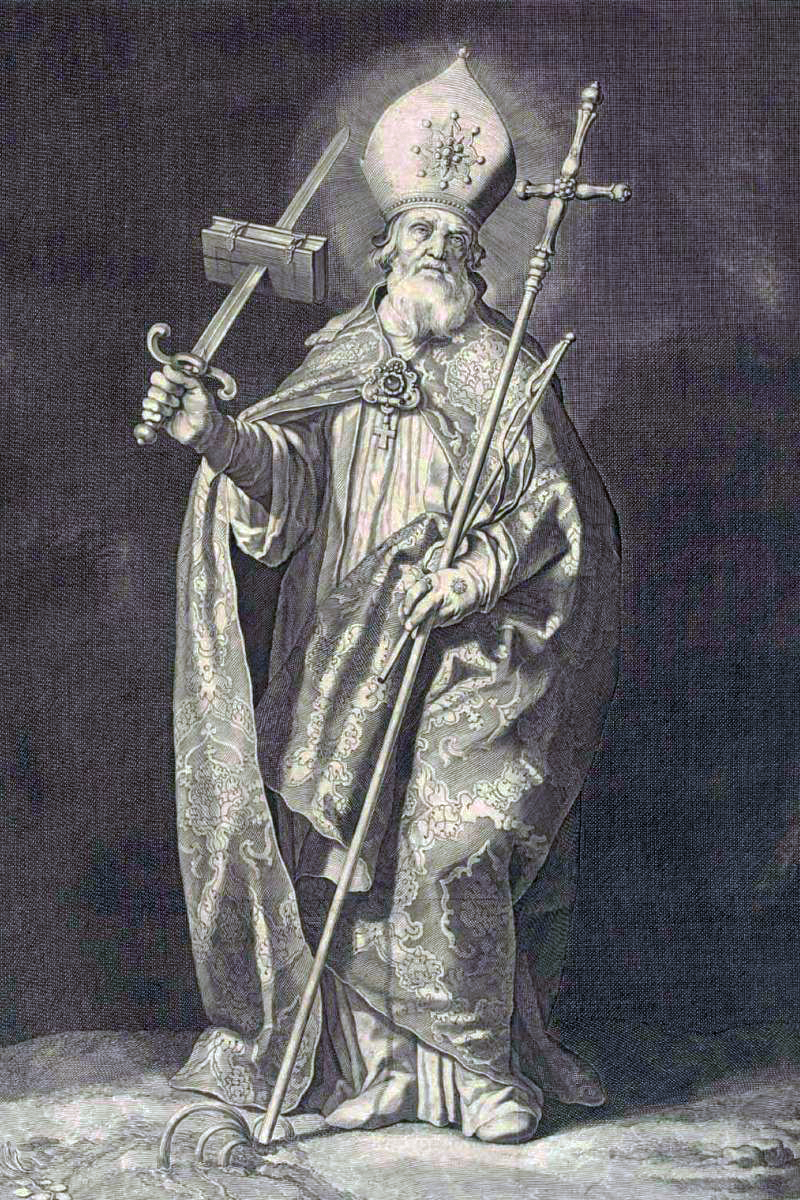
- Saint Boniface by Cornelis Bloemaert, c. 1630

Bishop Martyr Apostle to the Germans
- Born: c. 675; Crediton, Dumnonia
- Died: 5 June 754 (aged around 79) near Dokkum, Frisia
- Venerated in: Catholic Church; Lutheranism; Eastern Orthodox Church; Anglican Communion
- Major shrine: Fulda Cathedral; St Boniface Catholic Church, Crediton, England
- Feast: 5 June
- Attributes: In bishop's robes, book pierced by a sword (also axe; oak; scourge)
- Patronage: Fulda; Germania; England (Orthodox Church; jointly with St. Augustine of Canterbury, and St. Cuthbert of Lindisfarne. The Orthodox Church also recognises him as patron Saint of Germany); Devon; Winnipeg

Boniface (born Wynfreth; c. 675 – 5 June 754) was an English Benedictine monk and leading figure in the Anglo-Saxon mission to the Germanic parts of Francia during the eighth century. He organised significant foundations of the church in Germany and was made Archbishop of Mainz by Pope Gregory III. He was martyred in Frisia in 754, along with 52 others, and his remains were returned to Fulda, where they rest in a sarcophagus which remains a site of Christian pilgrimage.

Boniface's life and death as well as his work became widely known, there being a wealth of material available – a number of vitae, especially the near-contemporary Vita Bonifatii auctore Willibaldi, legal documents, possibly some sermons, and above all his correspondence. He is venerated as a saint in the Christian church and became the patron saint of Germania, known as the "Apostle to the Germans".

Norman Cantor notes the three roles Boniface played that made him "one of the truly outstanding creators of the first Europe, as the apostle of Germania, the reformer of the Frankish Church, and the chief fomentor of the alliance between the papacy and the Carolingian family." Through his efforts to reorganize and regulate the church of the Franks, he helped shape the Latin Church in Europe, and many of the dioceses he proposed remain today. After his martyrdom, he was quickly hailed as a saint in Fulda and other areas in Germania and in England. He is still venerated strongly today by Catholics in Germany and throughout the German diaspora. Boniface is celebrated as a missionary; he is regarded as a unifier of Europe, and he is regarded by German Roman Catholics as a national figure.

In 2019 Devon County Council, with the support of the Anglican Diocese of Exeter, the Roman Catholic Diocese of Plymouth, and local Devon leaders of the Orthodox, Methodist, and Congregational churches, officially recognised St Boniface as the Patron Saint of Devon.

== Early life ==
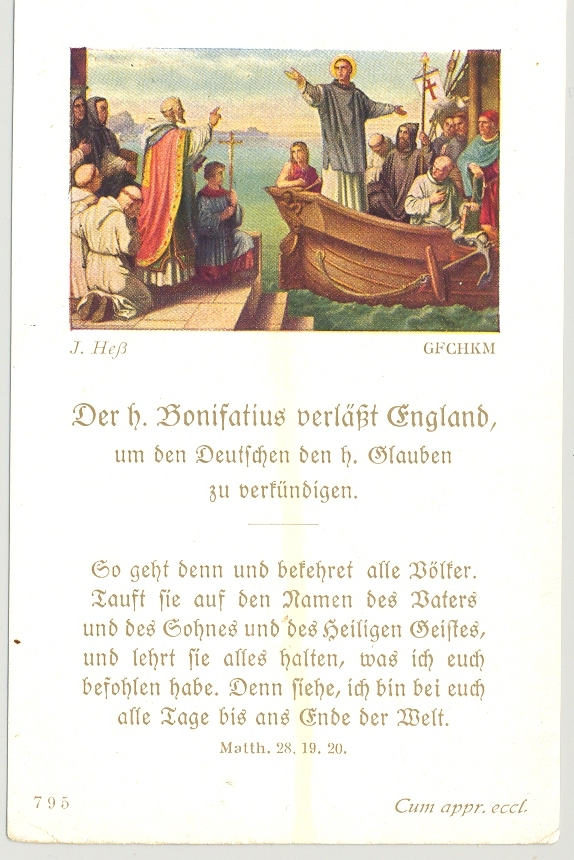
Prayer card, early 20th century, depicting Boniface leaving England

The earliest Bonifacian vita does not indicate his place of birth but says that at an early age he attended a monastery ruled by Abbot Wulfhard in escancastre, or Examchester, which seems to denote Exeter, and may have been one of many monasteriola built by local landowners and churchmen; nothing else is known of it outside the Bonifacian vitae. This monastery is believed to have occupied the site of the Church of St Mary Major in the City of Exeter, demolished in 1971, next to Exeter Cathedral. Later tradition places his birth at Crediton, but the earliest mention of Crediton in connection to Boniface is from the early fourteenth century, in John Grandisson's Legenda Sanctorum: The Proper Lessons for Saints' Days according to the use of Exeter. In one of his letters Boniface mentions he was "born and reared...[in] the synod of London", but he may have been speaking metaphorically. His English name is recorded as being Winfrid or Winfred.

According to the vitae, Winfrid was of a respected and prosperous family. Against his father's wishes he devoted himself at an early age to the monastic life. He received further theological training in the Benedictine monastery and minster of Nhutscelle (Nursling), not far from Winchester, which under the direction of abbot Winbert had grown into an industrious centre of learning in the tradition of Aldhelm. Winfrid taught in the abbey school and at the age of 30 became a priest; in this time, he wrote a Latin grammar, the Ars Grammatica, besides a treatise on verse and some Aldhelm-inspired riddles. While little is known about Nursling outside Boniface's vitae, it seems clear that the library there was significant. To supply Boniface with the materials he needed, it would have contained works by Donatus, Priscian, Isidore, and many others. Around 716, when his abbot Wynberth of Nursling died, he was invited (or expected) to assume his position—it is possible that they were related, and the practice of hereditary right among the early Anglo-Saxons would affirm this. Winfrid, however, declined the position and in 716 set out on a missionary expedition to Frisia.

== Early missionary work in Frisia and Germania ==
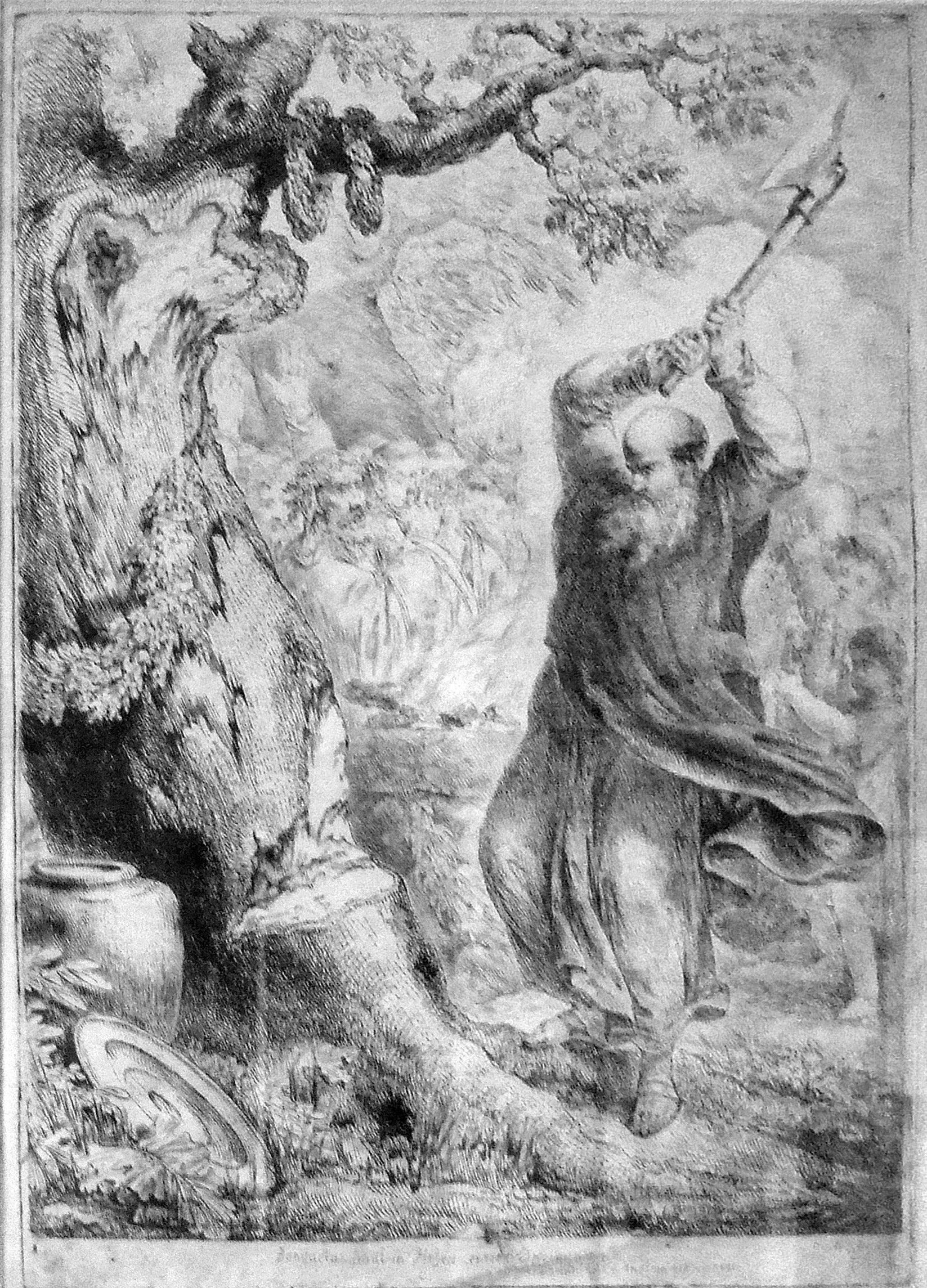
Saint Boniface felling Donar's Oak

Boniface first left for the continent in 716. He traveled to Utrecht, where Willibrord, the "Apostle to the Frisians", had been working since the 690s. He spent a year with Willibrord, preaching in the countryside, but their efforts were frustrated by the war then being carried on between Charles Martel and Radbod, King of the Frisians. Willibrord fled to the abbey he had founded in Echternach (in modern-day Luxembourg) while Boniface returned to Nursling.

Boniface returned to the continent the next year and went straight to Rome, where Pope Gregory II renamed him "Boniface", after the (legendary) fourth-century martyr Boniface of Tarsus, and appointed him missionary bishop for Germania—he became a bishop without a diocese for an area that lacked any church organization. He would never return to England, though he remained in correspondence with his countrymen and kinfolk throughout his life.

Saint Boniface of Mainz by Albrecht De Vriendt

According to the vitae Boniface felled the Donar Oak, Latinized by Willibald as "Jupiter's oak", near the present-day town of Fritzlar in northern Hesse. According to his early biographer Willibald, Boniface started to chop the oak down, when suddenly a great wind, by miracle, blew the ancient oak over. When the gods did not strike him down, the people were amazed and converted to Christianity. He built a church from its wood at the site—the church was the beginning of the monastery in Fritzlar. This account from the vita is stylised to portray Boniface as a singular character who alone acts to root out paganism. Lutz von Padberg and others claim that what the vitae leave out is that the action was most likely well-prepared and widely publicized in advance for maximum effect, and that Boniface had little reason to fear for his personal safety since the Frankish fortified settlement of Büraburg was nearby. According to Willibald, Boniface later had a church with an attached monastery built in Fritzlar, on the site of the previously built chapel, according to tradition.

== Boniface and the Carolingians ==
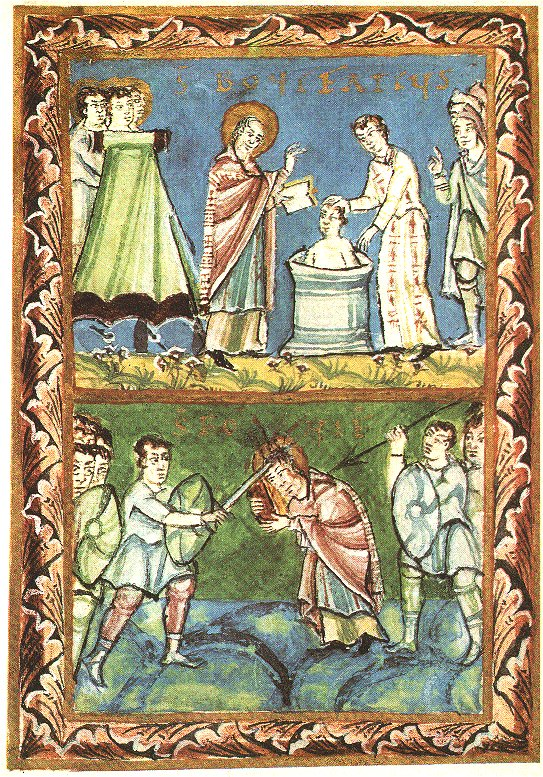
Fulda Sacramentary, Saint Boniface baptising (top) and being martyred (bottom)

The support of the Frankish mayors of the palace, and later the early Pippinids and the Carolingian dynasty, was essential for Boniface's work. Boniface had been under the protection of Charles Martel from 723 onwards. The Christian Frankish leaders desired to defeat their rival power, the pagan Saxons, and to incorporate the Saxon lands into their own growing empire. Boniface's campaign of destruction of indigenous Germanic pagan sites may have benefited the Franks in their campaign against the Saxons.

In 732, Boniface traveled again to Rome to report, and Pope Gregory III conferred upon him the pallium as archbishop with jurisdiction over what is now Germany. Boniface again set out for the German lands and continued his mission, but also used his authority to work on the relations between the papacy and the Frankish church. Rome wanted more control over that church, which it felt was much too independent and which, in the eyes of Boniface, was subject to worldly corruption. Charles Martel, after having defeated the forces of the Umayyad Caliphate during the Battle of Tours (732), had rewarded many churches and monasteries with lands, but typically his supporters who held church offices were allowed to benefit from those possessions. Boniface would have to wait until the 740s before he could try to address this situation, in which Frankish church officials were essentially sinecures, and the church itself paid little heed to Rome. During his third visit to Rome in 737–38, he was made papal legate for Germany.

After Boniface's third trip to Rome, Charles Martel established four dioceses in Bavaria (Salzburg, Regensburg, Freising, and Passau) and gave them to Boniface as archbishop and metropolitan over all Germany east of the Rhine. In 745, he was granted Mainz as metropolitan see. In 742, one of his disciples, Sturm (also known as Sturmi, or Sturmius), founded the abbey of Fulda not far from Boniface's earlier missionary outpost at Fritzlar. Although Sturm was the founding abbot of Fulda, Boniface was very involved in the foundation. The initial grant for the abbey was signed by Carloman, the son of Charles Martel, and a supporter of Boniface's reform efforts in the Frankish church. Boniface himself explained to his old friend, Daniel of Winchester, that without the protection of Charles Martel he could "neither administer his church, defend his clergy, nor prevent idolatry".

According to German historian Gunther Wolf, the high point of Boniface's career was the Concilium Germanicum, organized by Carloman in an unknown location in April 743. Although Boniface was not able to safeguard the church from property seizures by the local nobility, he did achieve one goal, the adoption of stricter guidelines for the Frankish clergy, who often hailed directly from the nobility. After Carloman's resignation in 747 he maintained a sometimes turbulent relationship with the king of the Franks, Pepin the Short; the claim that he would have crowned Pepin at Soissons in 751 is now generally discredited.

Boniface balanced this support and attempted to maintain some independence, however, by attaining the support of the papacy and of the Agilolfings of Bavaria. In Frankish, Hessian, and Thuringian territory, he established the diocese of Würzburg (741). By appointing his own followers as bishops, he was able to retain some independence from the Carolingians, who most likely were content to give him leeway as long as Christianity was imposed on the Saxons and other Germanic tribes.

== Last mission to Frisia ==
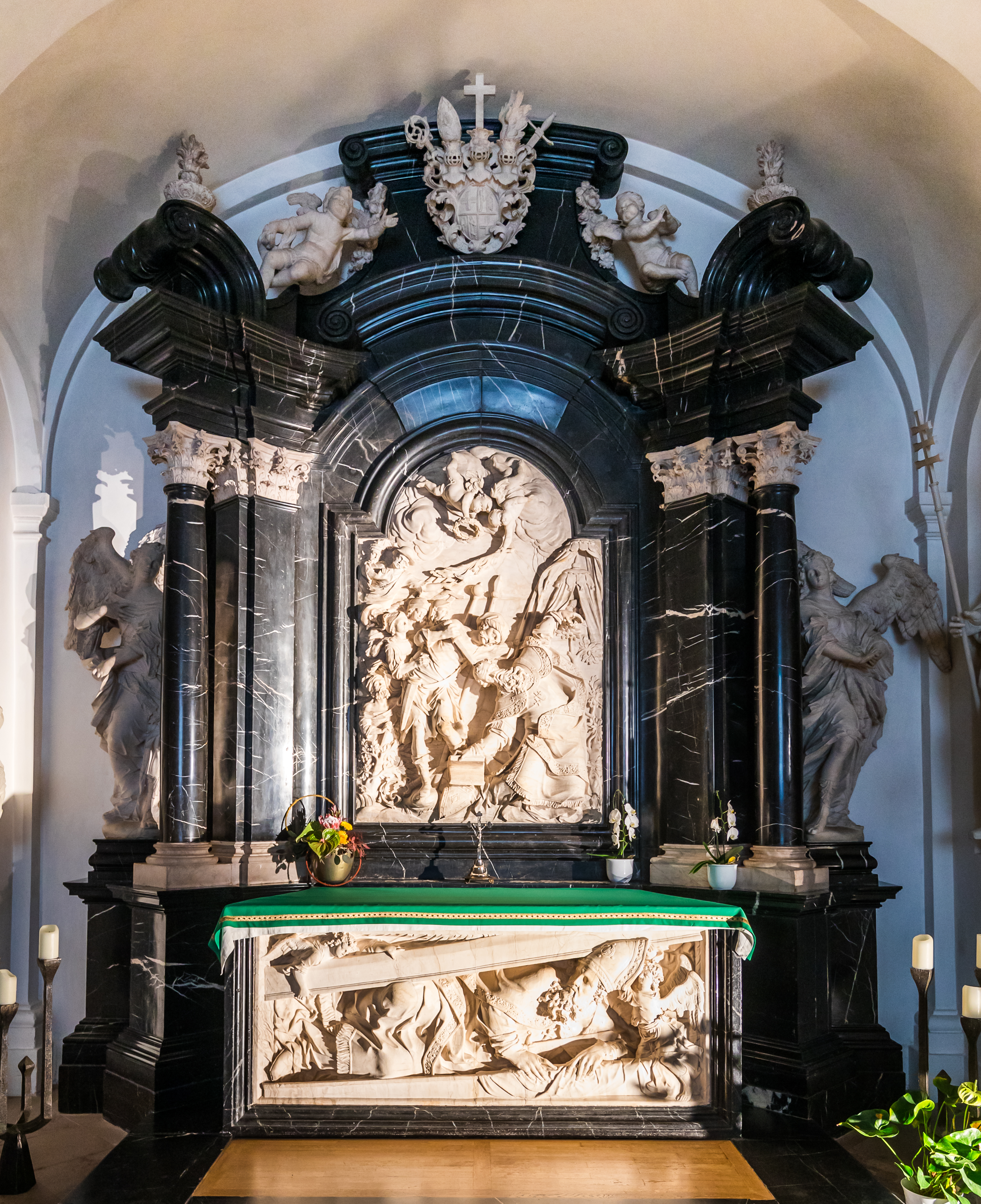
Saint Boniface crypt, Fulda

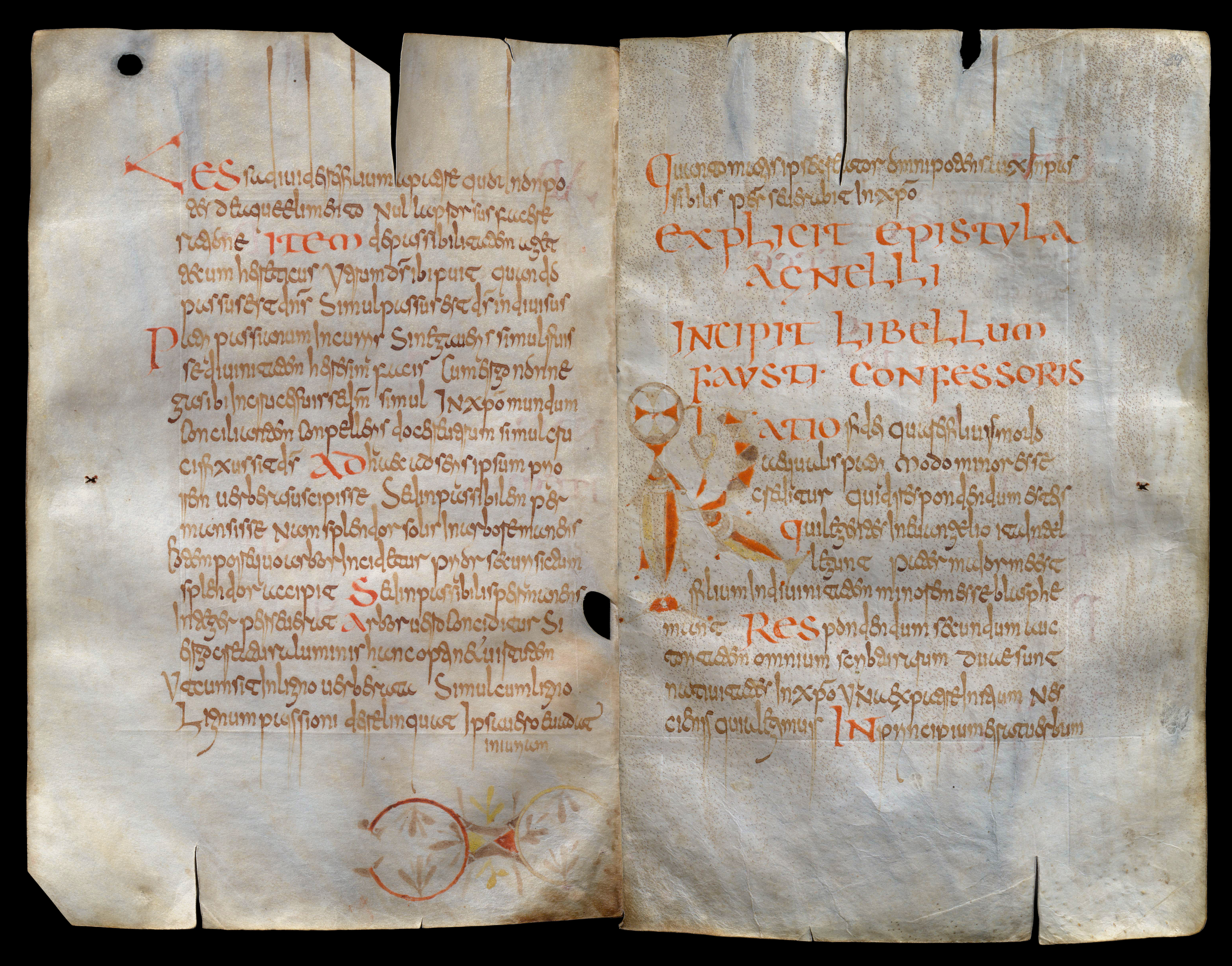
Excerpt from the Ragyndrudis Codex. It bears parallel nail holes on the margins of each page.

According to the vitae, Boniface had never relinquished his hope of converting the Frisians, and in 754 he set out with a retinue for Frisia. He baptized a great number and summoned a general meeting for confirmation at a place not far from Dokkum, between Franeker and Groningen. However, instead of his converts, a group of armed robbers appeared and slew the aged archbishop. The vitae mention that Boniface persuaded his (armed) comrades to lay down their arms: "Cease fighting. Lay down your arms, for we are told in Scripture not to render evil for evil but to overcome evil by good."

Having killed Boniface and his company, the Frisian bandits ransacked their possessions but found that the company's luggage did not contain the riches they had hoped for: "they broke open the chests containing the books and found, to their dismay, that they held manuscripts instead of gold vessels, pages of sacred texts instead of silver plates." They attempted to destroy these books, the earliest vita already says, and this account underlies the status of the Ragyndrudis Codex, now held as a Bonifacian relic in Fulda, and supposedly one of three books found on the field by the Christians who inspected it afterward. Of those three books, the Ragyndrudis Codex shows incisions that could have been made by sword or axe; its story appears confirmed in the Utrecht hagiography, the Vita altera, which reports that an eye-witness saw that the saint at the moment of death held up a gospel as spiritual protection. The story was later repeated by Otloh's vita; at that time, the Ragyndrudis Codex seems to have been firmly connected to the martyrdom.

Boniface's remains were moved from the Frisian countryside to Utrecht, and then to Mainz, where sources contradict each other regarding the behavior of Lullus, Boniface's successor as archbishop of Mainz. According to Willibald's vita Lullus allowed the body to be moved to Fulda, while in the (later) Vita Sturmi, a hagiography of Sturm by Eigil of Fulda, Lullus attempted to block the move and keep the body in Mainz.

His remains were eventually buried in the abbey church of Fulda after resting for some time in Utrecht, and they are entombed within a shrine beneath the high altar of Fulda Cathedral, previously the abbey church. There is good reason to believe that the Gospel he held up was the Codex Sangallensis 56, which shows damage to the upper margin, which has been cut back as a form of repair.

== Veneration ==
=== Fulda ===
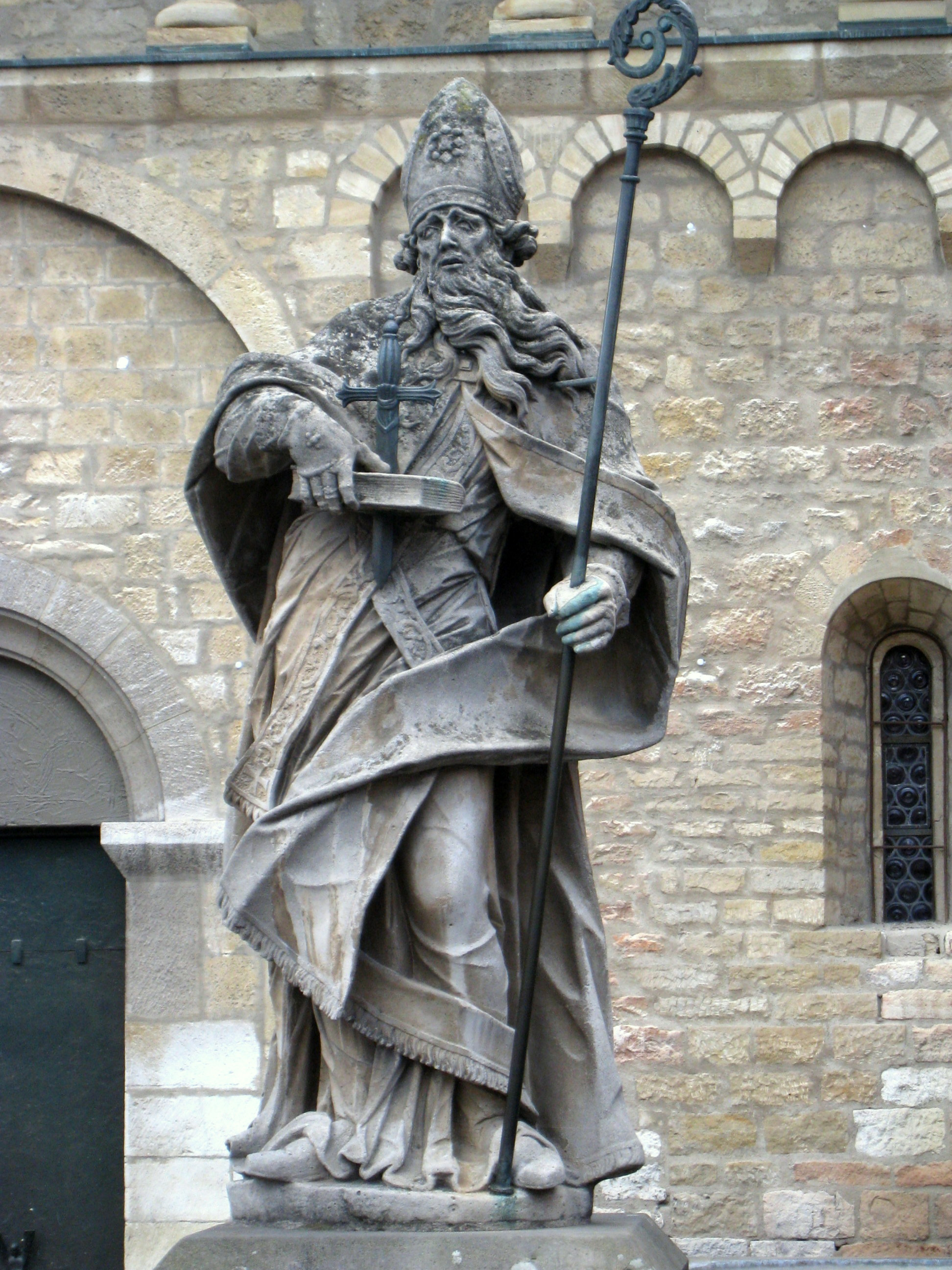
Statue of St. Boniface by Johann Kaspar Hiernle (1750) at Mainz Cathedral

Veneration of Boniface in Fulda began immediately after his death; his grave was equipped with a decorative tomb around ten years after his burial, and the grave and relics became the center of the abbey. Fulda monks prayed for newly elected abbots at the grave site before greeting them, and every Monday the saint was remembered in prayer, the monks prostrating themselves and reciting Psalm 50. After the abbey church was rebuilt to become the Ratgar Basilica (dedicated 791), Boniface's remains were translated to a new grave: since the church had been enlarged, his grave, originally in the west, was now in the middle; his relics were moved to a new apse in 819. From then on Boniface, as patron of the abbey, was regarded as both spiritual intercessor for the monks and legal owner of the abbey and its possessions, and all donations to the abbey were done in his name. He was honored on the date of his martyrdom, 5 June (with a mass written by Alcuin), and (around the year 1000) with a mass dedicated to his appointment as bishop, on 1 December.

=== Dokkum ===
Willibald's vita describes how a visitor on horseback came to the site of the martyrdom, and a hoof of his horse got stuck in the mire. When it was pulled loose, a well sprang up. By the time of the Vita altera Bonifatii (9th century), there was a church on the site, and the well had become a "fountain of sweet water" used to sanctify people. The Vita Liudgeri, a hagiographical account of the work of Ludger, describes how Ludger himself had built the church, sharing duties with two other priests. According to James Palmer, the well was of great importance since the saint's body was hundreds of miles away; the physicality of the well allowed for an ongoing connection with the saint. In addition, Boniface signified Dokkum's and Frisia's "connect[ion] to the rest of (Frankish) Christendom".

== Memorials ==
Saint Boniface's feast day is celebrated on 5 June in the Roman Catholic Church, the Lutheran Church, the Anglican Communion and the Eastern Orthodox Church.

A famous statue of Saint Boniface stands on the grounds of Mainz Cathedral, seat of the archbishop of Mainz. A more modern rendition stands facing St. Peter's Church of Fritzlar.

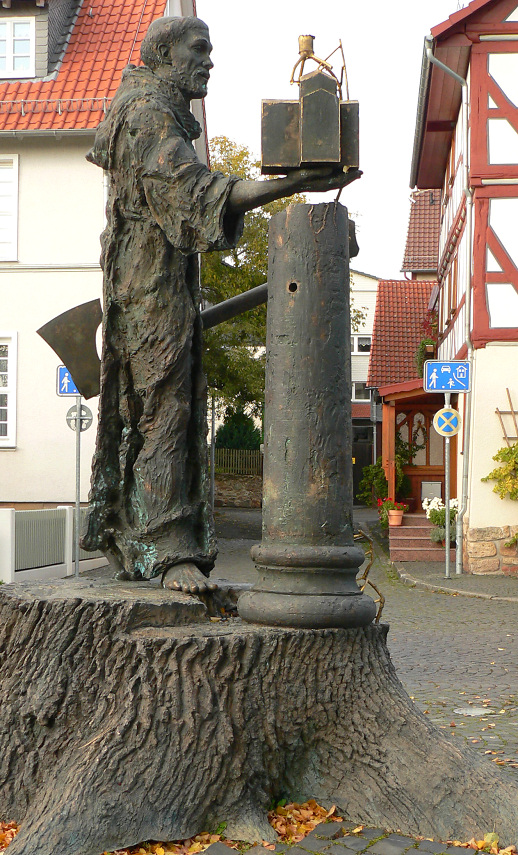
Saint Boniface memorial in Fritzlar, Germany

The UK National Shrine is located at the Catholic church at Crediton, Devon, which has a bas-relief of the felling of Thor's Oak, by sculptor Kenneth Carter. The sculpture was unveiled by Princess Margaret in his native Crediton, located in Newcombes Meadow Park. There is also a series of paintings there by Timothy Moore. There are quite a few churches dedicated to St. Boniface in the United Kingdom: Bunbury, Cheshire; Chandler's Ford and Southampton Hampshire; Adler Street, London; Papa Westray, Orkney; St Budeaux, Plymouth (now demolished); Bonchurch, Isle of Wight; Cullompton, Devon.

St Boniface Down, the highest point in the Isle of Wight, is named after him.

Bishop George Errington founded St Boniface's Catholic College, Plymouth in 1856. The school celebrates Saint Boniface on 5 June each year.

In 1818, Father Norbert Provencher founded a mission on the east bank of the Red River in what was then Rupert's Land, building a log church and naming it after St. Boniface. The log church was consecrated as Saint Boniface Cathedral after Provencher was himself consecrated as a bishop and the diocese was formed. The community that grew around the cathedral eventually became the city of Saint Boniface, which merged into the city of Winnipeg in 1971. In 1844, four Grey Nuns arrived by canoe in Manitoba, and in 1871, built Western Canada's first hospital: St. Boniface Hospital, where the Assiniboine and Red Rivers meet. Today, St. Boniface is regarded as Winnipeg's main French-speaking district and the centre of the Franco-Manitobain community, and St. Boniface Hospital is the second-largest hospital in Manitoba.

Boniface (Wynfrith) of Crediton is remembered in the Church of England with a Lesser Festival on 5 June.

== Legends ==
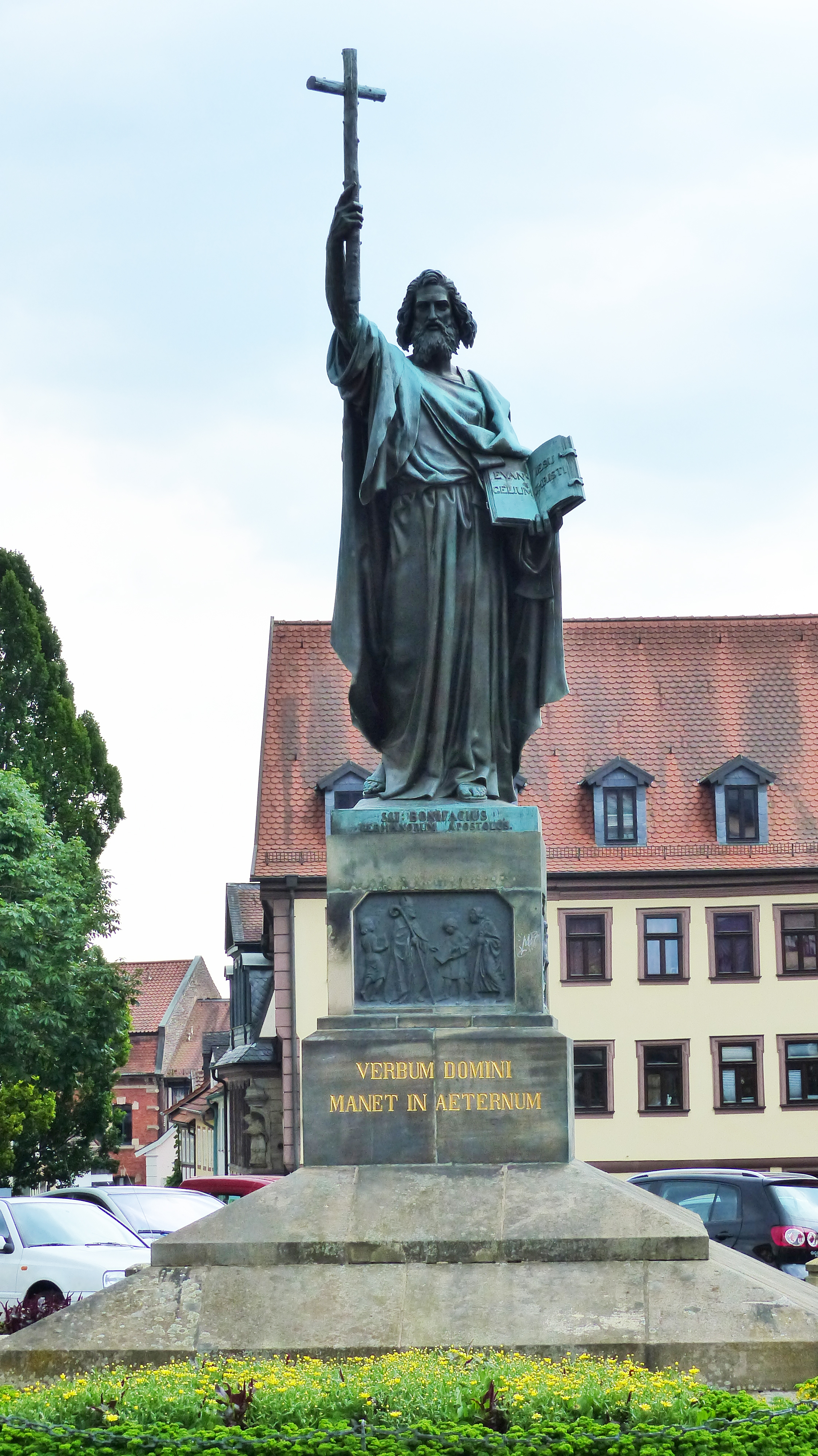
Saint Boniface statue in Fulda, Germany

Some traditions credit Saint Boniface with the invention of the Christmas tree. It is mentioned on a BBC-Devon website, in an account which places Geismar in Bavaria, and in a number of educational books, including St. Boniface and the Little Fir Tree, The Brightest Star of All: Christmas Stories for the Family, The American normal readers, and a short story by Henry van Dyke, "The First Christmas Tree".

== Sources and writings ==
=== Vitae ===
The earliest "Life" of Boniface was written by a certain Willibald, an Anglo-Saxon priest who came to Mainz after Boniface's death, around 765. Willibald's biography was widely dispersed; Levison lists some forty manuscripts. According to his lemma, a group of four manuscripts including Codex Monacensis 1086 are copies directly from the original.

Listed second in Levison's edition is the entry from a late ninth-century Fulda document: Boniface's status as a martyr is attested by his inclusion in the Fulda Martyrology which also lists, for instance, the date (1 November) of his translation in 819, when the Fulda Cathedral had been rebuilt. A Vita Bonifacii was written in Fulda in the ninth century, possibly by Candidus of Fulda, but is now lost.

The next vita, chronologically, is the Vita altera Bonifatii auctore Radbodo, which originates in the Bishopric of Utrecht, and was probably revised by Radboud of Utrecht (899–917). Mainly agreeing with Willibald, it adds an eye-witness who presumably saw the martyrdom at Dokkum. The Vita tertia Bonifatii likewise originates in Utrecht. It is dated between 917 (Radboud's death) and 1075, the year Adam of Bremen wrote his Gesta Hammaburgensis ecclesiae pontificum, which used the Vita tertia.

A later vita, written by Otloh of St. Emmeram (1062–1066), is based on Willibald's and a number of other vitae as well as the correspondence, and also includes information from local traditions.

=== Correspondence ===
Boniface engaged in regular correspondence with fellow churchmen all over Western Europe, including the three popes he worked with, and with some of his kinsmen back in England. Many of these letters contain questions about church reform and liturgical or doctrinal matters. In most cases, what remains is one half of the conversation, either the question or the answer. The correspondence as a whole gives evidence of Boniface's widespread connections; some of the letters also prove an intimate relationship especially with female correspondents.

There are 150 letters in what is generally called the Bonifatian correspondence, though not all them are by Boniface or addressed to him. They were assembled by order of archbishop Lullus, Boniface's successor in Mainz, and were initially organized into two parts, a section containing the papal correspondence and another with his private letters. They were reorganized in the eighth century, in a roughly chronological ordering. Otloh of St. Emmeram, who worked on a new vita of Boniface in the eleventh century, is credited with compiling the complete correspondence as we have it. Much of this correspondence comprises the first part of the Vienna Boniface Codex, also known as Codex Vindobonensis 751.

The correspondence was edited and published already in the seventeenth century, by Nicolaus Serarius. Stephan Alexander Würdtwein's 1789 edition, Epistolae S. Bonifacii Archiepiscopi Magontini, was the basis for a number of (partial) translations in the nineteenth century. The first version to be published by Monumenta Germaniae Historica (MGH) was the edition by Ernst Dümmler (1892); the most authoritative version until today is Michael Tangl's 1912 Die Briefe des Heiligen Bonifatius, Nach der Ausgabe in den Monumenta Germaniae Historica, published by MGH in 1916. This edition is the basis of Ephraim Emerton's selection and translation in English, The Letters of Saint Boniface, first published in New York in 1940; it was republished most recently with a new introduction by Thomas F.X. Noble in 2000.

Included among his letters and dated to 716 is one to Abbess Edburga of Minster-in-Thanet containing the Vision of the Monk of Wenlock. This otherworld vision describes how a violently ill monk is freed from his body and guided by angels to a place of judgment, where angels and devils fight over his soul as his sins and virtues come alive to accuse and defend him. He sees a hell of purgation full of pits vomiting flames. There is a bridge over a pitch-black boiling river. Souls either fall from it or safely reach the other side cleansed of their sins. This monk even sees some of his contemporary monks and is told to warn them to repent before they die. This vision bears signs of influence by the Apocalypse of Paul, the visions from the Dialogues of Gregory the Great, and the visions recorded by Bede.

=== Sermons ===
Some fifteen preserved sermons are traditionally associated with Boniface, but that they were actually his is not generally accepted.

=== Grammar and poetry ===
Early in his career, before he left for the continent, Boniface wrote the Ars Bonifacii, a grammatical treatise presumably for his students in Nursling. Helmut Gneuss reports that one manuscript copy of the treatise originates from (the south of) England, mid-eighth century; it is now held in Marburg, in the Hessisches Staatsarchiv. He also wrote a treatise on verse, the Caesurae uersuum, and a collection of twenty acrostic riddles, the Enigmata, influenced greatly by Aldhelm and containing many references to works of Vergil (the Aeneid, the Georgics, and the Eclogues). The riddles fall into two sequences of ten poems. The first, De virtutibus ('on the virtues'), comprises: 1. de ueritate/truth; 2. de fide catholica/the Catholic faith; 3. de spe/hope; 4. de misericordia/compassion; 5. de caritate/love; 6. de iustitia/justice; 7. de patientia/patience; 8. de pace uera, cristiana/true, Christian peace; 9. de humilitate cristiania/Christian humility; 10. de uirginitate/virginity. The second sequence, De vitiis ('on the vices'), comprises: 1. de neglegentia/carelessness; 2. de iracundia/hot temper; 3. de cupiditate/greed; 4. de superbia/pride; 5. de crapula/intemperance; 6. de ebrietate/drunkenness; 7. de luxoria/fornication; 8. de inuidia/envy; 9. de ignorantia/ignorance; 10. de uana gloria/vainglory.

Three octosyllabic poems written in clearly Aldhelmian fashion (according to Andy Orchard) are preserved in his correspondence, all composed before he left for the continent.

=== Additional materials ===
A letter by Boniface charging Aldebert and Clement with heresy is preserved in the records of the Roman Council of 745 that condemned the two. Boniface had an interest in the Irish canon law collection known as Collectio canonum Hibernensis, and a late eighth/early ninth-century manuscript in Würzburg contains, besides a selection from the Hibernensis, a list of rubrics that mention the heresies of Clemens and Aldebert. The relevant folios containing these rubrics were most likely copied in Mainz, Würzburg, or Fulda—all places associated with Boniface. Michael Glatthaar suggested that the rubrics should be seen as Boniface's contribution to the agenda for a synod.

== Anniversary and other celebrations ==
Boniface's death (and birth) has given rise to a number of noteworthy celebrations. The dates for some of these celebrations have undergone some changes: in 1805, 1855, and 1905 (and in England in 1955) anniversaries were calculated with Boniface's death dated in 755, according to the "Mainz tradition"; in Mainz, Michael Tangl's dating of the martyrdom in 754 was not accepted until after 1955. Celebrations in Germany centered on Fulda and Mainz, in the Netherlands on Dokkum and Utrecht, and in England on Crediton and Exeter.

=== Celebrations in Germany: 1805, 1855, 1905 ===
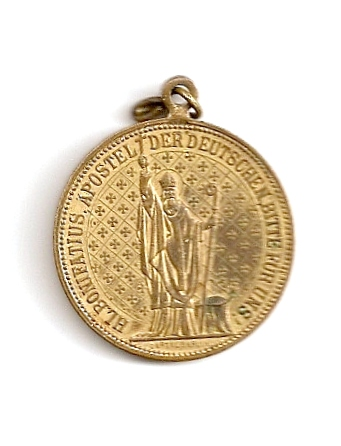
Medal minted for the Boniface anniversary in Fulda, 1905

The first German celebration on a fairly large scale was held in 1805 (the 1,050th anniversary of his death), followed by a similar celebration in a number of towns in 1855; both of these were predominantly Catholic affairs emphasizing the role of Boniface in German history. But if the celebrations were mostly Catholic, in the first part of the 19th century the respect for Boniface in general was an ecumenical affair, with both Protestants and Catholics praising Boniface as a founder of the German nation, in response to the German nationalism that arose after the Napoleonic era came to an end. The second part of the 19th century saw increased tension between Catholics and Protestants; for the latter, Martin Luther had become the model German, the founder of the modern nation, and he and Boniface were in direct competition for the honor. In 1905, when strife between Catholic and Protestant factions had eased (one Protestant church published a celebratory pamphlet, Gerhard Ficker's Bonifatius, der "Apostel der Deutschen"), there were modest celebrations and a publication for the occasion on historical aspects of Boniface and his work, the 1905 Festgabe by Gregor Richter and Carl Scherer. In all, the content of these early celebrations showed evidence of the continuing question about the meaning of Boniface for Germany, though the importance of Boniface in cities associated with him was without question.

=== 1954 celebrations ===
In 1954, celebrations were widespread in England, Germany, and the Netherlands, and a number of these celebrations were international affairs. Especially in Germany, these celebrations had a distinctly political note to them and often stressed Boniface as a kind of founder of Europe, such as when Konrad Adenauer, the (Catholic) German chancellor, addressed a crowd of 60,000 in Fulda, celebrating the feast day of the saint in a European context: Das, was wir in Europa gemeinsam haben, [ist] gemeinsamen Ursprungs ("What we have in common in Europe comes from the same source").

=== 1980 papal visit ===
When Pope John Paul II visited Germany in November 1980, he spent two days in Fulda (17 and 18 November). He celebrated Mass in Fulda Cathedral with 30,000 gathered on the square in front of the building, and met with the German Bishops' Conference (held in Fulda since 1867). The pope next celebrated mass outside the cathedral, in front of an estimated crowd of 100,000, and hailed the importance of Boniface for German Christianity: Der heilige Bonifatius, Bischof und Märtyrer, 'bedeutet' den 'Anfang' des Evangeliums und der Kirche in Eurem Land ("The holy Boniface, bishop and martyr, 'signifies' the beginning of the gospel and the church in your country"). A photograph of the pope praying at Boniface's grave became the centerpiece of a prayer card distributed from the cathedral.

=== 2004 celebrations ===
In 2004, anniversary celebrations were held throughout Northwestern Germany and Utrecht, and Fulda and Mainz—generating a great amount of academic and popular interest. The event occasioned a number of scholarly studies, esp. biographies (for instance, by Auke Jelsma in Dutch, Lutz von Padberg in German, and Klaas Bruinsma in Frisian), and a fictional completion of the Boniface correspondence (Lutterbach, Mit Axt und Evangelium). A German musical proved a great commercial success, and in the Netherlands an opera was staged.

== Scholarship on Boniface ==
There is an extensive body of literature on the saint and his work. At the time of the various anniversaries, edited collections were published containing essays by some of the best-known scholars of the time, such as the 1954 collection Sankt Bonifatius: Gedenkgabe zum Zwölfhundertsten Todestag and the 2004 collection Bonifatius — Vom Angelsächsischen Missionar zum Apostel der Deutschen. In the modern era, Lutz von Padberg published a number of biographies and articles on the saint focusing on his missionary praxis and his relics. The most authoritative biography remains Theodor Schieffer's Winfrid-Bonifatius und die Christliche Grundlegung Europas (1954).

== See also ==
- List of Catholic saints
- Religion in Germany
- Saint Boniface, patron saint archive
- St Boniface's Catholic College, Plymouth, England
- St. Bonifacius, Minnesota

Catholic Church titles
Preceded by Gewielieb	Archbishop of Mainz; 745–754	Succeeded by Lullus
